= List of Atari ST games =

== Commercial games ==
There are 2399 games on this list.

Name	Alternative name	Year	ST	Falcon030	Publisher
'Nam 1965-1975		1991	✓	✗	Domark
10th Frame		1987	✓	✗	Access Software
12. Jahrhundert (Das)		1990	✓	✗	Softbär
1789 la Révolution Française		1989	✓	✗	16/32 Diffusion
1943: The Battle of Midway		1988	✓	✗	US Gold
1st Division Manager		1992	✓	✗	Code Masters
20,000 Leagues under the Sea		1989	✓	✗	Coktel Vision
221B Baker Street		1987	✓	✗	Datasoft
3-in-1 Football		1987	✓	✗	Lance Haffner Games
3D Break-Thru		1987	✓	✗	Antic Software
3D Galax		1987	✓	✗	Gremlin Graphics
3D Kit Game (The)		1991	✓	✗	Domark
3D Kit II World (A)		1992	✓	✗	Domark
3D Pool		1989	✓	✗	Firebird (UK)
4 Saisons de l'Écrit (Les) - 6e / 3e			✓	✗	Génération 5
4 Saisons de l'Écrit (Les) - CE / CM			✓	✗	Génération 5
5th Gear		1990	✓	✗	Hewson
8 Ball		1986	✓	✗	MichTron
9 Lives		1990	✓	✗	Atari (UK)
A 320 (Loriciel)		1989	✓	✗	Loriciel
A Prehistoric Tale		1991	✓	✗	Thalion
A.M.C.: Astro Marine Corps		1990	✓	✗	Dinamic
A320 Airbus		1992	✓	✗	Thalion
Aaargh!		1989	✓	✗	Arcadia Software
Aazohm Krypht		1996	✗	✓	Logitron
Academy	Space School Simulator - Academy (The)	1987	✓	✗	CRL
Accelerator		1992	✓	✗	Digital Reality
Action Fighter		1989	✓	✗	Firebird (UK)
Action Service	Combat Course	1988	✓	✗	Cobra Soft
Addams Family, The		1992	✓	✗	Ocean Software
Addictaball		1987	✓	✗	Alligata Software
ADI Anglais 3ème		1991	✓	✗	Coktel Vision
ADI Anglais 4ème		1991	✓	✗	Coktel Vision
ADI Anglais 5ème		1991	✓	✗	Coktel Vision
ADI Anglais 6ème		1991	✓	✗	Coktel Vision
ADI English 11/12		1992	✓	✗	Europress Software
ADI English 12/13		1992	✓	✗	Europress Software
ADI English 13/14		1992	✓	✗	Europress Software
ADI Français 3ème			✓	✗	Coktel Vision
ADI Français 4ème		1991	✓	✗	Coktel Vision
ADI Français 5ème		1990	✓	✗	Coktel Vision
ADI Français 6ème		1990	✓	✗	Coktel Vision
ADI Français CE1		1991	✓	✗	Coktel Vision
ADI Français CE2		1991	✓	✗	Coktel Vision
ADI Français CM1			✓	✗	Coktel Vision
ADI Français CM2		1990	✓	✗	Coktel Vision
ADI French 11/12		1992	✓	✗	Europress Software
ADI French 12/13		1992	✓	✗	Europress Software
ADI French 14/15		1992	✓	✗	Europress Software
ADI Maths 3ème	ADI Maths 14/15		✓	✗	Coktel Vision
ADI Maths 4ème	ADI Maths 13/14	1991	✓	✗	Coktel Vision
ADI Maths 5ème	ADI Maths 12/13		✓	✗	Coktel Vision
ADI Maths 6ème	ADI Maths 11/12	1991	✓	✗	Coktel Vision
ADI Maths CE1			✓	✗	Coktel Vision
ADI Maths CE2			✓	✗	Coktel Vision
ADI Maths CM1		1990	✓	✗	Coktel Vision
ADI Maths CM2		1990	✓	✗	Coktel Vision
ADI Passage CE1		1991	✓	✗	Coktel Vision
ADI Passage CE2		1991	✓	✗	Coktel Vision
Adibac Anglais		1991	✓	✗	Coktel Vision
Adibac Environnement			✓	✗	Coktel Vision
Adibac Histoire		1991	✓	✗	Coktel Vision
Adibac Série C/E		1991	✓	✗	Coktel Vision
Adibou - Je Calcule 4-5 Ans		1992	✓	✗	Coktel Vision
Adibou - Je Calcule 6-7 Ans		1992	✓	✗	Coktel Vision
Adibou - Je Lis 4-5 Ans		1992	✓	✗	Coktel Vision
Adibou - Je Lis 6-7 Ans		1992	✓	✗	Coktel Vision
Adidas Championship Tie Break	Tie-Break	1990	✓	✗	Ocean Software
Adrenalynn			✓	✗	Loriciel
Advanced Destroyer Simulator		1991	✓	✗	Loriciel
Advanced Dungeons & Dragons: Heroes of the Lance		1988	✓	✗	US Gold
Advanced Fruit Machine Simulator		1991	✓	✗	Code Masters
Advanced Rugby Simulator		1989	✓	✗	Code Masters
Advanced Ski Simulator		1990	✓	✗	Code Masters
Advantage Tennis		1992	✓	✗	Infogrames
Adventurer			✓	✗	Zenobi Software
Adventures of Maddog Williams in the Dungeons of Duridian (The)		1991	✓	✗	Game Crafters
Adventures of Robin Hood (The)		1991	✓	✗	Millennium
Affaire (L')		1988	✓	✗	Infogrames
African Raiders		1989	✓	✗	System 4
Afrika Korps		1991	✓	✗	Impressions
After Burner		1988	✓	✗	Activision
After the War		1990	✓	✗	Dinamic
AGE - Advanced Galactic Empire		1991	✓	✗	Coktel Vision
Aigle d'Or, le Retour (L')	Golden Eagle	1991	✓	✗	Loriciel
Air Bucks		1992	✓	✗	Impressions
Air c'est la Vie, L'		1993	✓	✗	Myriad
Air Supply		1990	✓	✗	Magic Bytes
Air Support		1993	✓	✗	Psygnosis
Airball		1987	✓	✗	Microdeal
Airborne Ranger		1989	✓	✗	MicroProse
Airstrike USA	ATF II – Advanced Tactical Fighter II	1990	✓	✗	Cinemaware
Albedo		1988	✓	✗	Myriad
Alcantor		1991	✓	✗	Lankhor
Alcatraz		1992	✓	✗	Infogrames
Alcon	Slap Fight	1987	✓	✗	Taito Software
ALF - The First Adventure		1989	✓	✗	Box Office
Aliants - The Desperate Battle for Earth		1987	✓	✗	StarSoft Development Laboratories
Alien Fires 2199 AD		1987	✓	✗	Paragon Software
Alien Storm		1991	✓	✗	US Gold
Alien Syndrome		1988	✓	✗	Edge (The)
Alien Thing	Alien Thing - Expert Edition	1995	✓	✗	Top Byte Software
Alien World		1992	✓	✗	Hi-Tec Premier Software
All Aboard! Micro Gauge Train Set		1988	✓	✗	Antic Software
All Blocked Up		1991	✓	✗	Shoestring Software
Alpha Max One		1989	✓	✗	White Panther
Alpha Waves		1990	✓	✗	Infogrames
Alpine Games		1988	✓	✗	Atlantis Software
Altaïr		1987	✓	✗	Ère Informatique
Altered Beast		1989	✓	✗	Activision
Alternate Reality: The City		1986	✓	✗	Datasoft
Amazing Spider-Man (The)		1990	✓	✗	Empire Software
Amazon		1985	✓	✗	Telarium
Amberstar		1992	✓	✗	Thalion
American Pool	ST Pool		✓	✗	Robtek Ltd.
Anarchy		1990	✓	✗	Psygnosis
Ancient Art of War in the Skies (The)		1993	✓	✗	MicroProse
Ancient Games		1991	✓	✗	Impressions
Andes Attack		1989	✓	✗	Llamasoft
Angel Nieto Pole 500		1990	✓	✗	Opera Soft
Annals of Rome	Annales de Rome, Annalen der Römer	1987	✓	✗	PSS
Another World		1992	✓	✗	Delphine Software
Answer Back Junior Quiz		1989	✓	✗	Kosmos Software
Answer Back Senior Quiz		1989	✓	✗	Kosmos Software
Antago		1990	✓	✗	Art of Dreams
Apache Flight		1992	✓	✗	Atlantis Software
APB - All Points Bulletin		1989	✓	✗	Domark
Apprentice		1990	✓	✗	Rainbow Arts
Aquanaut		1990	✓	✗	Addictive Games
Arachnophobie		1991	✓	✗	Disney Software
Arcade Fruit Machine		1993	✓	✗	Zeppelin Games
Arcade Trivia Quiz		1991	✓	✗	Zeppelin Games
Archer Maclean's Pool	Billard Américain (Le)	1992	✓	✗	Virgin Games
Archipelagos		1989	✓	✗	Logotron
Arcticfox		1987	✓	✗	Electronic Arts
Arena		1986	✓	✗	Psygnosis
Ark-ed		1988	✓	✗	Pressimage
Ark-ed II		1989	✓	✗	Pressimage
Arkanoid		1987	✓	✗	Imagine
Arkanoid: Revenge of Doh		1988	✓	✗	Imagine
Armada		1990	✓	✗	Atari (UK)
Armalyte		1991	✓	✗	Thalamus
Armour-Geddon		1991	✓	✗	Psygnosis
Army Moves		1988	✓	✗	Imagine
Around the World		1992	✓	✗	Floppyshop
Art de la Guerre (L')	Ancient Art of War (The)	1990	✓	✗	Brøderbund Software
Artificial Dreams		1988	✓	✗	Addictive Games
Artura		1988	✓	✗	Gremlin Graphics
Asgard		1987	✓	✗	Ariolasoft
Associe		1989	✓	✗	Carraz
Astaroth: The Angel of Death		1989	✓	✗	Hewson
Astate: La Malédiction des Templiers		1989	✓	✗	New Deal Productions
Asterix and the Magic Carpet	Astérix chez Rahazade, Astérix en la India, Astérix im Morgenland	1987	✓	✗	Coktel Vision
Astérix: Operation Getafix	Astérix et le Coup du Menhir, Astérix und Operation Hinkelstein, Astérix - El Golpe del Menhir	1989	✓	✗	Coktel Vision
Asteroids Deluxe		1988	✓	✗	Atari Corporation
At the Carnival		1990	✓	✗	Miles Computing
Atari Grand Prix		1989	✓	✗	Atari Corporation
Atax		1988	✓	✗	Eclipse
Atomia		1987	✓	✗	Pressimage
Atomic Robo-Kid		1990	✓	✗	Activision
Atomino		1991	✓	✗	Psygnosis
Atomix		1990	✓	✗	Thalion
Au Nom de l'Hermine		1988	✓	✗	Coktel Vision
Aussie Joker Poker		1989	✓	✗	Mindscape
Austerlitz		1990	✓	✗	PSS
Autoduel		1987	✓	✗	Origin Systems
Aux Origines de la Vie			✓	✗	Carraz
AV-8B Harrier Assault		1993	✓	✗	Domark
Aventura Espacial (La)		1990	✓	✗	Aventuras AD
Aventura Original (La)		1989	✓	✗	Aventuras AD
Aventures de Carlos (Les)		1994	✓	✗	Microïds
Awele (Pressimage)			✓	✗	Pressimage
Awesome		1991	✓	✗	Psygnosis
Axel's Magic Hammer		1989	✓	✗	Gremlin Graphics
B-17 Flying Fortress		1993	✓	✗	MicroProse
B.A.T.		1990	✓	✗	Ubi Soft
B.A.T. II – The Koshan Conspiracy		1991	✓	✗	Ubi Soft
Baal		1989	✓	✗	Psygnosis
Baby Jo in "Going Home"		1991	✓	✗	Loriciel
Back to the Future Part II		1990	✓	✗	Image Works
Back to the Future Part III		1991	✓	✗	Image Works
Back to the Golden Age		1990	✓	✗	Ubi Soft
Backgammon		1989	✓	✗	Atari Corporation
Backgammon Royale		1991	✓	✗	Oxford Softworks
Backlash		1987	✓	✗	Novagen Software (UK)
Bad Cat		1988	✓	✗	US Gold
Bad Company		1990	✓	✗	Logotron
Bad Dudes Vs. Dragon Ninja		1989	✓	✗	Imagine
Badlands		1990	✓	✗	Domark
Badlands Pete		1990	✓	✗	Atari (UK)
Balade A Cologne		1989	✓	✗	Coktel Vision
Balade à Séville		1989	✓	✗	Coktel Vision
Balade au Pays de Big Ben	Balada Big Ben	1987	✓	✗	Coktel Vision
Balade Outre-Rhin		1987	✓	✗	Coktel Vision
Balance of Power (1987)		1987	✓	✗	Mindscape
Balance of Power - The 1990 Edition		1989	✓	✗	Mindscape
Ball Game (The)		1991	✓	✗	Electronic Zoo
Ball's Quest		1989	✓	✗	Infomédia
Ballistix		1989	✓	✗	Psygnosis
Ballyhoo		1986	✓	✗	Infocom
Bambino - Formes et Couleurs			✓	✗	Carraz
Bambino Fait un Puzzle		1988	✓	✗	Carraz
Bangkok Knights		1989	✓	✗	System 3 Software
Bank Buster		1988	✓	✗	Methodic Solutions
Bank-It		1987	✓	✗	Aaronfay Marketing
Barbarian (Psygnosis)		1987	✓	✗	Psygnosis
Barbarian II		1991	✓	✗	Psygnosis
Barbarian II: The Dungeon of Drax	Axe of Rage	1988	✓	✗	Palace Software
Barbarian: The Ultimate Warrior	Death Sword, Barbarian - Le Guerrier Absolu	1987	✓	✗	Palace Software
Bard's Tale, The		1988	✓	✗	Electronic Arts
Bargon Attack		1992	✓	✗	Coktel Vision
Barre l'Intrus	Cross Out the Intruder, Descubrir el Intruso, Fuori l'Intruso, Streiche den Eindringling	1989	✓	✗	Carraz
Bases de l'Allemand - 4ème / 3ème (Les)			✓	✗	Génération 5
Bases de l'Allemand, Les - Débutants 6e-5e			✓	✗	Génération 5
Bases de l'Anglais - 4ème/3ème (Les)			✓	✗	Génération 5
Bases de l'Anglais - 6ème/5ème (Les)			✓	✗	Génération 5
Bases de l'Espagnol, Les - Debutants 1e-2e annee			✓	✗	Génération 5
Basket Manager		1989	✓	✗	Simulmondo
Batman: The Caped Crusader		1988	✓	✗	Ocean Software
Batman: The Movie		1989	✓	✗	Ocean Software
Battle Bound		1991	✓	✗	On-Line Entertainment
Battle Chess		1989	✓	✗	Electronic Arts
Battle Command		1990	✓	✗	Ocean Software
Battle of Austerlitz: 1805 (The)		1989	✓	✗	Tevex
Battle of the Atlantic - The Ocean Lifeline 1940-1944		1988	✓	✗	Simulations Canada
Battle Probe		1988	✓	✗	Crysys
Battle Tank - Barbarossa to Stalingrad		1989	✓	✗	Simulations Canada
Battlehawks 1942		1989	✓	✗	Lucasfilm Games
Battlemaster		1990	✓	✗	PSS
Battleship	Battleships	1988	✓	✗	Epyx
BattleTech: The Crescent Hawk's Inception		1989	✓	✗	Infocom
Battlezone		1988	✓	✗	Atari Corporation
Beach Volley		1990	✓	✗	Ocean Software
Beagles About	World of Henry	1992	✓	✗	MicroMagic
Beam		1989	✓	✗	Magic Bytes
Beast Busters		1991	✓	✗	Activision
Beastlord		1993	✓	✗	Grandslam Entertainment
Belle Zohra (La)		1992	✓	✗	Logiciels d'en Face (Les)
Bermuda Project		1988	✓	✗	Mirrorsoft
Betrayal		1991	✓	✗	Rainbird
Better Dead than Alien		1988	✓	✗	Electra
Beverly Hills Cop		1990	✓	✗	Tynesoft
Beyond the Ice Palace		1988	✓	✗	Elite
Beyond Zork		1987	✓	✗	Infocom
Big Business		1991	✓	✗	Magic Bytes
Big Game Fishing		1990	✓	✗	Simulmondo
Big Nose The Caveman		1993	✓	✗	Code Masters
Big Run		1992	✓	✗	Sales Curve (The)
Bill Palmer		1987	✓	✗	Arcan
Billiards Simulator		1989	✓	✗	Ère International
Billiards Simulator II		1991	✓	✗	Infogrames
Billy Bounce		1989	✓	✗	B.Ware
Bimbo's Story (The)		1992	✓	✗	Pressimage
Bio Challenge		1989	✓	✗	Delphine Software
Bionic Commando		1988	✓	✗	US Gold
Bismarck		1989	✓	✗	PSS
Black Cauldron, The		1986	✓	✗	Sierra On-Line
Black Gold	Oil Imperium	1992	✓	✗	Starbyte
Black Hornet		1991	✓	✗	Hi-Tec Software
Black Lamp		1988	✓	✗	Firebird (UK)
Black Orchid		1989	✓	✗	Mundane Software
Black Sect		1993	✓	✗	Lankhor
Black Tiger		1990	✓	✗	US Gold
Blackjack Plus III			✓	✗	Musicode
Blastaball	Hyperbowl	1988	✓	✗	Arcadia Software
Blasteroids		1989	✓	✗	Image Works
Blazing Thunder		1991	✓	✗	Hi-Tec Software
Blinky's Scary School		1990	✓	✗	Zeppelin Games
Blitzkrieg - May 1940		1990	✓	✗	Impressions
Blockbuster	Impact	1988	✓	✗	Mindscape
Blockout		1990	✓	✗	California Dreams
Blood Money		1989	✓	✗	Psygnosis
Bloodwych		1989	✓	✗	Image Works
Blue Angel 69		1989	✓	✗	Magic Bytes
Blue Angels - Formation Flight Simulation		1990	✓	✗	Accolade
Blue Max - Aces of the Great War		1990	✓	✗	Three Sixty Pacific
Blue War	Blue War III	1987	✓	✗	US Gold
Blueberry		1987	✓	✗	Coktel Vision
Blues Brothers, The		1991	✓	✗	Titus
Blues du Mycophage, Le		1987	✓	✗	Pressimage
BMX Simulator		1988	✓	✗	Code Masters
Bob Winner		1987	✓	✗	Loriciel
Bolo		1987	✓	✗	Application Systems Heidelberg
Bomb Fusion		1989	✓	✗	Mastertronic
Bomb Jack		1988	✓	✗	Elite
Bomb'X		1993	✓	✗	Mediagogo
Bomber Command		1987	✓	✗	Mars
Bombuzal		1988	✓	✗	Image Works
Bonanza Bros.		1992	✓	✗	US Gold
Booly		1991	✓	✗	Loriciel
Bootiful Babe		1989	✓	✗	White Panther
Border Warfare		1990	✓	✗	Zenobi Software
Border Zone		1987	✓	✗	Infocom
Borodino		1989	✓	✗	Atari Corporation
Borrowed Time		1986	✓	✗	Activision
Bosse des Maths - 1ère (La)		1989	✓	✗	Coktel Vision
Bosse des Maths - 2nde (La)		1991	✓	✗	Coktel Vision
Bosse des Maths - 3ème (La)	Jo el Dromedario - 11-12 Años	1987	✓	✗	Coktel Vision
Bosse des Maths - 4ème (La)		1987	✓	✗	Coktel Vision
Bosse des Maths - 5ème (La)		1987	✓	✗	Coktel Vision
Bosse des Maths - 6ème (La)		1987	✓	✗	Coktel Vision
Boston Bomb Club		1991	✓	✗	Silmarils
Botics		1990	✓	✗	Krisalis
Boulder Dash Construction Kit		1987	✓	✗	Wicked
Bounce Out		1989	✓	✗	Go-dax
Brain Blasters	The Teller	1990	✓	✗	Ubi Soft
Brainbox		1988	✓	✗	CRL
Brat		1991	✓	✗	Image Works
Brataccas		1985	✓	✗	Psygnosis
Breach		1989	✓	✗	Artronic Products Limited
Breach II – Campaign Disk 1		1990	✓	✗	Impressions
Breakers		1986	✓	✗	Brøderbund Software
Breakout		1992	✓	✗	Atari Corporation
Brenarvarious		1995	✓	✗	Top Byte Software
Brian Clough's Football Fortunes	Brian Clough's Fussball Manager	1987	✓	✗	CDS Software
Brick Busta			✓	✗	Impressions
Bride of the Robot		1989	✓	✗	Free Spirit Software, Inc.
Brides of Dracula		1991	✓	✗	Gonzo Games
Bridge 2000			✓	✗	Oxford Softworks
Bridge 5.0		1988	✓	✗	Artworx
Bridge Master	Bridge	1989	✓	✗	Atari Corporation
Bridge Player 2000		1987	✓	✗	Oxford Softworks
Bridge Player 2150 Galactica		1989	✓	✗	Oxford Softworks
Bridge Tutor		1990	✓	✗	Atari Corporation
Brilliant Boffin Brothers (The)		1991	✓	✗	MicroMagic
Brimstone - The Dream of Gawain		1986	✓	✗	Brøderbund Software
Bubble Bobble		1987	✓	✗	Firebird (UK)
Bubble Dizzy		1992	✓	✗	Code Masters
Bubble Ghost		1987	✓	✗	Ère Informatique
Bubble Trouble		1987	✓	✗	Poffel Products
Bubble+		1990	✓	✗	Infogrames
Buffalo Bill's Rodeo Games		1989	✓	✗	Tynesoft
Bug		1993	✓	✗	Pressimage
Bug Bash		1991	✓	✗	Big Shot Software
Buggy Boy	Speed Buggy	1988	✓	✗	Elite
Builderland - The Story of Melba		1991	✓	✗	Loriciel
Bully's Sporting Darts		1993	✓	✗	Alternative Software
Bumpy's Arcade Fantasy		1992	✓	✗	Loriciel
Bundesliga Manager		1990	✓	✗	Software 2000
Bundesliga Manager Professional		1992	✓	✗	Software 2000
Bunny Bricks		1992	✓	✗	Silmarils
Bureaucracy		1987	✓	✗	Infocom
Burger Man		1991	✓	✗	Byte Back
Butcher Hill		1989	✓	✗	Gremlin Graphics
Buzzword		1986	✓	✗	Buzzword Game Company (The)
Cabal		1990	✓	✗	Ocean Software
Cadaver		1990	✓	✗	Image Works
Caesar		1992	✓	✗	Impressions
California Games		1989	✓	✗	Epyx
California Games II		1992	✓	✗	Epyx
Campaign		1993	✓	✗	Empire Software
Cannon Fodder		1994	✓	✗	Virgin Games
Cap'n'Carnage		1991	✓	✗	Impressions
Captain America in The Doom Tube of Dr Megalomann		1988	✓	✗	US Gold
Captain Blood	Arche du Captain Blood (L'), Arche des Captain Blood (Die), Arca di Capitan Blood (L')	1988	✓	✗	Exxos
Captain Dynamo		1992	✓	✗	Code Masters
Captain Fizz Meets the Blaster-Trons		1989	✓	✗	Psygnosis
Captain Planet and the Planeteers		1991	✓	✗	Mindscape
Captive		1990	✓	✗	Mindscape
Car-Vup		1990	✓	✗	Core Design
Cardiac Arrest!		1986	✓	✗	Mad Scientist Software
Cards		1986	✓	✗	MichTron
Carl Lewis Challenge (The)		1992	✓	✗	Psygnosis
Carrier Command		1988	✓	✗	Rainbird
Cartoon Capers		1990	✓	✗	Mandarin Software
Cascade Disk 15		1988	✓	✗	Cascade Games Ltd.
Casino Roulette		1987	✓	✗	CDS Software
Casque des Forgerons (Le)		1987	✓	✗	Coconuts
Casse-Méninges		1991	✓	✗	Éditions Vidéomatique
Castle Master		1990	✓	✗	Domark
Castle Master 2		1990	✓	✗	Domark
Castle Warrior		1989	✓	✗	Delphine Software
Castles		1992	✓	✗	Interplay
Castors Juniors dans la Forêt (Les)	Pequeños Castores en el Bosque (Los)	1990	✓	✗	Coktel Vision
Catch 23		1988	✓	✗	Martech
Cave Maze		1991	✓	✗	Coombe Valley Software
CaveMania		1992	✓	✗	Atlantis Software
Centerfold Squares		1988	✓	✗	Artworx
Challenge (The)		1991	✓	✗	Zenobi Software
Challenge - Simulation Economique		1988	✓	✗	Coktel Vision
Challenge Foot Junior			✓	✗	Génération 5
Challenge Foot Senior		1992	✓	✗	Génération 5
Challenge Golf		1991	✓	✗	On-Line Entertainment
Chambers of Shaolin		1989	✓	✗	Grandslam Entertainment
Champion of the Raj		1990	✓	✗	PSS
Championship Baseball	World Series Baseball	1987	✓	✗	Gamestar
Championship Cricket		1988	✓	✗	Crysys
Championship Manager		1992	✓	✗	Domark
Championship Manager 93		1993	✓	✗	Domark
Championship Manager Italia		1993	✓	✗	Domark
Championship Manager Italia '95		1995	✓	✗	Domark
Championship Water-Skiing	Championship Waterski Challenge, Dieux de la Mer	1987	✓	✗	Infogrames
Championship Wrestling		1986	✓	✗	Epyx
Chaos Engine, The		1993	✓	✗	Renegade
Charge of the Light Brigade	Carga de la Brigada Ligera (La)	1991	✓	✗	Impressions
Chariots of Wrath		1989	✓	✗	Impressions
Chase		1989	✓	✗	Mastertronic
Chase H.Q.		1989	✓	✗	Ocean Software
Chase HQ II: Special Criminal Investigation		1990	✓	✗	Ocean Software
Château du Monstre (Le)			✓	✗	Micro-C
Checkmate		1987	✓	✗	Robtek Ltd.
Chemicon			✓	✗	Tronic Verlag
Chess Champion 2175		1990	✓	✗	Oxford Softworks
Chess Player 2150		1990	✓	✗	Oxford Softworks
Chess Simulator		1990	✓	✗	Infogrames
Chessmaster 2000		1987	✓	✗	Electronic Arts
Chez le Marchand		1988	✓	✗	Pressimage
Chicago 30's		1989	✓	✗	US Gold
Chicago 90		1990	✓	✗	Microïds
Chichen Itza - Ci-u-than Trilogy III		1992	✓	✗	Aventuras AD
Chimera		1988	✓	✗	Pyramide
Chinese Karate		1989	✓	✗	Turtle Byte
Chip's Challenge		1990	✓	✗	US Gold
Chocolate Factory		1988	✓	✗	AVNI Inc.
Chopper X		1988	✓	✗	Paradox
Chronicles of Cyhagan, the First Tale - Disciples of Steel		1992	✓	✗	Megasoft Entertainment
Chronicles of Omega		1990	✓	✗	Atari (UK)
Chrono Quest	Explora	1988	✓	✗	Psygnosis
Chrono Quest II	Explora II	1990	✓	✗	Psygnosis
Chubby Gristle		1988	✓	✗	Grandslam Entertainment
Chuck Rock		1991	✓	✗	Core Design
Chuck Yeager's Advanced Flight Trainer		1990	✓	✗	Electronic Arts
Chuckie Egg		1988	✓	✗	Pick & Choose
Chuckie Egg II - Harry Returns in Time for Easter		1989	✓	✗	Pick & Choose
Circus Attractions		1989	✓	✗	Rainbow Arts
Circus Games		1989	✓	✗	Tynesoft
Cisco Heat		1991	✓	✗	Image Works
Civilization		1993	✓	✗	MicroProse
Cj in the USA		1992	✓	✗	Code Masters
Cj's Elephants Antics		1991	✓	✗	Code Masters
Classic Invaders		1989	✓	✗	Supernova Software
Classiques Vol.I		1986	✓	✗	Titus
Clever & Smart		1987	✓	✗	Magic Bytes
Cloud Kingdoms		1990	✓	✗	Millennium
Clown-O-Mania		1990	✓	✗	Starbyte
Club Backgammon		1988	✓	✗	California Dreams
Club Dominoes		1992	✓	✗	Infoworks
Cluedo - Master Detective		1990	✓	✗	Virgin Mastertronic
Cobra II		1989	✓	✗	Loriciel
Codename: ICEMAN		1991	✓	✗	Sierra On-Line
Cohort - Fighting for Rome		1991	✓	✗	Impressions
Cohort II - Fighting for Rome		1993	✓	✗	Impressions
Cokteloid			✓	✗	Coktel Vision
Collection Eurêka, La - Maths 6e-5e		1993	✓	✗	Génération 5
Colonel's Bequest, The		1991	✓	✗	Sierra On-Line
Colonial Conquest		1987	✓	✗	Strategic Simulations, Inc.
Colorado		1990	✓	✗	Silmarils
Colossus Chess X		1988	✓	✗	CDS Software
Combo Racer		1990	✓	✗	Gremlin Graphics
Commando		1989	✓	✗	Elite
Computer Diplomacy		1992	✓	✗	Avalon Hill
Computer Maniacs Diary 1989		1988	✓	✗	Domark
Computer Scrabble		1988	✓	✗	Leisure Genius
Computer Scrabble de Luxe		1988	✓	✗	Leisure Genius
Conflict - The Middle East Simulation		1990	✓	✗	Virgin Mastertronic
Conflict: Europe		1989	✓	✗	PSS
Confusion			✗	✓	WBW Game-Line
Connaître la France		1987	✓	✗	Pressimage
Conqueror		1990	✓	✗	Rainbow Arts
Conquest of Elysium		1997	✗	✓	Terre du Milieu (La)
Conquests of Camelot		1991	✓	✗	Sierra On-Line
Conquête de L'Ortographe (À la) - 4E / 3E			✓	✗	Génération 5
Conquête de L'Ortographe (À la) - 6E / 5E			✓	✗	Génération 5
Conquête de L'Ortographe (À la) - CE1 / CE2			✓	✗	Génération 5
Conquête de L'Ortographe (À la) - CM1 / CM2			✓	✗	Génération 5
Continental Circus		1989	✓	✗	Virgin Mastertronic
Cool Croc Twins		1992	✓	✗	Empire Software
Cool World		1992	✓	✗	Ocean Software
Corona Magica (La)		1990	✓	✗	OMK
Corporation		1990	✓	✗	Core Design
Corrupt			✓	✗	GLL Software
Corruption		1988	✓	✗	Rainbird
Corsarios			✓	✗	Opera Soft
Cortizone		1991	✓	✗	Zenobi Software
Cosmic Pirate		1989	✓	✗	Outlaw
Cosmic Relief	Terramex	1987	✓	✗	Datasoft
Cosmos		1988	✓	✗	Red Rat Software
Cougar Force		1991	✓	✗	Tomahawk
Count Duckula II		1992	✓	✗	Alternative Software
Count Duckula in No Sax Please, we're Egyptian		1990	✓	✗	Alternative Software
Crack Down		1990	✓	✗	US Gold
Crack'ed		1987	✓	✗	Atari Corporation
Crafton & Xunk		1987	✓	✗	Ère Informatique
Crash Garrett		1987	✓	✗	Ère Informatique
Crazy Cars		1988	✓	✗	Titus
Crazy Cars II		1989	✓	✗	Titus
Crazy Cars III		1992	✓	✗	Titus
Crazy Shot		1989	✓	✗	Loriciel
Creatures		1993	✓	✗	Thalamus
Creepy		1991	✓	✗	Atlantis Software
Cricket Captain		1990	✓	✗	D & H Games
Crime City		1992	✓	✗	Impressions
Crime Does Not Pay	Crime ne Paie Pas (Le)	1991	✓	✗	Titus
Crime Time		1991	✓	✗	Starbyte
Crime Wave		1991	✓	✗	Access Software
Crimson Crown		1985	✓	✗	Polarware, Inc.
Crossbow - The Legend of William Tell		1990	✓	✗	Screen 7
Crown		1990	✓	✗	Starbyte
Crown of Creation 3D		1997	✗	✓	Terre du Milieu (La)
Cruise for a Corpse	Croisière pour un Cadavre	1991	✓	✗	Delphine Software
Cryptographer (The)			✓	✗	Fair Dinkum Technologies
Crystal Castles		1986	✓	✗	Atari Corporation
Crystal Kingdom Dizzy		1993	✓	✗	Code Masters
Crystals of Arborea		1991	✓	✗	Silmarils
Curse of Ra (The)	Ra	1990	✓	✗	Rainbow Arts
Curse of the Azure Bonds		1991	✓	✗	Strategic Simulations, Inc.
Custodian		1989	✓	✗	Hewson
Cutthroats		1985	✓	✗	Infocom
Cyber Assault		1992	✓	✗	Trojan Software
Cyberball		1990	✓	✗	Domark
Cybercon III		1991	✓	✗	US Gold
Cybercop		1991	✓	✗	Impressions
CyberDrome - Hoverjet Simulator		1993	✓	✗	Rhea-FX
Cybermind - Planet of Riddle		1988	✓	✗	Ubi Soft
Cybernoid		1988	✓	✗	Hewson
Cybernoid II - The Revenge		1989	✓	✗	Hewson
Cybertron		1988	✓	✗	Pressimage
D-Day		1993	✓	✗	Futura
D/Generation		1992	✓	✗	Mindscape
Daily Double Horse Racing		1989	✓	✗	CDS Software
Dal'X		1995	✓	✗	Mediagogo
Dalek Attack		1993	✓	✗	Alternative Software
Daley Thompson's Olympic Challenge		1988	✓	✗	Ocean Software
Dame Scanner		1986	✓	✗	Chip
Dames 3D			✓	✗	Cobra Soft
Dames Grand-Maître		1988	✓	✗	Cobra Soft
Dames Simulator		1990	✓	✗	Infogrames
Damocles		1990	✓	✗	Novagen Software (UK)
Dan Dare III - The Escape		1990	✓	✗	Virgin Games
Darius+		1990	✓	✗	Edge (The)
Dark Castle		1987	✓	✗	Three Sixty Pacific
Dark Century		1990	✓	✗	Titus
Dark Fusion		1989	✓	✗	Gremlin Graphics
Dark Side		1989	✓	✗	MicroProse
Dark Tower (The)		1991	✓	✗	Zenobi Software
Dark-Sat		1990	✓	✗	Loriciel
Darkest Road (The)		1992	✓	✗	Zenobi Software
Darkland		1990	✓	✗	New Deal Productions
Darkman		1991	✓	✗	Ocean Software
Davy Jones Locker		1991	✓	✗	Zenobi Software
Day at the Races (A)		1989	✓	✗	Team Software
Day of the Pharaoh	Nil Dieu Vivant	1989	✓	✗	Rainbow Arts
Day of the Viper		1989	✓	✗	Accolade
Days of Thunder		1990	✓	✗	Mindscape
Deadline		1986	✓	✗	Infocom
Death Trap		1991	✓	✗	Anco Software
Deathbringer		1991	✓	✗	Empire Software
Deathstrike		1987	✓	✗	Talent Computer Systems
Début		1990	✓	✗	Pandora
Decimal Dungeon		1987	✓	✗	Unicorn Software
Deep (The)		1989	✓	✗	US Gold
Deep Space		1986	✓	✗	Psygnosis
Deep Thought		1988	✓	✗	Galactic
Defender II		1990	✓	✗	Atari (UK)
Defender of the Crown		1987	✓	✗	Cinemaware Corporation
Defenders of the Earth		1990	✓	✗	Enigma Variations
Deflektor		1988	✓	✗	Gremlin Graphics
Déjà Vu		1987	✓	✗	Mindscape
Déjà Vu II - Lost in Las Vegas		1989	✓	✗	Mindscape
Deliverance		1992	✓	✗	21st Century Entertainment
Delta Patrol		1985	✓	✗	Other Valley Software
Demenage Man		1989	✓	✗	Microvideo Games
Demon Blue			✓	✗	Micro-Value
Demon's Tomb - The Awakening		1990	✓	✗	Melbourne House
Demon's Winter		1989	✓	✗	Strategic Simulations, Inc.
Demoniac		1988	✓	✗	Softbook
Demoniak		1991	✓	✗	Palace Software
Dennis Wheatley Presents a Murder Mystery - Herewith the Clues!		1990	✓	✗	Computer Rentals Limited (CRL)
Denver Présente Je Découvre les Formes			✓	✗	Loriciel
Denver Présente Je M'éveille En Jouant		1989	✓	✗	Loriciel
Denver Présente Je Mémorise		1989	✓	✗	Loriciel
Depasoft		1988	✓	✗	Pressimage
Desktop Solitaire		1998	✗	✓	Kordes Development
Desolator		1988	✓	✗	US Gold
Destination Maths 6e/5e		1989	✓	✗	Génération 5
Destination Maths CE1/CE2		1989	✓	✗	Génération 5
Destination Maths CM1/CM2		1989	✓	✗	Génération 5
Destruction Imminent		1996	✓	✗	MicroMagic
Deuteros - The Next Millennium		1991	✓	✗	Activision
Devious Designs		1991	✓	✗	Image Works
Dia Mas Largo (El)		1994	✗	✓	Mobilectro
Diablo		1987	✓	✗	Robtek Ltd.
Diamond Mike		1987	✓	✗	XLEnt Software
Dick Tracy		1991	✓	✗	Titus
Die Hard II - Die Harder		1992	✓	✗	Grandslam Entertainment
Digger		1987	✓	✗	Data Beutner KG
Diosa de Cozumel		1990	✓	✗	Aventuras AD
Disc		1991	✓	✗	Loriciel
Discovery - In the Steps of Columbus		1992	✓	✗	Impressions
Dive Bomber	Night Raider	1988	✓	✗	Gremlin Graphics
Division One '92	Premier Soccer	1992	✓	✗	Midnight Oil (The)
Dizzy Dice		1990	✓	✗	Smash 16
Dizzy Panic		1992	✓	✗	Code Masters
Dizzy Prince of the Yolkfolk		1992	✓	✗	Code Masters
Dizzy Wizard		1988	✓	✗	Robtek Ltd.
Dobývání Hradu II		1991	✓	✗	JRC
Doc Croc's Outrageous Adventures!		1993	✓	✗	Zeppelin Games
Dogfight - 80 Years of Aerial Warfare		1993	✓	✗	MicroProse
Dogs of War		1989	✓	✗	Elite
Domes of Sha		1989	✓	✗	River Software
Domination		1990	✓	✗	Magic Bytes
Dominator		1989	✓	✗	System 3 Software
Dominium		1992	✓	✗	Microïds
Donald Duck's Playground		1986	✓	✗	Sierra On-Line
Donald's Alphabet Chase	Donald et l'Alphabet Magique, Donald und das Magische Alphabet, Paperino Impara l'Alfabeto, Caza del Alabeto de Donald (La)		✓	✗	Disney Software
Doodle Bug		1992	✓	✗	Core Design
Double Dare		1991	✓	✗	Alternative Software
Double Dragon		1988	✓	✗	DRO Soft
Double Dragon 3: The Rosetta Stone		1991	✓	✗	Sales Curve (The)
Double Dragon II: The Revenge		1989	✓	✗	Virgin Mastertronic
Dr. Doom's Revenge		1990	✓	✗	Empire Software
Dr. Jekyll & Mr. Hyde		1992	✓	✗	Zenobi Software
Dr. Zock		1987	✓	✗	Peksoft
Drachen von Laas (Die)		1990	✓	✗	Dragonware Games
Dragon Breed		1990	✓	✗	Activision
Dragon Force		1988	✓	✗	Interstel Corporation
Dragon Lord (16-32 Diffusion)		1990	✓	✗	16/32 Diffusion
Dragon Lord (Spotlight)	Dragons Breath	1990	✓	✗	Palace Software
Dragon Scape		1989	✓	✗	Software Horizons Ltd.
Dragon Spirit		1989	✓	✗	Domark
Dragon's Lair		1990	✓	✗	ReadySoft
Dragon's Lair - Escape from Singe's Castle		1991	✓	✗	ReadySoft
Dragon's Lair II - TimeWarp		1991	✓	✗	ReadySoft
Dragon's Lair III - The Curse of Mordread		1993	✓	✗	ReadySoft
Dragonflight		1990	✓	✗	Thalion
Dragons of Flame		1989	✓	✗	Strategic Simulations, Inc.
Drakkhen		1989	✓	✗	Infogrames
Draughts		1990	✓	✗	Oxford Softworks
Dreadnoughts		1992	✓	✗	Turcan Research
Dream Zone		1988	✓	✗	Baudville
Drivin' Force		1990	✓	✗	Digital Magic Software
Drop down Words		1992	✓	✗	Shoestring Software
Duck Tales - The Quest for Gold	Bande à Picsou - La Ruée Vers L'or (La)	1990	✓	✗	Walt Disney Computer Software
Dugger (Herbie Stone in)		1988	✓	✗	Linel
Dungeon Master		1988	✓	✗	Faster than Light (FTL)
Dungeons, Amethysts, Alchemists'n Everythin'		1990	✓	✗	Atlantis Software
Dweabys Quest		1988	✓	✗	Epyx
Dyna Blaster		1993	✓	✗	Ubi Soft
Dynamite Düx		1989	✓	✗	Activision
Dynasty Wars		1990	✓	✗	US Gold
Dyter-07		1990	✓	✗	reLINE Software
E-Motion	Game of Harmony	1990	✓	✗	US Gold
Eagle Bearer		1988	✓	✗	Battle Honours
Eagle's Rider		1989	✓	✗	Microïds
East vs. West - Berlin 1948		1990	✓	✗	Rainbow Arts
Eco		1988	✓	✗	Ocean Software
Eco Phantoms		1991	✓	✗	Electronic Zoo
Edd the Duck!		1991	✓	✗	Zeppelin Games
Eden Blues		1987	✓	✗	Ère Informatique
Ego		1996	✓	✗	Goodman International
Electro Solitaire & 21			✓	✗	SoftLogik
Electronic Pool		1986	✓	✗	Microdeal
Elemental		1988	✓	✗	Lankhor
Elf (Micro-Value)		1988	✓	✗	Micro-Value
Elf (Ocean)		1991	✓	✗	Ocean Software
Eliminator		1988	✓	✗	Hewson
Elite		1988	✓	✗	Firebird (UK)
Ellisnore Diamond (The)		1991	✓	✗	Zenobi Software
Elvira - The Arcade Game		1992	✓	✗	Flair Software
Elvira II: The Jaws of Cerberus		1992	✓	✗	Accolade
Elvira: Mistress of the Dark	Elvira - La Aventura Fantastica	1991	✓	✗	Accolade
Emlyn Hughes Arcade Quiz		1990	✓	✗	Audiogenic Software Ltd. (ASL)
Emlyn Hughes International Soccer		1990	✓	✗	Audiogenic Software Ltd. (ASL)
Emmanuelle		1989	✓	✗	System 4
Emperor of the Mines		1989	✓	✗	Impressions
Empire: Wargame of the Century		1988	✓	✗	Interstel Corporation
Enchanted Cottage		1991	✓	✗	Zenobi Software
Enchanted Land		1990	✓	✗	Thalion
Enchanter		1985	✓	✗	Infocom
Encounter!		1991	✓	✗	Novagen Software (UK)
Encyclopedia of War: Ancient Battles		1990	✓	✗	Cases Computer Simulations Ltd.
End Day 2240		1991	✓	✗	Zenobi Software
Enduro Racer		1988	✓	✗	Activision
Enforcer (Methodic Solutions)		1988	✓	✗	Methodic Solutions
Enforcer (Trojan)		1992	✓	✗	Trojan Software
England Championship Special		1991	✓	✗	Grandslam Entertainment
Énigme à Madrid		1987	✓	✗	Coktel Vision
Énigme à Munich		1986	✓	✗	Coktel Vision
Énigme à Oxford	Enigma en Oxford	1987	✓	✗	Coktel Vision
Enigme a Oxford (Nouvelle Version)		1988	✓	✗	Coktel Vision
Enquête aux U.S.A. (Across the U.S.A.)		1990	✓	✗	Nathan
Enterprise		1990	✓	✗	Atari (UK)
Epi-Lepsy		1995	✗	✓	16/32 Systems
Epic		1992	✓	✗	Ocean Software
Equation Builder		1988	✓	✗	Atari Corporation
Erebus		1986	✓	✗	Titus
Erik		1992	✓	✗	Atlantis Software
Erotika			✓	✗	A&S Software
Escape from the Planet of the Robot Monsters		1990	✓	✗	Domark
Eskimo Games		1989	✓	✗	Magic Bytes
Espace Formes et Couleurs - Maternelle		1991	✓	✗	Pressimage
España - The Games' 92		1992	✓	✗	Ocean Software
Espionage		1988	✓	✗	Grandslam Entertainment
Esprit		1989	✓	✗	Application Systems Heidelberg
Esprits Français - CE1-CE2 - Volume 1		1991	✓	✗	Lankhor
Esprits Français - CE1-CE2 - Volume 2		1991	✓	✗	Lankhor
Esprits Français - CM1-CM2 - Volume 1		1992	✓	✗	Lankhor
Esprits Français - CM1-CM2 - Volume 2		1991	✓	✗	Lankhor
Esprits Maths - CE1-CE2 - Volume 1		1991	✓	✗	Lankhor
Esprits Maths - CE1-CE2 - Volume 2		1991	✓	✗	Lankhor
Esprits Maths - CM1-CM2 - Volume 1		1991	✓	✗	Lankhor
Esprits Maths - CM1-CM2 - Volume 2		1991	✓	✗	Lankhor
ESS - European Space Simulator		1989	✓	✗	Coktel Vision
Essex		1986	✓	✗	Brøderbund Software
Eswat		1991	✓	✗	US Gold
Eurêka Maths - 4E / 3E			✓	✗	Génération 5
Eurêka Maths - CE1 / CE2			✓	✗	Génération 5
Eurêka Maths - CM1 / CM2			✓	✗	Génération 5
Euro Soccer '88	Peter Beardsley's International Football	1988	✓	✗	Grandslam Entertainment
European Champions	Olympique de Marseille	1994	✓	✗	Ocean Software
European Championship 92		1992	✓	✗	Elite
European Football Champ		1992	✓	✗	Domark
European Soccer Challenge		1990	✓	✗	Smash 16
European Superleague		1991	✓	✗	CDS Software
Evilution		1991	✓	✗	Nigma Adventures
Evolution Dino Dudes		1993	✗	✓	Atari Corporation
Exile		1991	✓	✗	Audiogenic Software Ltd. (ASL)
Exolon		1988	✓	✗	Hewson
Explora III - Sous le Signe du Serpent		1990	✓	✗	Infomédia
Expressing		1988	✓	✗	Prestasoft
Extase		1990	✓	✗	Virgin Games
Extensor		1988	✓	✗	Players
Exterminator		1990	✓	✗	Audiogenic Software Ltd. (ASL)
Eye		1987	✓	✗	Endurance Games
Eye of Horus		1989	✓	✗	Logotron
F-15 Strike Eagle		1985	✓	✗	MicroProse
F-15 Strike Eagle II		1991	✓	✗	MicroProse
F-16 Combat Pilot		1989	✓	✗	Digital Integration
F-19 Stealth Fighter		1990	✓	✗	MicroProse
F1	Vroom Multi-Player	1994	✓	✗	Domark
F1 Manager		1990	✓	✗	Simulmondo
F1 Tornado		1992	✓	✗	Zeppelin Games
F29 Retaliator		1989	✓	✗	Ocean Software
Face Off (Anco)	Ice Hockey	1989	✓	✗	Anco Software
Face Off (Krisalis)		1991	✓	✗	Krisalis
Fahrenheit 451		1986	✓	✗	Telarium
Falcon		1988	✓	✗	Spectrum Holobyte
Fallen Angel		1989	✓	✗	Screen 7
Famous Five - Five on a Treasure Island (The)		1991	✓	✗	Enigma Variations
Fantasy World Dizzy		1992	✓	✗	Code Masters
Fascination		1991	✓	✗	Coktel Vision
Fast Food!		1991	✓	✗	Code Masters
Fast Lane! - The Spice Engineering Challenge		1989	✓	✗	Artronic Products Limited
Fate: Gates of Dawn		1991	✓	✗	reLINE Software
FC Manager			✓	✗	Impressions
Federation Quest I - BSS Jane Seymour		1990	✓	✗	Gremlin Graphics
Fernandez Must Die		1988	✓	✗	Image Works
Ferrari Formula One		1989	✓	✗	Electronic Arts
Fétiche Maya (Le)	Maya	1989	✓	✗	Silmarils
Feudal Lords		1991	✓	✗	Impressions
Fiendish Freddy’s Big Top o’Fun		1989	✓	✗	Mindscape
Fifth Eskadra - Modern Naval Combat in the Mediterranian Sea		1987	✓	✗	Simulations Canada
Fighter Bomber		1990	✓	✗	Activision
Fighter Command		1991	✓	✗	Impressions
Fighting Soccer		1990	✓	✗	Activision
Final Assault	Bivouac, Chamonix Challenge	1988	✓	✗	Epyx
Final Blow		1992	✓	✗	Sales Curve (The)
Final Command		1990	✓	✗	Ubi Soft
Final Conflict (The)		1990	✓	✗	Impressions
Final Fight		1991	✓	✗	US Gold
Final Legacy		1989	✓	✗	Atari Corporation
Fire and Brimstone		1990	✓	✗	Firebird (UK)
Fire and Forget		1988	✓	✗	Titus
Fire and Forget II - The Death Convoy		1990	✓	✗	Titus
Fire and Ice		1992	✓	✗	Mindscape
Fire Brigade - The Battle for Kiev 1943		1990	✓	✗	Panther Games
Fire Force		1993	✓	✗	ICE
Fire Rescue		1989	✓	✗	16/32 Diffusion
Fire!		1990	✓	✗	New Deal Productions
Fireball		1990	✓	✗	MicroProse
Fireblaster		1989	✓	✗	Prism Leisure
Firehawk		1993	✓	✗	Code Masters
Firestar		1992	✓	✗	Trojan Software
Firestorm		1985	✓	✗	Inner Fire Software
Firezone		1989	✓	✗	Electronic Arts
First Class with the Shoe People		1993	✓	✗	Gremlin Graphics
First Contact		1989	✓	✗	Rainbird
First Person Pinball		1989	✓	✗	Tynesoft
First Samurai		1991	✓	✗	Image Works
Fish!		1988	✓	✗	Rainbird
Fist of Fury	Karate King, Karate Master	1986	✓	✗	Kingsoft
Fleet Med		1986	✓	✗	Simulations Canada
Flight of the Intruder		1991	✓	✗	Mirrorsoft
Flight Simulator II	Flugsimulator II	1987	✓	✗	SubLOGIC
Flimbo's Quest		1990	✓	✗	System 3 Software
Flintstones (The)	Fred Feuerstein	1988	✓	✗	Grandslam Entertainment
Flip Flop		1986	✓	✗	Kingsoft
Flip Side		1985	✓	✗	MichTron
Flip-It and Magnose - Water Carriers from Mars		1990	✓	✗	Image Works
Flipping The Lid		1993	✓	✗	MicroMagic
Flood		1990	✓	✗	Electronic Arts
Flying Shark		1988	✓	✗	Firebird (UK)
FoFT - Federation of Free Traders	Federation	1989	✓	✗	Gremlin Graphics
Fool's Errand, The		1990	✓	✗	Miles Computing
Football Champ		1992	✓	✗	Simulmondo
Football Crazy		1990	✓	✗	Esp Software
Football Director			✓	✗	D & H Games
Football Director II		1988	✓	✗	D & H Games
Football Manager		1988	✓	✗	Addictive Games
Football Manager 2		1988	✓	✗	Addictive Games
Football Manager World Cup Edition		1990	✓	✗	Addictive Games
Football Masters		1991	✓	✗	Esp Software
Football Simulation		1990	✓	✗	SPORT Soft
Footballer of the Year II		1990	✓	✗	Gremlin Graphics
Forbidden Quest 4.10		1985	✓	✗	Pryority Software
Forgotten Worlds		1989	✓	✗	US Gold
Formula 1 Grand Prix (Microprose)		1991	✓	✗	MicroProse
Formula 1 Grand Prix (Tynesoft)		1987	✓	✗	Tynesoft
Fort Apache		1991	✓	✗	Impressions
Foundations Waste		1988	✓	✗	Exocet Software
Fourmi Story		1989	✓	✗	16/32 Diffusion
Fraction Action		1987	✓	✗	Unicorn Software
Fraction Goblin			✓	✗	Coombe Valley Software
Frankenstein		1992	✓	✗	Zeppelin Games
Freddy Hardest in South Manhattan	Guardian Angel	1989	✓	✗	Dinamic
Free Climbing		1989	✓	✗	Zafiro Software
Freedom - Les Guerriers de l'Ombre / Rebels in the Darkness	Freedom - Les Guerriers de l'Ombre / Die Krieger des Schattens	1993	✓	✗	Coktel Vision
Frenetic		1991	✓	✗	Core Design
Frontier: Elite II		1994	✓	✗	Gametek
Frontline		1990	✓	✗	Cases Computer Simulations Ltd.
Frost Byte		1988	✓	✗	Micro-Value
Fruit Machine		1990	✓	✗	Byte Back
Fugger (Die)		1987	✓	✗	Bomico
Full Count Baseball		1987	✓	✗	Lance Haffner Games
Full Metal Planète		1989	✓	✗	Infogrames
Fun School 2 - For 6 to 8 year olds	Fun School 2 - Pour les 6 à 8 ans, Spielend Lernen 2 - 6 Bis 8 Jahre	1989	✓	✗	Database Educational Software
Fun School 2 - Over 8's		1989	✓	✗	Database Educational Software
Fun School 2 - Under 6s	Spielend Lernen 2 - bis 6 Jahre	1989	✓	✗	Database Educational Software
Fun School 3 - 5 to 7s	Fun School 3 - L'École des Malins - Pour les 5 à 7 ans	1990	✓	✗	Database Educational Software
Fun School 3 - Over 7s		1990	✓	✗	Database Educational Software
Fun School 3 - Under 5s		1990	✓	✗	Database Educational Software
Fun School 4 - For 5 to 7 year olds			✓	✗	Europress Software
Fun School 4 - For 7 to 11 Year Olds			✓	✗	Europress Software
Fun School 4 - Under 5s			✓	✗	Europress Software
Fusion		1989	✓	✗	Electronic Arts
Future Basketball		1990	✓	✗	Hewson
Future Bike Simulator		1990	✓	✗	Hi-Tec Software
Future Sport		1989	✓	✗	Computer Rentals Limited (CRL)
Future Wars	Future Wars - Adventures in Time, Voyageurs du Temps (Les)	1989	✓	✗	Delphine Software
Fuzzball		1987	✓	✗	Eaglesoft
G-Loc		1992	✓	✗	US Gold
G.Nius		1988	✓	✗	Lankhor
Galactic Conqueror		1989	✓	✗	Titus
Galactic Empire		1991	✓	✗	Coktel Vision
Galaxy Force II	Galaxy Force	1989	✓	✗	Activision
Galdregon's Domain	Death Bringer	1989	✓	✗	Pandora
Gambler (The)		1986	✓	✗	Keypunch Software
Gambler (The) (Diamond)		1988	✓	✗	Robtek Ltd.
Game Over II		1988	✓	✗	Dinamic
Games - Summer Edition (The)	Go for Gold	1989	✓	✗	US Gold
Games - Winter Edition (The)		1989	✓	✗	Epyx
Garfield - Winter's Tail		1989	✓	✗	Edge (The)
Garfield: Big Fat Hairy Deal		1988	✓	✗	Edge (The)
Gary Lineker's Hot-Shot!		1989	✓	✗	Gremlin Graphics
Gary Lineker's Super Skills		1988	✓	✗	Gremlin Graphics
Gateway		1986	✓	✗	Pryority Software
Gato		1986	✓	✗	Spectrum Holobyte
Gauntlet		1987	✓	✗	Mindscape
Gauntlet II		1988	✓	✗	Mindscape
Gauntlet III - The Final Quest		1991	✓	✗	US Gold
Gazza II		1991	✓	✗	Empire Software
Gazza's Super Soccer	Anders Limpar's Proffs Fotboll, Bodo Illgner's Super Soccer	1989	✓	✗	Empire Software
GBA Championship Basketball Two on Two		1986	✓	✗	Gamestar
Gédéon le Caméléon		1988	✓	✗	France Image Logiciel (FIL)
Geisha		1990	✓	✗	Coktel Vision
Gem Stone Legend		1990	✓	✗	Loriciel
Gem'X		1992	✓	✗	Demonware
Gemini Wing		1989	✓	✗	Virgin Mastertronic
General Store		1988	✓	✗	Atari Corporation
Génies De L'Académie, Les - Senior			✓	✗	Génération 5
Germ Crazy		1991	✓	✗	Electronic Zoo
Get Dexter		1988	✓	✗	Mastertronic
Get Dexter II	Ange de Cristal (L')	1988	✓	✗	Ère Informatique
Gettysburg		1990	✓	✗	Atari (UK)
GFL Championship Football		1987	✓	✗	Gamestar
Ghost Battle		1991	✓	✗	Thalion
Ghost Chaser		1991	✓	✗	Byte Back
Ghostbusters II		1989	✓	✗	Activision
Ghosts 'n Goblins		1990	✓	✗	Elite
Ghouls 'n' Ghosts		1992	✓	✗	US Gold
Gilbert - Escape from Drill		1989	✓	✗	Alternative Software
Gladiators		1989	✓	✗	Smash 16
Global Commander	Armageddon Man (The)	1988	✓	✗	Datasoft
Glücksrad		1992	✓	✗	Gametek
Gnome Ranger		1987	✓	✗	Level 9 Computing
Go Player		1990	✓	✗	Oxford Softworks
Go-Moku / Renju		1989	✓	✗	Atari Corporation
Goal!		1994	✓	✗	Virgin Games
Gobliiins		1992	✓	✗	Coktel Vision
Gobliins II - The Prince Buffoon		1992	✓	✗	Coktel Vision
Godfather (The)		1992	✓	✗	US Gold
Gods		1991	✓	✗	Renegade
Golan Front - The 1973 Arab / Israeli War in the North		1987	✓	✗	Simulations Canada
Gold of the Americas - The Conquest of the New World		1990	✓	✗	Strategic Studies Group (SSG)
Gold of the Aztecs (The)		1990	✓	✗	US Gold
Gold of the Realm		1988	✓	✗	Magnetic Images
Gold Rush!		1989	✓	✗	Sierra On-Line
Golden Axe		1990	✓	✗	Virgin Mastertronic
Golden Island		1994	✗	✓	WBW Game-Line
Golden Oldies: Volume 1 - Computer Software Classics		1986	✓	✗	Software Toolworks (The)
Golden Path, The		1987	✓	✗	Firebird (UK)
Goldrunner		1987	✓	✗	MichTron
Goldrunner II		1988	✓	✗	Microdeal
Gone Fish'n	Reel Fish'n	1987	✓	✗	Interstel Corporation
Gone Fish'n - Tournament Version		1987	✓	✗	Interstel Corporation
Goofy's Railway Express	Dingo et le Train Express, Goofy und der Phantastische Schnellzug, Rapido di Pippo (Il), Tren Expreso di Goofy (El)		✓	✗	Disney Software
Graeme Souness Soccer Manager		1992	✓	✗	Zeppelin Games
Graeme Souness Vector Soccer		1991	✓	✗	Zeppelin Games
Graffiti Man		1987	✓	✗	Rainbow Arts
Graham Gooch World Class Cricket		1993	✓	✗	Audiogenic Software Ltd. (ASL)
Graham Taylor's Soccer Challenge		1992	✓	✗	Krisalis
Graham Taylor's Soccer Challenge - England Edition		1992	✓	✗	Krisalis
Grail (The)		1988	✓	✗	Microdeal
Grand Fleet - Tactical Naval Combat in the North Sea 1906-1920		1989	✓	✗	Simulations Canada
Grand Monster Slam		1989	✓	✗	Rainbow Arts
Grand Prix 500 II	Hot Rubber	1990	✓	✗	Microïds
Grand Prix 500cc		1988	✓	✗	Microïds
Grand Prix Master		1989	✓	✗	Dinamic
Gravity		1990	✓	✗	Image Works
Gravon: Real Virtuality		1995	✗	✓	JRC
Great Battles 1789 - 1865		1986	✓	✗	Royal Software
Great Giana Sisters (The)		1988	✓	✗	Rainbow Arts
Great Napoleonic Battles		1991	✓	✗	Impressions
Greg Norman's Ultimate Golf	Greg Norman's Shark Attack! - The Ultimate Golf Simulator	1990	✓	✗	Gremlin Graphics
Gremlins II - The New Batch		1990	✓	✗	Elite
Grey Seas, Grey Skies - Tactical Modern Naval Combat		1987	✓	✗	Simulations Canada
Gridiron!		1986	✓	✗	Bethesda Softworks
Gridrunner	Super Gridrunner'	1989	✓	✗	Llamasoft
Grimblood		1990	✓	✗	Virgin Mastertronic
Growth		1988	✓	✗	Axxiom
Guardians		1991	✓	✗	Loriciel
Guild of Thieves, The		1987	✓	✗	Firebird (USA)
Guillotine			✓	✗	Micro-C
Gunship		1986	✓	✗	MicroProse
Guy Roux Manager - Planète Foot		1993	✓	✗	Domark
Guy Spy and the Crystals of Armageddon		1992	✓	✗	ReadySoft
Hacker		1985	✓	✗	Activision
Hacker II: The Doomsday Papers		1986	✓	✗	Activision
Hades Nebula		1987	✓	✗	Nexus
Hamlet Harddisc			✓	✗	Alphatron Computersystems
Hammer Boy		1990	✓	✗	Dinamic
Hammer of Grimmold (The)		1988	✓	✗	River Software
Hammerfist		1990	✓	✗	Activision
Hanse		1986	✓	✗	Ariolasoft
Hard Drivin'		1989	✓	✗	Domark
Hard Drivin' II - Drive Harder		1991	✓	✗	Domark
Hard Nova		1991	✓	✗	Electronic Arts
Hard'n'Heavy		1989	✓	✗	reLINE Software
HardBall!		1987	✓	✗	Accolade
Harlequin		1992	✓	✗	Gremlin Graphics
Harley Davidson - The Road to Sturgis		1990	✓	✗	Mindscape
Harricana - Raid International Motoneige		1990	✓	✗	Loriciel
Harrier Combat Simulator	High Roller, Strike Force Harrier	1988	✓	✗	Mindscape
Harrier Strike Mission		1986	✓	✗	Miles Computing
HATE - Hostile All Terrain Encounter		1989	✓	✗	Gremlin Graphics
Haus (Das)		1990	✓	✗	Ariolasoft
Hawkeye		1989	✓	✗	Thalamus
Head Coach		1988	✓	✗	Midnight Oil (The)
Head Coach v3		1988	✓	✗	Qualsoft
Head Over Heels		1989	✓	✗	Ocean Software
Heatwave	Powerboat USA	1990	✓	✗	Accolade
Heavy Metal		1989	✓	✗	US Gold
Heavy Metal Heroes	Outlands	1991	✓	✗	Players
Heimdall		1992	✓	✗	Core Design
Hell Bent		1988	✓	✗	Novagen Software (UK)
Hellfire Attack		1988	✓	✗	Martech
Hellowoon - Das Geheimnis des Zauberstabs		1987	✓	✗	Ariolasoft
Hellraider		1990	✓	✗	Atari (UK)
Hellraiser		1989	✓	✗	Exocet Software
Helter Skelter		1988	✓	✗	Audiogenic Software Ltd. (ASL)
Helter Skelter (Enhanced)		1990	✓	✗	Audiogenic Software Ltd. (ASL)
Henrietta's Book of Spells		1991	✓	✗	Lander Software
HERO - Human Extraction & Rescue Operation		1994	✓	✗	Independently Developed Software (IDS)
Hero's Quest I: So You Want to be a Hero	Quest for Glory	1989	✓	✗	Sierra On-Line
HeroQuest		1991	✓	✗	Gremlin Graphics
Hex		1985	✓	✗	Mark of the Unicorn
High Steel		1989	✓	✗	Screen 7
Highway Patrol 2	Highway Patrol	1989	✓	✗	Microïds
Hill Street Blues		1991	✓	✗	Krisalis
Hillsfar		1989	✓	✗	Strategic Simulations, Inc.
Hippo Backgammon		1985	✓	✗	Hippopotamus Software, Inc.
Hitchhiker's Guide to the Galaxy (The)		1985	✓	✗	Activision
HKM - Human Killing Machine		1989	✓	✗	US Gold
Hlava Kasandry		1993	✓	✗	JRC
HMS Cobra		1987	✓	✗	Cobra Soft
Hockey Pista		1990	✓	✗	Lindasoft
Hole in One Golf	ST Golf	1986	✓	✗	Artworx
Hollywood Hijinx		1986	✓	✗	Infocom
Hollywood Hustler		1994	✓	✗	Desert Star Software
Hollywood Poker		1986	✓	✗	Robtek Ltd.
Hollywood Poker Pro		1989	✓	✗	reLINE Software
Home Casino Poker 3b		1988	✓	✗	Dubl Dubl Funware
Hong Kong Phooey - No. 1 Super Guy		1990	✓	✗	Hi-Tec Software
Hook		1992	✓	✗	Ocean Software
Hooray for Henrietta			✓	✗	Lander Software
Horizon CE1		1990	✓	✗	Coktel Vision
Horror Zombies from the Crypt		1990	✓	✗	Millennium
Hostages	Opération Jupiter	1989	✓	✗	Infogrames
Hot Rod		1990	✓	✗	Activision
Hotball		1988	✓	✗	16/32 Diffusion
Hotshot		1988	✓	✗	Addictive Games
Hound of Shadow (The)		1989	✓	✗	Electronic Arts
Hover Sprint		1992	✓	✗	Code Masters
Hoyle - Book of Games - Vol. I		1989	✓	✗	Sierra On-Line
Hoyle - Book of Games - Vol. II		1990	✓	✗	Sierra On-Line
Huckleberry Hound in Hollywood Capers		1993	✓	✗	Alternative Software
Hudson Hawk		1991	✓	✗	Ocean Software
Hunt for Red October (The) (Grandslam)	Jagd auf Roter Oktober	1988	✓	✗	Grandslam Entertainment
Hunt for Red October (The) (Software Toolworks)		1988	✓	✗	Software Toolworks (The)
Hunter		1991	✓	✗	Activision
Hunter Killer		1990	✓	✗	Virgin Mastertronic
Hustler		1989	✓	✗	Go-dax
Hydra		1991	✓	✗	Domark
Hyperdome		1988	✓	✗	Exocet Software
Hyperforce		1989	✓	✗	Addictive Games
Hypnotic Land		1992	✓	✗	Lindasoft
I Ludicrus		1989	✓	✗	Computer Rentals Limited (CRL)
I Play 3-D Soccer		1991	✓	✗	Simulmondo
I, Ball		1988	✓	✗	Silverbird
Ice and Fire - The Wizards		1986	✓	✗	International Computer Connectio
IK+ (International Karate +)		1988	✓	✗	System 3 Software
Ikari Warriors		1988	✓	✗	Elite
Illusionen			✓	✗	ASM
Immortal (The)		1990	✓	✗	Electronic Arts
Imperium		1990	✓	✗	Electronic Arts
Impossamole		1990	✓	✗	Gremlin Graphics
Impossible Mission II		1988	✓	✗	Epyx
Impulse		1997	✗	✓	Terre du Milieu (La)
In 80 Days Around the World	Around the World in 80 Days	1987	✓	✗	Rainbow Arts
In Harm's Way - Tactical Naval Combat in the Pacific, 1943-1944		1988	✓	✗	Simulations Canada
Incantation		1988	✓	✗	France Image Logiciel (FIL)
Indian Mission		1988	✓	✗	Coktel Vision
Indiana Jones and the Fate of Atlantis - The Action Game		1992	✓	✗	Lucasfilm Games
Indiana Jones and the Last Crusade - The Action Game		1989	✓	✗	Lucasfilm Games
Indiana Jones and the Last Crusade - The Graphic Adventure		1989	✓	✗	Lucasfilm Games
Indiana Jones and the Temple of Doom		1987	✓	✗	Mindscape
Indoor Sports		1987	✓	✗	Databyte
Indy 500		1987	✓	✗	Methodic Solutions
Indy Heat		1992	✓	✗	Sales Curve (The)
Infestation		1990	✓	✗	Psygnosis
Infidel		1985	✓	✗	Infocom
Ingrid's Back		1988	✓	✗	Level 9 Computing
Insector Hecti in the Inter Change		1991	✓	✗	Hi-Tec Software
Insects in Space		1991	✓	✗	Hewson
Inspektor Griffu Ein Toter hat Heimweh		1990	✓	✗	Ariolasoft
International 3D Tennis		1990	✓	✗	Palace Software
International Championship Athletics		1991	✓	✗	Hawk
International Ice Hockey		1991	✓	✗	Zeppelin Games
International Ninja Rabbits		1991	✓	✗	Micro-Value
International Rugby Challenge		1993	✓	✗	Domark
International Soccer	ST Soccer	1988	✓	✗	Microdeal
International Soccer Challenge		1990	✓	✗	MicroProse
International Sports Challenge		1992	✓	✗	Empire Software
International Truck Racing		1993	✓	✗	Zeppelin Games
Interphase		1989	✓	✗	Image Works
Into the Eagle's Nest		1987	✓	✗	Mindscape
Into the Mystic		1991	✓	✗	Zenobi Software
Intruder (The)		1989	✓	✗	Ubi Soft
Invasion		1987	✓	✗	MichTron
Invaze z Aldebaranu		1991	✓	✗	JRC
Inve$t		1990	✓	✗	Starbyte
Iron Lord		1989	✓	✗	Ubi Soft
Iron Trackers		1989	✓	✗	Microïds
Ishar		1992	✓	✓	Silmarils
Ishar 2		1993	✓	✓	Silmarils
Ishar 3		1994	✓	✓	Silmarils
ISS - Incredible Shrinking Sphere		1989	✓	✗	Electric Dreams
Italy 1990	Italia 1990 (Erbe), Italy 1990: Winners Edition, Italy 1990: L'Édition des Champions	1990	✓	✗	US Gold
Italy 1990 (Code Masters)		1990	✓	✗	Code Masters
Ivan Ironman Stewart's Super Off Road		1990	✓	✗	Virgin Mastertronic
Ivanhoe		1990	✓	✗	Ocean Software
Iznogud		1987	✓	✗	Infogrames
Jabato vs. Imperio		1989	✓	✗	Aventuras AD
Jack Nicklaus' Greatest 18 Holes of Major Championship Golf		1990	✓	✗	Accolade
Jade Stone (The)		1989	✓	✗	Page 6 Software
Jahangir Khan World Championship Squash		1991	✓	✗	Krisalis
James Pond		1990	✓	✗	Millennium
James Pond II - Codename Robocod		1992	✓	✗	Millennium
Jason et la Toison d'Or		1988	✓	✗	Excalibur Publishing
Jaws	Tiburon	1989	✓	✗	Screen 7
Je Reconstitue les Fables de La Fontaine		1989	✓	✗	Carraz
Je Répare ma Voiture		1988	✓	✗	Pressimage
Jet		1988	✓	✗	SubLOGIC
Jetsons - The Computer Game		1991	✓	✗	Hi-Tec Premier Software
Jigsaw Puzzlemania		1989	✓	✗	Artworx
Jigspell		1989	✓	✗	HAT Software
Jim Power in Mutant Planet		1992	✓	✗	Loriciel
Jimmy White's 'Whirlwind' Snooker		1991	✓	✗	Virgin Mastertronic
Jinks			✓	✗	Rainbow Arts
Jinxter		1987	✓	✗	Rainbird
Joan of Arc	Jeanne d'Arc, Juana de Arco	1988	✓	✗	US Gold
Jocky Wilson's Darts		1990	✓	✗	Zeppelin Games
Joe Blade		1988	✓	✗	Players
Joe Blade II		1989	✓	✗	Players
John Barnes European Football		1992	✓	✗	Krisalis
John Lowe's Ultimate Darts		1989	✓	✗	Gremlin Graphics
Joueur de Cartes (Le)		1990	✓	✗	Pressimage
Journey to the Centre of the Earth	Voyage au Centre de la Terre, Reise zum Mittelpunkt der Erde	1989	✓	✗	Chip
Journey to the Lair		1985	✓	✗	MichTron
Joust		1985	✓	✗	Atari Corporation
Judge Dredd		1990	✓	✗	Virgin Mastertronic
Jug		1989	✓	✗	Microdeal
Jump Jet		1988	✓	✗	Anco Software
Jumping Jack Son		1990	✓	✗	Infogrames
Jumpster		1987	✓	✗	Peksoft
Jungle Book (The)		1988	✓	✗	Coktel Vision
Jungle Boy		1991	✓	✗	Byte Back
Jungle Jim		1991	✓	✗	Impressions
Jupiter Probe		1987	✓	✗	Microdeal
Jupiter's Masterdrive		1991	✓	✗	Ubi Soft
Just Another War in Space		1991	✓	✗	Azeroth Publishing
Kaiser		1987	✓	✗	Creative Computer Design (CCD)
Kalah ST		1992	✓	✗	Dragonware
Kamikaze		1990	✓	✗	Code Masters
Kampf um die Krone		1988	✓	✗	Lifetimes
Karate Kid Part II: The Computer Game, The		1987	✓	✗	Microdeal
Karateka		1988	✓	✗	Brøderbund Software
Karting Grand Prix		1988	✓	✗	Anco Software
Kayden Garth		1989	✓	✗	EAS
Kelly X		1989	✓	✗	Virgin Mastertronic
Kennedy Approach		1988	✓	✗	MicroProse
Kenny Dalglish Soccer Manager		1989	✓	✗	Zeppelin Games
Kenny Dalglish Soccer Match		1989	✓	✗	Impressions
Khalaan		1990	✓	✗	Chip
Khephren		1992	✓	✗	Pressimage
Kick Off		1989	✓	✗	Anco Software
Kick Off 2		1990	✓	✗	System 4
Kid Gloves		1990	✓	✗	Millennium
Kid Gloves II		1992	✓	✗	Millennium
Kids' Academy - Alvin's Puzzles		1992	✓	✗	Prisma Software
Killdozers		1988	✓	✗	Lankhor
Killerball		1991	✓	✗	Microïds
Killing Cloud (The)		1991	✓	✗	Image Works
Killing Game Show (The)		1991	✓	✗	Psygnosis
Killing Impact		1995	✓	✓	Digital Concept
Killing Machine		1992	✓	✗	Atlantis Software
Kinderama		1987	✓	✗	Unicorn Software
King of Chicago, The		1989	✓	✗	Cinemaware Corporation
King's Quest - Quest for the Crown	King's Quest I - Quest for the Crown	1987	✓	✗	Sierra On-Line
King's Quest II		1986	✓	✗	Sierra On-Line
King's Quest III		1987	✓	✗	Sierra On-Line
King's Quest IV		1989	✓	✗	Sierra On-Line
Kingmaker		1993	✓	✗	US Gold
Klax		1990	✓	✗	Domark
Knicker-Bockers		1987	✓	✗	TDC Distributors
Knight Force		1989	✓	✗	Titus
Knight Orc		1987	✓	✗	Rainbird
Knightmare (1991)		1991	✓	✗	Mindscape
Knightmare (Activision)		1988	✓	✗	Activision
Knights of the Sky		1992	✓	✗	MicroProse
Kosmic Krieg		1988	✓	✗	Alpha-tech Computers
Kristal, The		1990	✓	✗	Addictive Games
Krypton Egg		1989	✓	✗	Hitech Productions
Kult	Chamber of the Sci-Mutant Priestess	1989	✓	✗	Exxos
Kwik Snax		1991	✓	✗	Code Masters
Labyrinthe aux Cent Calculs (Le)		1989	✓	✗	Retz
Labyrinthe aux Mille Calculs (Le)		1989	✓	✗	Retz
Labyrinthe d'Anglomania I (Le)		1990	✓	✗	Retz
Labyrinthe d'Anglomania II (Le)		1990	✓	✗	Retz
Labyrinthe d'Errare		1989	✓	✗	Retz
Labyrinthe d'Orthophus (Le)		1989	✓	✗	Retz
Labyrinthe de la Reine des Ombres		1991	✓	✗	Retz
Labyrinthe de Lexicos (Le)		1990	✓	✗	Retz
Labyrinthe de Morphintax (Le)		1991	✓	✗	Retz
Labyrinthe des Pharaons (Le)			✓	✗	Retz
Lancaster		1989	✓	✗	Computer Rentals Limited (CRL)
Lancelot		1988	✓	✗	Datasoft
Landmine		1992	✓	✗	Atari Corporation
Lands of Havoc		1985	✓	✗	Antic Software
Las Vegas		1987	✓	✗	Anco Software
Laser Squad		1989	✓	✗	Blade Software
Last Duel		1989	✓	✗	US Gold
Last Ninja 2		1990	✓	✗	System 3 Software
Last Ninja III		1991	✓	✗	System 3 Software
Last Shoot-em Up! (The)		1988	✓	✗	Gollner Publishing
Last Trooper (The)		1989	✓	✗	Mastertronic
Leader Board Pro Golf Simulator		1986	✓	✗	Access Software
League Challenge		1990	✓	✗	Atlantis Software
Leander		1992	✓	✗	Psygnosis
Leather Goddesses of Phobos		1986	✓	✗	Infocom
Leatherneck		1988	✓	✗	Microdeal
Leavin' Teramis		1990	✓	✗	Grandslam Entertainment
LED Storm		1988	✓	✗	US Gold
Lee Enfield - An Amazon Adventure	Bob Morane - Jungle	1987	✓	✗	Infogrames
Lee Enfield - Space Ace	Bob Moran - Science Fiction	1988	✓	✗	Infogrames
Lee Enfield - The Tournament of Death	Bob Morane - Chevalerie, Bob Moran - Rittertum	1988	✓	✗	Infogrames
Leeds United Champions!		1992	✓	✗	CDS Software
Legend (Actual Screenshots)		1989	✓	✗	Computer Rentals Limited (CRL)
Legend (Mindscape)		1992	✓	✗	Mindscape
Legend of Djel		1989	✓	✗	System 4
Legend of Faerghail		1990	✓	✗	reLINE Software
Legend of the Lost		1990	✓	✗	Impressions
Legend of the Sword		1988	✓	✗	Rainbird
Légende des Dynasties (La)		1991	✓	✗	Salia Software
Legends of Valour		1993	✓	✗	US Gold
Leisure Suit Larry		1987	✓	✗	Sierra On-Line
Leisure Suit Larry 2		1989	✓	✗	Sierra On-Line
Leisure Suit Larry 3		1990	✓	✗	Sierra On-Line
Lemmings		1991	✓	✗	Psygnosis
Lemmings 2: The Tribes		1993	✓	✗	Psygnosis
Leonardo		1989	✓	✗	Starbyte
Let's Play Shangai		1994	✗	✓	OXO Concept
Lethal Weapon		1993	✓	✗	Ocean Software
Lethal Xcess		1991	✓	✗	Eclipse Software
Lettrix			✓	✗	Software 2000
Leviathan		1987	✓	✗	English Software Company
Liberator		1987	✓	✗	TDC Distributors
Licence to Kill	Permis de Tuer	1989	✓	✗	Domark
Life & Death		1991	✓	✗	Software Toolworks (The)
Lifeboat		1991	✓	✗	Zenobi Software
Lift (The)		1989	✓	✗	Cedic Nathan / Nathan Logiciels
Light Corridor, The		1990	✓	✗	Infogrames
Lin Wu's Challenge		1990	✓	✗	Lasersoft
Line of Fire		1991	✓	✗	US Gold
Little Computer People		1986	✓	✗	Activision
Little Puff		1989	✓	✗	Code Masters
Little Puff in Dragonland		1989	✓	✗	Code Masters
Live and Let Die	Vivre et Laisser Mourir	1988	✓	✗	Domark
Liverpool - The Computer Game		1992	✓	✗	Grandslam Entertainment
Living Jigsaw		1991	✓	✗	Miles Computing
Livingstone II		1990	✓	✗	Opera Soft
Livingstone, I Presume?		1987	✓	✗	Alligata Software
Llamazap		1993	✗	✓	Atari Corporation
Lock-On		1988	✓	✗	Data East
Locomotion (Byte Back)		1991	✓	✗	Byte Back
Locomotion (Kingsoft)		1992	✓	✗	Kingsoft
Lode Runner		1989	✓	✗	Brøderbund Software
Logical		1991	✓	✗	Rainbow Arts
Logo			✓	✗	Starbyte
Lombard RAC Rally		1988	✓	✗	Mandarin Software
Loom		1990	✓	✗	Lucasfilm Games
Loopz		1990	✓	✗	Audiogenic Software Ltd. (ASL)
Lords of Chaos		1991	✓	✗	Blade Software
Lords of Conquest		1988	✓	✗	Electronic Arts
Lords of Doom		1991	✓	✗	Starbyte
Lorna		1990	✓	✗	Topo Soft
Lost Dutchman Mine		1990	✓	✗	Innerprise Software
Lost Kingdom of Zkul (The)		1985	✓	✗	Talent Computer Systems
Lost Patrol (The)		1990	✓	✗	Ocean Software
Lotus Esprit Turbo Challenge		1990	✓	✗	Gremlin Graphics
Lotus III: The Ultimate Challenge		1992	✓	✗	Gremlin Graphics
Lotus Turbo Challenge 2		1991	✓	✗	Gremlin Graphics
Lucky Luke - Nitroglycérine / Nitroglyzerin		1987	✓	✗	Coktel Vision
Lure of the Temptress		1992	✓	✗	Virgin Games
Lurking Horror, The		1987	✓	✗	Infocom
Luxor		1988	✓	✗	Software Horizons Ltd.
M1 Tank Platoon		1990	✓	✗	MicroProse
Macadam Bumper	Pinball Wizard	1987	✓	✗	Ère Informatique
Mach III		1987	✓	✗	Loriciel
Mad Flunky		1989	✓	✗	Alternative Software
Mad Professor Mariarti		1990	✓	✗	Krisalis
Mad Show		1988	✓	✗	Silmarils
Mafdet and the Book of the Dead		1988	✓	✗	Software Horizons Ltd.
Magazin (Das)		1990	✓	✗	Ariolasoft
Magic Alpha		1988	✓	✗	Pressimage
Magic Bille		1988	✓	✗	Pressimage
Magic Boy		1993	✓	✗	Empire Software
Magic Cases		1988	✓	✗	Pressimage
Magic Fly		1990	✓	✗	Electronic Arts
Magic Lines		1990	✓	✗	Thalion
Magic Pockets		1991	✓	✗	Renegade
Magic Shop (The)		1990	✓	✗	Zenobi Software
Magical Anagrams		1988	✓	✗	Atari Corporation
Magical Math I		1988	✓	✗	Atari Corporation
Magical Math II		1988	✓	✗	Atari Corporation
Magical Math III		1988	✓	✗	Atari Corporation
Magician		1990	✓	✗	Loriciel
Magicland Dizzy		1992	✓	✗	Code Masters
Mah-Jong Solitaire		1992	✓	✗	Cali-Co Superior Software
Main Battle Tank North Germany		1990	✓	✗	Simulations Canada
Major Motion		1985	✓	✗	MichTron
Makin' Whoopee!		1988	✓	✗	IB Computers
Man from the Council			✓	✗	Tynesoft
Manager Test		1992	✓	✗	LetDisk
Manchester United		1990	✓	✗	Krisalis
Manchester United Europe		1991	✓	✗	Krisalis
Mangemot		1991	✓	✗	VTA
Manhunter 2: San Francisco		1989	✓	✗	Sierra On-Line
Manhunter: New York		1988	✓	✗	Sierra On-Line
Maniac Mansion		1989	✓	✗	Lucasfilm Games
Maniax		1988	✓	✗	Anco Software
Manix		1990	✓	✗	Millennium
Manoir du Comte Frozarda (Le)		1988	✓	✗	MBC
Marble Madness		1987	✓	✗	Electronic Arts
Maria's Christmas Box		1988	✓	✗	Anco Software
Marque Jaune (La)		1988	✓	✗	Cobra Soft
Mascotte (La)		1988	✓	✗	Coktel Vision
Masque+		1987	✓	✗	Ubi Soft
Massacre dans la 520ème Dimension		1987	✓	✗	Loriciel
Masterblazer		1991	✓	✗	Rainbow Arts
Masters of the Universe: The Movie		1988	✓	✗	Gremlin Graphics
Mata Hari		1988	✓	✗	Loriciel
Match of the Day		1992	✓	✗	Zeppelin Games
Maternelle 4/5 Ans		1989	✓	✗	CMD
Math Blaster Plus!		1989	✓	✗	Davidson
Math Wizard		1987	✓	✗	Unicorn Software
Maths Adventure		1991	✓	✗	Kosmos Software
Maths Dragons		1990	✓	✗	Coombe Valley Software
Matrix Marauders		1990	✓	✗	Psygnosis
Maupiti Island		1991	✓	✗	Lankhor
Maxi Bourse International			✓	✗	Cobra Soft
Mayday Squad		1989	✓	✗	Tynesoft
McDonald Land		1993	✓	✗	Virgin Mastertronic
Mean 18		1986	✓	✗	Accolade
Mean Machine		1991	✓	✗	Code Masters
Mean Streets		1990	✓	✗	Access Software
Mec Love Story		1988	✓	✗	Pressimage
Mega Lo Mania		1991	✓	✗	Image Works
Mega Mines		1997	✓	✗	999 Software
Mega Phoenix		1991	✓	✗	Dinamic
Mega Twins		1991	✓	✗	US Gold
MegaTraveller - The Zhodani Conspiracy		1991	✓	✗	Empire Software
Mémorise			✓	✗	Carraz
Memorix		1988	✓	✗	Pressimage
Memory Master		1988	✓	✗	Atari Corporation
Memory Master II		1988	✓	✗	Atari Corporation
Menace		1988	✓	✗	Psygnosis
Mercenary - Escape from Targ		1986	✓	✗	Datasoft
Mercenary III - The Dion Crisis		1991	✓	✗	Novagen Software (UK)
Merchant Colony		1991	✓	✗	Impressions
Mercs		1991	✓	✗	US Gold
Metal Masters		1990	✓	✗	Infogrames
Metal Mutant		1991	✓	✗	Silmarils
Metro-Cross		1987	✓	✗	US Gold
Metropolis		1987	✓	✗	Eidersoft
Meurtres en Série		1988	✓	✗	Cobra Soft
Mewilo		1988	✓	✗	Coktel Vision
MGT (Magnetic Tank)		1986	✓	✗	Loriciel
Miami Vice		1989	✓	✗	Capstone
Mickey et la Machine à Mots Croisés		1991	✓	✗	Disney Software
Mickey Mouse - The Computer Game		1988	✓	✗	Gremlin Graphics
Mickey's Runaway Zoo	Mickey et le Zoo en Folie, Micky und der Verrückte Zoo, Mickey - La Fuga del Zoo, Zoo di Topolino in Liberta (Lo)	1992	✓	✗	Disney Software
Micro League Baseball		1987	✓	✗	Micro League Sports Association
Micro League Wrestling		1987	✓	✗	Micro League Sports Association
Micro Scrabble			✓	✗	Leisure Genius
Microleague Baseball II		1990	✓	✗	Micro League Sports Association
MicroProse Golf		1991	✓	✗	MicroProse
Microprose Soccer	Keith Van Eron's Pro Soccer	1989	✓	✗	MicroProse
MIDI Maze		1987	✓	✗	Hybrid Arts
Midnight Resistance		1990	✓	✗	Ocean Software
Midway Battles		1987	✓	✗	TDC Distributors
Midwinter		1990	✓	✗	Rainbird
Midwinter II - Flames of Freedom		1991	✓	✗	Rainbird
MIG-29 - Fulcrum		1991	✓	✗	Domark
MIG-29 - Soviet Fighter		1990	✓	✗	Code Masters
MIG-29M Super Fulcrum		1991	✓	✗	Domark
Mighty Bombjack		1991	✓	✗	Elite
Mike Read's Computer Pop Quiz		1989	✓	✗	Elite
Millennium 2.2		1989	✓	✗	Electric Dreams
Mind Forever Voyaging, A		1985	✓	✗	Infocom
Mindbender		1989	✓	✗	Gremlin Graphics
Mindfighter		1988	✓	✗	Activision
Mindshadow		1986	✓	✗	Activision
Mindwheel		1985	✓	✗	Brøderbund Software
Mines Of Lithiad		1991	✓	✗	Zenobi Software
Mini Golf	Hole-in-One Miniature Golf	1989	✓	✗	Magic Bytes
Minos		1989	✓	✗	Turtle Byte
Minos (Pressimage)		1987	✓	✗	Pressimage
Missile Command		1987	✓	✗	Atari Corporation
Missile Command 2		1987	✓	✗	Atari Corporation
Missing:... One Droid		1986	✓	✗	Ariolasoft
Mission		1987	✓	✗	Loriciel
Mission Elevator		1987	✓	✗	Softgold
Mission Genocide		1988	✓	✗	Firebird (UK)
Mission Mouse		1985	✓	✗	Paradox
Missions en Rafale		1988	✓	✗	France Image Logiciel (FIL)
Mix and Match		1991	✓	✗	Lander Software
Mixed Up Mother Goose		1987	✓	✗	Sierra On-Line
Moebius		1987	✓	✗	Origin Systems
Monkey Business		1985	✓	✗	Other Valley Software
Monopoly (Pressimage)			✓	✗	Pressimage
Monster Business		1991	✓	✗	Eclipse Software
Monty Python's Flying Circus		1990	✓	✗	MCM
Moon Blaster		1990	✓	✗	Loriciel
Moon Letters		1991	✓	✗	Shoestring Software
Moon Patrol		1987	✓	✗	Atari Corporation
Moonbase		1988	✓	✗	Atari Corporation
Moonfall		1991	✓	✗	21st Century Entertainment
Moonmist		1986	✓	✗	Infocom
Moonshine Racers		1991	✓	✗	Millennium
Moonspeeder		1994	✗	✓	COMPO Software
Moonwalker - The Computer Game		1989	✓	✗	US Gold
Mortville Manor	Manoir de Mortevielle (Le)	1988	✓	✗	Lankhor
Moscow Campaign - Typhoon & White Storm 30 Aug 1941-13 Feb 1942		1987	✓	✗	Simulations Canada
Mot		1989	✓	✗	Opera Soft
Motor Massacre	Road Raider	1988	✓	✗	Gremlin Graphics
Motorbike Madness		1988	✓	✗	Mastertronic
Motörhead		1993	✓	✗	Virgin Mastertronic
Mots Croisés			✓	✗	Pressimage
Mouse Trap	Mouse Quest	1987	✓	✗	Micro-Value
Mr. Do! Run Run		1990	✓	✗	Electrocoin
Mr. Heli		1989	✓	✗	Firebird (UK)
Mudpies		1985	✓	✗	MichTron
Multi Player Soccer Manager		1991	✓	✗	D & H Games
Multibriques		1994	✗	✓	Parx
Munsters (The)		1988	✓	✗	Alternative Software
Murder		1990	✓	✗	US Gold
Murder on the Atlantic		1988	✓	✗	Intracorp, Inc.
Murders in Space		1990	✓	✗	Infogrames
Murders in Venice	Meurtres à Venise	1989	✓	✗	Cobra Soft
Mutant			✓	✗	River Software
Muzzy		1993	✓	✗	Enigma Software Developments
Mystery of the Mummy		1989	✓	✗	Rainbow Arts
Mystical		1990	✓	✗	Infogrames
Napoleon I - The Campaigns 1805 -1814		1991	✓	✗	Internecine
NARC		1991	✓	✗	Ocean Software
Narco Police		1991	✓	✗	Dinamic
Navy Moves		1988	✓	✗	Dinamic
Navy Seals		1991	✓	✗	Ocean Software
Nebulus	Tower Toppler	1988	✓	✗	Hewson
Nécromancien (Le)		1987	✓	✗	Ubi Soft
Necron - Aptor Quest		1989	✓	✗	16/32 Diffusion
Neighbours		1990	✓	✗	Zeppelin Games
Nervana Quest 1&2		1989	✓	✗	StarSoft Development Laboratories
Nervana Quest 3&4		1989	✓	✗	StarSoft Development Laboratories
Netherworld		1988	✓	✗	Hewson
Never Mind		1990	✓	✗	Psygnosis
New Arrival			✓	✗	Zenobi Software
NewZealand Story, The		1989	✓	✗	Ocean Software
Nicky Boom		1992	✓	✗	Microïds
Nicky II		1993	✓	✗	Microïds
Nigel Mansell's Grand Prix		1988	✓	✗	Martech
Nigel Mansell's World Championship		1993	✓	✗	Gremlin Graphics
Night Hunter		1988	✓	✗	Ubi Soft
Night Shift		1991	✓	✗	Lucasfilm Games
Nightbreed - The Action Game		1990	✓	✗	Ocean Software
Nightbreed: The Interactive Movie		1990	✓	✗	Ocean Software
Nightdawn		1989	✓	✗	Magic Bytes
Nightwalk		1988	✓	✗	Alternative Software
Nine Princes in Amber		1985	✓	✗	Audiogenic
Ninja Mission		1987	✓	✗	Mastertronic
Ninja Rabbits		1991	✓	✗	Micro-Value
Ninja Remix		1990	✓	✗	System 3 Software
Ninja Spirit		1990	✓	✗	Activision
Ninja Warriors		1989	✓	✗	Virgin Mastertronic
Nitro		1990	✓	✗	Psygnosis
Nitro Boost Challenge	Super Stuntman	1989	✓	✗	Code Masters
No Buddies Land		1991	✓	✗	Loriciel
No Excuses		1988	✓	✗	Arcana
No Exit		1990	✓	✗	Coktel Vision
No Second Prize		1993	✓	✓	Thalion
Noddy's Playtime		1992	✓	✗	Jumping Bean Co. (The)
Nord and Bert couldn't Make Head or Tail of It		1988	✓	✗	Infocom
North & South		1989	✓	✗	Data East
North Star		1988	✓	✗	Gremlin Graphics
Not a Penny More, Not a Penny Less		1987	✓	✗	Domark
Numero 10		1989	✓	✗	France Image Logiciel (FIL)
Obitus		1991	✓	✗	Psygnosis
Obliterator		1988	✓	✗	Psygnosis
Obsession		1994	✓	✗	ChroMAGIC
Off Shore Warrior		1988	✓	✗	Titus
Official Everton FC Intelligensia (The)		1990	✓	✗	Amfas
Ogre		1987	✓	✗	Origin Systems
Oh No! More Lemmings		1991	✓	✗	Psygnosis
Oids		1987	✓	✗	Faster than Light (FTL)
Oilmania		1991	✓	✗	Dencker-Barile
Oliver & Company		1989	✓	✗	Coktel Vision
Olympus		1990	✓	✗	Olympian Software
Omar Sharif's Bridge		1992	✓	✗	Oxford Softworks
Omega		1989	✓	✗	Origin Systems
Omnicron Conspiracy		1990	✓	✗	Image Works
On the Road		1990	✓	✗	Lifetimes
Once upon a Time	Il Était une Fois		✓	✗	Carraz
Once upon a Time - Abracadabra		1991	✓	✗	Coktel Vision
Once upon a Time - Baba Yaga		1991	✓	✗	Coktel Vision
Once upon a Time - Le Petit Chaperon Rouge	Once upon a Time - Caperucita Roja	1991	✓	✗	Coktel Vision
One Step Beyond		1993	✓	✗	Ocean Software
Onslaught		1989	✓	✗	Hewson
Oo-Topos		1986	✓	✗	Polarware, Inc.
Ooze		1988	✓	✗	Ariolasoft
Operation Harrier		1990	✓	✗	US Gold
Operation Hongkong		1988	✓	✗	HGSS-Productions
Operation Hormuz		1989	✓	✗	Alternative Software
Operation Neptune	Bob Morane - Océans, Project Neptune	1989	✓	✗	Infogrames
Operation Skuum		1996	✗	✓	Logitron
Operation Stealth		1990	✓	✗	Delphine Software
Operation Thunderbolt		1990	✓	✗	Ocean Software
Operation Wolf		1988	✓	✗	Ocean Software
Operation: Cleanstreets	Manhattan Dealers	1989	✓	✗	Brøderbund Software
Orbit 2000		1991	✓	✗	Byte Back
Orbital Destroyer		1991	✓	✗	Trojan Software
Orbiter		1988	✓	✗	Spectrum Holobyte
Oriental Games		1990	✓	✗	MicroProse
Orion's Run		1987	✓	✗	Beery's Bit
Ork		1992	✓	✗	Psygnosis
Othello Killer		1991	✓	✗	Ubi Soft
Out Board		1990	✓	✗	Loriciel
Out Run		1988	✓	✗	US Gold
Out Run Europa		1991	✓	✗	US Gold
Outcast	Renegade (Mastertronic)	1987	✓	✗	Mastertronic
Outrider		1995	✓	✗	Top Byte Software
Outzone		1991	✓	✗	Lankhor
Overlander		1988	✓	✗	Elite
Overlord		1988	✓	✗	Cases Computer Simulations Ltd.
Oxxonian		1989	✓	✗	Rainbow Arts
Oxyd 2		1991	✓	✗	Dongleware
Oxyd Magnum!		1993	✓	✗	Dongleware
P-47 Thunderbolt		1989	✓	✗	Firebird (UK)
Pac-Land		1989	✓	✗	Quicksilva
Pac-Mania		1988	✓	✗	Grandslam Entertainment
Pacific Islands		1992	✓	✗	Empire Software
Paladin		1988	✓	✗	Omnitrend Software
Paladin II		1992	✓	✗	Impressions
Pandora		1988	✓	✗	Firebird (UK)
Pang		1990	✓	✗	Ocean Software
Panza Kick Boxing		1990	✓	✗	Loriciel
Paperboy		1989	✓	✗	Elite
Paradroid 90		1990	✓	✗	Hewson
Paragliding		1991	✓	✗	Loriciel
Parasol Stars		1992	✓	✗	Ocean Software
Paris Dakar 1990		1990	✓	✗	System 4
Paris-Dakar		1988	✓	✗	Erbe Software
Passengers on the Wind	Passagers du Vent (Les), Pasajeros del Viento (Los)	1986	✓	✗	Infogrames
Passengers on the Wind II	Passagers du Vent II (Les)	1988	✓	✗	Infogrames
Passing Shot		1989	✓	✗	Image Works
Patrician (The)	Patrizer (Der)	1993	✓	✗	Ascon
Pawn, The		1986	✓	✗	Firebird (USA)
Pegasus		1991	✓	✗	Gremlin Graphics
Peggammon		1986	✓	✗	Artworx
Penguin Full Version		1989	✓	✗	B.Ware
Pengy		1987	✓	✗	Red Rat Software
Pepe's Garden		1991	✓	✗	Prisma Software
Pepsi Challenge - Mad Mix Game		1988	✓	✗	US Gold
Perry Mason - The Case of the Mandarin Murder		1986	✓	✗	Telarium
Persée et Andromède			✓	✗	Coktel Vision
Persian Gulf Inferno (The)	North Sea Inferno	1990	✓	✗	Magic Bytes
Personal Nightmare		1989	✓	✗	Tynesoft
Peter Pan		1988	✓	✗	Coktel Vision
Pexeso		1992	✓	✗	JRC
Phantasie		1986	✓	✗	Strategic Simulations, Inc.
Phantasie II		1987	✓	✗	Strategic Simulations, Inc.
Phantasie III - The Wrath of Nikademus		1987	✓	✗	Strategic Simulations, Inc.
Phantasm		1988	✓	✗	Exocet Software
Pharaoh III		1989	✓	✗	Supernova Software
Phobia		1989	✓	✗	Image Works
Phoenix		1987	✓	✗	Ère Informatique
Photon Storm		1990	✓	✗	Atari (UK)
Pick'n Pile		1990	✓	✗	Ubi Soft
Picsou - Chasseur de Trésor	Picsou - Cazador del Tesoro, Joakim Von Anka Skattsökaren	1989	✓	✗	Coktel Vision
Pictionary		1989	✓	✗	Brøderbund Software
Pinball Dreams		1995	✗	✓	21st Century Entertainment
Pinball Factory		1986	✓	✗	MichTron
Pinball Magic		1989	✓	✗	Loriciel
Ping 2000		1995	✗	✓	Holland Game Design
Pink Panther	Panthère Rose (La)	1988	✓	✗	Magic Bytes
Pipe Dream	Pipe Mania	1990	✓	✗	Lucasfilm Games
Pirates of the Barbary Coast		1987	✓	✗	Cascade Games Ltd.
Pirates!		1989	✓	✗	MicroProse
Pit-Fighter		1991	✓	✗	Domark
Pixie & Dixie - Featuring Mr. Jinks		1993	✓	✗	Alternative Software
PKS-Dame		1986	✓	✗	Pahlen & Krauss Software (PKS)
Plan 9 from Outer Space		1992	✓	✗	Gremlin Graphics
Planet of Lust		1989	✓	✗	Free Spirit Software, Inc.
Planetfall		1985	✓	✗	Infocom
Platonix		1995	✗	✓	Digital Vision, Inc.
Platoon		1988	✓	✗	Data East
Playbac		1987	✓	✗	Microïds
Player Manager		1990	✓	✗	Anco Software
Playhouse Strip Poker		1987	✓	✗	Aackosoft
Plotting		1990	✓	✗	Ocean Software
Plundered Hearts		1987	✓	✗	Infocom
Plutos		1987	✓	✗	Micro-Value
Police Quest II: The Vengeance		1988	✓	✗	Sierra On-Line
Police Quest: In Pursuit of the Death Angel		1987	✓	✗	Sierra On-Line
Pool	Pub Pool	1988	✓	✗	Mastertronic
Pop Up	Bumpy	1991	✓	✗	Infogrames
Popeye II		1992	✓	✗	Alternative Software
Populous		1989	✓	✗	Electronic Arts
Populous II: Trials of the Olympian Gods		1992	✓	✗	Electronic Arts
Portes du Temps (Les)		1989	✓	✗	16/32 Diffusion
Postman Pat		1989	✓	✗	Alternative Software
Postman Pat III		1992	✓	✗	Alternative Software
Pothole Pete		1988	✓	✗	Atlantis Software
Potsworth & Co		1992	✓	✗	Hi-Tec Premier Software
Poursuite de Carmen Sandiego (À la)		1991	✓	✗	Brøderbund Software
Power Drift		1989	✓	✗	Activision
Power Struggle		1988	✓	✗	PSS
Power Up		1997	✓	✗	Empty Head
Power Up Plus		1998	✓	✗	Empty Head
Powerdrome		1988	✓	✗	Electronic Arts
Powermonger		1991	✓	✗	Electronic Arts
Powermonger - World War I Edition		1992	✓	✗	Electronic Arts
Powerplay - The Game of the Gods		1988	✓	✗	Arcana
Predator		1988	✓	✗	Activision
Predator 2		1991	✓	✗	Image Works
Prehistorik		1991	✓	✗	Titus
Premier Manager		1992	✓	✗	Gremlin Graphics
Premier Manager II		1994	✓	✗	Gremlin Graphics
President Elect		1987	✓	✗	Strategic Simulations, Inc.
President Is Missing (The)		1988	✓	✗	Cosmi
Prime Time		1987	✓	✗	First Row Software Publishing
Prince		1989	✓	✗	Atari (UK)
Prince of Persia		1990	✓	✗	Brøderbund Software
Prison		1989	✓	✗	Actionware
Pro Boxing Simulator		1991	✓	✗	Code Masters
Pro Powerboat Simulator		1990	✓	✗	Code Masters
Pro Soccer 2190		1990	✓	✗	Vulture Publishing
Pro Tennis Simulator		1990	✓	✗	Code Masters
Pro Tennis Tour	Great Courts	1989	✓	✗	Ubi Soft
Pro Tennis Tour 2	Great Courts II	1991	✓	✗	Ubi Soft
Professional Football Masters 3	Professional Football Masters 4.07		✓	✗	Esp Software
Professor Craps		1986	✓	✗	Scorpio Systems International Inc
ProFlight		1990	✓	✗	HiSoft
Prohibition		1987	✓	✗	Infogrames
Project Terra		1991	✓	✗	Softwave
Projectyle		1990	✓	✗	Electronic Arts
Projekt Prometheus			✓	✗	Bomico
Prophecy I - The Viking Child		1990	✓	✗	Wired
Protector		1990	✓	✗	Virgin Mastertronic
Psion Chess		1986	✓	✗	Psion Ltd.
Psyborg		1992	✓	✗	Loriciel
Psycho		1989	✓	✗	Box Office
Pub Trivia Simulator		1990	✓	✗	Code Masters
Puffy's Saga		1988	✓	✗	Ubi Soft
Punisher (The)		1990	✓	✗	Edge (The)
Purple Saturn Day		1989	✓	✗	Exxos
Pursuit to Earth (The)		1989	✓	✗	Exocet Software
Pushover		1992	✓	✗	Ocean Software
Puzzle Book Vol.1		1990	✓	✗	Soft Stuff
Puzzle Book Vol.2		1990	✓	✗	Soft Stuff
Puzzles (Pressimage)		1987	✓	✗	Pressimage
Puzznic		1990	✓	✗	Ocean Software
Pyramax		1990	✓	✗	Atari (UK)
Pyramide non Numérique			✓	✗	Synergie & Communications
Pyramino		1987	✓	✗	Pressimage
Q-Ball		1986	✓	✗	English Software Company
Qatbol			✓	✗	Ariolasoft
Qin		1987	✓	✗	Ère Informatique
Quadralien		1988	✓	✗	Logotron
Quadrel		1991	✓	✗	Loriciel
Quartz		1989	✓	✗	Firebird (UK)
Quasar		1986	✓	✗	Loriciel
Quest		1987	✓	✗	Pyramide
Quest for the Time-Bird	Auf der Suche nach dem Vogel der Zeit, Quête de l'Oiseau du Temps (La)	1989	✓	✗	Infogrames
Question of Sport, A		1990	✓	✗	Encore
Questprobe II - Spider-man		1986	✓	✗	Adventure International
Questprobe III - Fantastic Four Chapter I	Questprobe Featuring The Human Torch And The Thing	1986	✓	✗	Adventure International
Questron II		1989	✓	✗	Strategic Simulations, Inc.
Quink		1985	✓	✗	Mindscape
Quiwi		1986	✓	✗	Kingsoft
Quiz Master		1988	✓	✗	ASM
Quiz Wizard		1987	✓	✗	Astra Systems Software
Quizam!		1986	✓	✗	Interstel Corporation
R-Type		1988	✓	✗	Electric Dreams
R-Type 2		1991	✓	✗	Activision
R/C Aerochopper		1991	✓	✗	Ambrosia Microcomputer
Race Drivin'		1992	✓	✗	Domark
Racing Game (The)			✓	✗	Tanglewood Software
Radical Race		1996	✗	✓	Logitron
Radio Controlled Racer		1991	✓	✗	Byte Back
Raffles	Devon Aire in the Hidden Diamond Caper	1989	✓	✗	Edge (The)
Raiders		1990	✓	✗	Lankhor
Railroad Tycoon		1991	✓	✗	MicroProse
Rainbow Islands		1990	✓	✗	Ocean Software
Rainbow Warrior		1989	✓	✗	MicroProse
Rally Cross Challenge		1989	✓	✗	Anco Software
Rambo III		1989	✓	✗	Ocean Software
Rampage		1988	✓	✗	Activision
Rampart		1992	✓	✗	Domark
Rana Rama		1987	✓	✗	Hewson
Ranx		1990	✓	✗	Ubi Soft
RBI Baseball II		1991	✓	✗	Domark
Reach for the Skies		1993	✓	✗	Virgin Games
Read & Rhyme		1985	✓	✗	Unicorn Software
Real Ghostbusters, The		1989	✓	✗	Activision
Realistic Video Poker		1989	✓	✗	Micro Creations
Realm of the Trolls	Down at the Trolls	1988	✓	✗	US Gold
Realms		1992	✓	✗	Virgin Mastertronic
Reasoning with Trolls		1991	✓	✗	Coombe Valley Software
Rebellion		1992	✓	✗	Players
Reconnais-Moi			✓	✗	Carraz
Recovery		1990	✓	✗	New Deal Productions
Red Ace		1988	✓	✗	Red Rat Software
Red Alert		1986	✓	✗	Antic Software
Red Heat		1989	✓	✗	Ocean Software
Red Lightning		1989	✓	✗	Strategic Simulations, Inc.
Red Storm Rising		1989	✓	✗	MicroProse
Reederei		1990	✓	✗	Ariolasoft
Reich (Das)		1989	✓	✗	New's Software Düsseldorf
Renaissance I	Classic 4	1990	✓	✗	Impressions
Renegade		1989	✓	✗	Ocean Software
Resolution 101		1990	✓	✗	Millennium
Retorno de Mazinger Zeta (El)		1991	✓	✗	Wizard Software (The)
Retrouve L'Histoire		1990	✓	✗	Carraz
Return to Genesis		1988	✓	✗	Firebird (UK)
Revelation		1991	✓	✗	Krisalis
Revenge of the Mutant Camels II		1988	✓	✗	Mastertronic
Reversi Brain		1988	✓	✗	Pressimage
Rick Dangerous		1989	✓	✗	Firebird (UK)
Rick Dangerous 2		1990	✓	✗	MCM
Rings of Medusa		1989	✓	✗	Starbyte
Rings of Medusa II - The Return of Medusa		1991	✓	✗	Starbyte
Rings of Zilfin		1987	✓	✗	Strategic Simulations, Inc.
Ringside		1989	✓	✗	EAS
Ripoux (Les)		1987	✓	✗	Cobra Soft
Risk		1990	✓	✗	Virgin Mastertronic
Riskant!		1992	✓	✗	Gametek
Risky Woods		1993	✓	✗	Electronic Arts
Ritter		1990	✓	✗	Ariolasoft
Road Riot 4WD		1993	✗	✓	Atari Corporation
Road Runner		1987	✓	✗	Mindscape
RoadBlasters		1989	✓	✗	US Gold
Roadwar 2000		1987	✓	✗	Strategic Simulations, Inc.
Roadwar Europa		1987	✓	✗	Strategic Simulations, Inc.
Roadwars		1988	✓	✗	Arcadia Systems
Robbo		1994	✓	✗	LK Avalon
Robin Hood - Legend Quest		1993	✓	✗	Code Masters
Robin Smith's International Cricket		1991	✓	✗	Challenge Software
Robinson's Requiem		1994	✓	✓	Silmarils
RoboCop		1989	✓	✗	Ocean Software
RoboCop 2		1991	✓	✗	Ocean Software
Robocop III		1992	✓	✗	Ocean Software
Robot Attack		1991	✓	✗	Shoestring Software
Robotron: 2084		1987	✓	✗	Atari Corporation
Robozone		1991	✓	✗	Image Works
Rock 'n' Roll		1990	✓	✗	Rainbow Arts
Rock Star		1990	✓	✗	Infomédia
Rock Star Ate My Hamster		1990	✓	✗	Code Masters
Rock'n Roll Clams		1994	✓	✗	Caspian Software
Rocket Racer			✓	✗	DP
Rocket Ranger		1989	✓	✗	Cinemaware Corporation
Rockford		1988	✓	✗	Melbourne House
Rod Land		1991	✓	✗	Sales Curve (The)
Rody & Mastico		1988	✓	✗	Lankhor
Rody & Mastico II		1990	✓	✗	Lankhor
Rody & Mastico III		1990	✓	✗	Lankhor
Rody & Mastico IV - Rody Noël		1990	✓	✗	Lankhor
Rody & Mastico V		1991	✓	✗	Lankhor
Rody & Mastico VI		1991	✓	✗	Lankhor
Rogue		1986	✓	✗	Epyx
Rogue Trooper		1990	✓	✗	Krisalis
Roll-Out		1989	✓	✗	EAS
Roller Coaster Rumbler		1989	✓	✗	Tynesoft
Rolling Ronny		1991	✓	✗	Starbyte
Rolling Thunder		1988	✓	✗	US Gold
Roman Policier (Le)			✓	✗	Carraz
Rommel at Gazala - Battles for Torbuk 26 May-27 June 1942		1988	✓	✗	Simulations Canada
Rorke's Drift		1990	✓	✗	Impressions
Rosemary Raccoon's Strip Game			✓	✗	Pressimage
Rotor		1990	✓	✗	Arcana
Rotox		1990	✓	✗	US Gold
Round the Bend!		1991	✓	✗	Zeppelin Games
Roy of the Rovers		1989	✓	✗	Gremlin Graphics
Rubicon		1992	✓	✗	21st Century Entertainment
Ruff and Reddy in the Space Adventure		1990	✓	✗	Hi-Tec Software
Rugby - The World Cup		1991	✓	✗	Domark
Rugby Coach		1991	✓	✗	D & H Games
Rugby League Boss		1988	✓	✗	Crysys
Rugby League Coach		1994	✓	✗	Audiogenic Software Ltd. (ASL)
Run the Gauntlet		1989	✓	✗	Ocean Software
Rune		1990	✓	✗	Pressimage
Running		1997	✗	✓	16/32 Systems
Running Man, The		1989	✓	✗	Grandslam Entertainment
RVF Honda		1989	✓	✗	MCM
Sabre Team		1992	✓	✗	Krisalis
Sacados			✓	✗	Carraz
Safari Guns	On Safari	1989	✓	✗	New Deal Productions
Saga 13: Sorcerer of Claymorgue Castle			✓	✗	Adventure International
Saint & Greavsie		1989	✓	✗	Grandslam Entertainment
Saint Dragon		1990	✓	✗	Sales Curve (The)
Salmo		1990	✓	✗	Myriad
Samurai - The Way of the Warrior		1992	✓	✗	Impressions
Santa Paravia and Fiumaccio		1988	✓	✗	StarSoft Development Laboratories
Sapiens		1987	✓	✗	Loriciel
Sarakon		1991	✓	✗	Leisure Genius
Sargon III		1988	✓	✗	Hayden Software
SAS Combat Simulator		1989	✓	✗	Code Masters
Sat.1 Bingo		1992	✓	✗	PCSL Software GmbH
Satan		1990	✓	✗	Dinamic
Savage		1989	✓	✗	Firebird (UK)
Scapeghost		1989	✓	✗	Level 9 Computing
Scenario - Theatre of War			✓	✗	Starbyte
Scooby-Doo and Scrappy-Doo		1991	✓	✗	Hi-Tec Software
Scoop - Junior			✓	✗	Génération 5
Scoop - Sénior			✓	✗	Génération 5
Scrabble		1993	✓	✗	US Gold
Scramble Spirits		1990	✓	✗	Grandslam Entertainment
Screaming Wings		1987	✓	✗	Red Rat Software
Scruples - A Question of		1987	✓	✗	Leisure Genius
SDI		1988	✓	✗	Activision
SDI - Strategic Defence Initiative		1987	✓	✗	Cinemaware Corporation
Seastalker		1985	✓	✗	Infocom
Secession		1991	✓	✗	Computer Verlag
Second World (The)		1990	✓	✗	Magic Bytes
Seconds Out		1988	✓	✗	Tynesoft
Secret Cave (The)		1988	✓	✗	Tronic Verlag
Secret England - 4ème/3ème			✓	✗	Génération 5
Secret England - 6e/5e		1991	✓	✗	Génération 5
Secret of Steel (The)		1988	✓	✗	Red Rat Software
Sensible Soccer	Sensible Soccer European Champions - 1992/3 Season Edition, International Sensible Soccer	1992	✓	✗	Mindscape
Sentinel	The Sentry	1987	✓	✗	Firebird (UK)
Seventh Fleet - Modern Naval Combat in the Pacific Ocean		1986	✓	✗	Simulations Canada
Sex Olympics		1991	✓	✗	Free Spirit Software, Inc.
Sex Vixens from Space		1988	✓	✗	Free Spirit Software, Inc.
Seymour Goes to Hollywood		1992	✓	✗	Code Masters
Shackled		1988	✓	✗	US Gold
Shadow Dancer		1991	✓	✗	US Gold
Shadow of the Beast		1990	✓	✗	Psygnosis
Shadow of the Beast II		1991	✓	✗	Psygnosis
Shadow Sorcerer		1991	✓	✗	Strategic Simulations, Inc.
Shadow Warriors		1990	✓	✗	Ocean Software
Shadowgate		1988	✓	✗	Mindscape
Shadowlands		1992	✓	✗	Domark
Shadoworlds		1992	✓	✗	Krisalis
Shanghai		1986	✓	✗	Activision
Shapes		1995	✓	✗	Parx
Shapes and Colours		1991	✓	✗	Kosmos Software
Shards of Time		1989	✓	✗	Titan Games
Sharkey's Moll		1991	✓	✗	Zeppelin Games
Sheer Agony		1995	✓	✗	Logitron
Sheer Agony (Enhanced)		1995	✗	✓	Logitron
Sherlock - The Riddle of the Crown Jewels		1988	✓	✗	Infocom
Sherman M4		1990	✓	✗	Loriciel
Shiftrix		1991	✓	✗	Software 2000
Shinobi		1989	✓	✗	Virgin Mastertronic
Shoot the Moon		1987	✓	✗	Antic Software
Short Grey (The)		1992	✓	✗	Accrosoft Edition
Shufflepuck Café		1989	✓	✗	Brøderbund Software
Shutdown		1988	✓	✗	Atlantis Software
Shuttle		1992	✓	✗	Virgin Mastertronic
Sida et Nous (Le)			✓	✗	Carraz
Side Arms		1988	✓	✗	US Gold
Sidewalk	Marche à l'Ombre	1987	✓	✗	Infogrames
Sidewinder		1988	✓	✗	Arcadia Software
Sidewinder II		1990	✓	✗	Virgin Mastertronic
Siècle Des Lumières, Le		1990	✓	✗	Ubi Soft
Silent Service		1986	✓	✗	MicroProse
Silent Service II		1991	✓	✗	MicroProse
Silkworm		1989	✓	✗	Virgin Mastertronic
SimCity		1990	✓	✗	Maxis
Simpsons - Bart vs. the Space Mutants (The)		1991	✓	✗	Ocean Software
Simpsons - Bart vs. the World (The)		1994	✓	✗	Virgin Games
Simulcra		1990	✓	✗	Micro Style
Sinbad and the Throne of the Falcon		1988	✓	✗	Cinemaware Corporation
Sir Fred		1990	✓	✗	Ubi Soft
Skat 2000		1991	✓	✗	Tronic Verlag
Skate Wars	Skateball	1990	✓	✗	Ubi Soft
Skeet Shoot		1991	✓	✗	Trojan Software
Skidoo		1989	✓	✗	Coktel Vision
Skidz		1990	✓	✗	Gremlin Graphics
Skrull		1988	✓	✗	16/32 Diffusion
Skull & Crossbones)		1991	✓	✗	Domark
Skull-Diggery		1987	✓	✗	Nexus
Skweek		1989	✓	✗	Loriciel
Skyblaster		1988	✓	✗	reLINE Software
SkyChase		1988	✓	✗	Image Works
Skyfighter		1987	✓	✗	Anco Software
Skyfox		1986	✓	✗	Ariolasoft
Skyfox II		1989	✓	✗	Electronic Arts
Skyhigh Stuntman		1991	✓	✗	Code Masters
Skyrider		1987	✓	✗	Creation
Skystrike Plus		1990	✓	✗	Atlantis Software
Slackskin & Flint		1992	✓	✗	Players
Slayer		1989	✓	✗	Hewson
Slaygon		1988	✓	✗	Microdeal
Sleeping Gods Lie		1989	✓	✗	Empire Software
Sleepwalker		1993	✓	✗	Ocean Software
Sliders		1991	✓	✗	Microïds
Slightly Magic		1992	✓	✗	Code Masters
Slot Machine		1991	✓	✗	MicroMagic
Sly Spy Secret Agent		1990	✓	✗	Ocean Software
Smash TV		1992	✓	✗	Ocean Software
Snark I		1987	✓	✗	Pressimage
Snoball in Hell		1991	✓	✗	Atlantis Software
Snoofy		1989	✓	✗	Pressimage
Snoopy and Peanuts		1989	✓	✗	Edge (The)
Snowstrike		1990	✓	✗	Epyx
Soccer Glory		1990	✓	✗	Tanglewood Software
Soccer King		1987	✓	✗	Kingsoft
Soccer Manager Plus		1989	✓	✗	Starbyte
Soccer Supremo (Crysys)		1988	✓	✗	Crysys
Soccer Supremo (Midnight Oil)		1992	✓	✗	Midnight Oil (The)
Sol Negro	Soleil Noir	1988	✓	✗	Opera Soft
Soldier 2000		1989	✓	✗	Artronic Products Limited
Soldier of Light		1988	✓	✗	Edge (The)
Solomon's Key		1988	✓	✗	US Gold
Son Shu Si		1991	✓	✗	Expose Software
Sonic Boom		1990	✓	✗	Activision
Sooty & Sweep		1992	✓	✗	Alternative Software
Sooty and Sweep's Fun with Numbers		1991	✓	✗	Alternative Software
Sophelie		1990	✓	✗	New Deal Productions
Sorcerer		1985	✓	✗	Infocom
Sorcerer Lord		1988	✓	✗	PSS
Sorcerer of Claymorgue Castle (The)		1987	✓	✗	Keypunch Software
Sorcery Plus		1988	✓	✗	Virgin Mastertronic
Soul Crystal		1992	✓	✗	Starbyte
Souldrinker		1990	✓	✗	Zenobi Software
Space 1889		1992	✓	✗	Empire Software
Space Ace		1990	✓	✗	ReadySoft
Space Ace II - Borf's Revenge		1992	✓	✗	ReadySoft
Space Ball		1989	✓	✗	Microvideo Games
Space Baller		1988	✓	✗	International Software Köln
Space Conquest - A Galactic Odyssey		1989	✓	✗	StarSoft Development Laboratories
Space Crusade		1992	✓	✗	Gremlin Graphics
Space Cutter	Whirligig	1988	✓	✗	Rainbird
Space Fighter		1996	✓	✗	Frontier Software
Space Gun		1992	✓	✗	Ocean Software
Space Harrier	Space Harrier - 20 Levels Edition	1988	✓	✗	Elite
Space Harrier II		1990	✓	✗	Grandslam Entertainment
Space Killer		1988	✓	✗	Oiseau Vert (L')
Space Math		1987	✓	✗	Intracorp, Inc.
Space Monsters		1990	✓	✗	MicroMagic
Space Pilot		1986	✓	✗	Kingsoft
Space Quest - The Sarien Encounter		1987	✓	✗	Sierra On-Line
Space Quest II		1987	✓	✗	Sierra On-Line
Space Quest III		1989	✓	✗	Sierra On-Line
Space Racer		1988	✓	✗	Loriciel
Space Rogue		1990	✓	✗	Origin Systems
Space Shuttle	Space Shuttle II	1987	✓	✗	Microdeal
Space Station		1986	✓	✗	Eidersoft
Space Station Oblivion	Driller	1988	✓	✗	Epyx
Spaceball	Starball	1988	✓	✗	Rainbow Arts
Spaceport		1987	✓	✗	reLINE Software
Spacola		1991	✓	✗	Dongleware
Special Forces		1992	✓	✗	MicroProse
Speedball		1988	✓	✗	Image Works
Speedball 2		1990	✓	✗	Image Works
Speedboat Assassin		1989	✓	✗	Virgin Mastertronic
Spell Bound		1990	✓	✗	Psygnosis
Spellbound Dizzy		1992	✓	✗	Code Masters
Spellbound!		1991	✓	✗	Lander Software
Spellbreaker		1986	✓	✗	Infocom
Spellfire the Sorcerer		1991	✓	✗	Code Masters
Spherical		1989	✓	✗	Rainbow Arts
Sphinx (Le)		1987	✓	✗	Logisoft
Spidertronic		1988	✓	✗	Ère Informatique
Spikey in Transylvania		1992	✓	✗	Code Masters
Spindizzy Worlds		1990	✓	✗	Electric Dreams
Spirit of Adventure		1991	✓	✗	Starbyte
Spirit of Excalibur		1991	✓	✗	Virgin Games
Spitfire 40		1988	✓	✗	Mirrorsoft
Spitting Image		1988	✓	✗	Domark
Sporting Triangles		1989	✓	✗	CDS Software
Spot - The Computer Game!		1990	✓	✗	Leisure Genius
Spy Snatcher		1992	✓	✗	Topologika
Spy vs. Spy		1987	✓	✗	First Star Software
Spy vs. Spy II - The Island Caper		1989	✓	✗	Databyte
Spy vs. Spy III - Arctic Antics		1988	✓	✗	Databyte
Spy Who Loved Me (The)	Espion Qui M'aimait (L')	1990	✓	✗	Domark
ST Karate		1986	✓	✗	Eidersoft
ST Krak			✓	✗	Ubi Soft
ST Olympiad		1988	✓	✗	Atlantis Software
ST Protector		1986	✓	✗	Eidersoft
ST Shuffleboard		1986	✓	✗	Shelbourne Software
ST Slots			✓	✗	MichTron
ST Wars		1987	✓	✗	Miles Computing
Stable Masters II		1993	✓	✗	Esp Software
Stack Up		1991	✓	✗	Zeppelin Games
STAG		1989	✓	✗	EAS
Stalingrad Campaign - The Turning Point Jun 1942-Feb 1943		1987	✓	✗	Simulations Canada
Star Breaker		1989	✓	✗	Atari (UK)
Star Command		1989	✓	✗	Strategic Simulations, Inc.
Star Fleet I: The War Begins		1988	✓	✗	Interstel Corporation
Star Goose		1988	✓	✗	Logotron
Star Raiders		1986	✓	✗	Atari Corporation
Star Trap		1988	✓	✗	Loriciel
Star Trek: The Rebel Universe		1987	✓	✗	Firebird (UK)
Star Wars		1987	✓	✗	Domark
Star Wars: Return of the Jedi	Guerre des Étoiles (Le) : Le Retour du Jedi	1988	✓	✗	Domark
Star Wars: The Empire Strikes Back		1988	✓	✗	Domark
Star Wrek - The Voyage of U.S.S.Less		1989	✓	✗	Castlesoft
Star-Blaze		1990	✓	✗	Logotron
Starblade		1990	✓	✗	Silmarils
Starbyte Super Soccer		1991	✓	✗	Starbyte
Starcross		1985	✓	✗	Infocom
Stardust		1995	✓	✗	Bloodhouse
Starflight		1990	✓	✗	Electronic Arts
Starglider		1986	✓	✗	Rainbird
Starglider 2		1988	✓	✗	Rainbird
Stario's Christmas		1996	✓	✗	Top Byte Software
Starquake		1988	✓	✗	Mandarin Software
Starquiz 6.0		1988	✓	✗	DDS Software System
StarRay		1988	✓	✗	Logotron
StarTrash		1988	✓	✗	Rainbow Arts
Stationfall		1987	✓	✗	Infocom
Steel		1989	✓	✗	Hewson
Steel Empire		1992	✓	✗	Millennium
Steel Talons		1993	✗	✓	Atari Corporation
Steg the Slug		1992	✓	✗	Code Masters
Steigar		1989	✓	✗	Screen 7
Stellar Crusade		1988	✓	✗	Strategic Simulations, Inc.
Steve Davis World Snooker		1989	✓	✗	CDS Software
Steve McQueen Westphaser		1991	✓	✗	Loriciel
Stir Crazy Featuring Bobo	Bobo	1988	✓	✗	Infogrames
Stock Market		1987	✓	✗	StarSoft Development Laboratories
Stone Age		1992	✓	✗	Eclipse Software
Stonebreaker		1987	✓	✗	Softgold
Storm Master		1991	✓	✗	Silmarils
Stormball		1991	✓	✗	Millennium
Stormbringer		1988	✓	✗	Mastertronic
Stormlord		1989	✓	✗	Hewson
Stormtrooper		1988	✓	✗	Creation
Stratego		1991	✓	✗	Accolade
Street Fighter		1988	✓	✗	US Gold
Street Fighter II: The World Warrior		1993	✓	✗	US Gold
Street Gang		1987	✓	✗	Softgold
Street Hockey		1990	✓	✗	Gonzo Games
Strider		1989	✓	✗	US Gold
Strider II		1990	✓	✗	US Gold
Strike		1989	✓	✗	Mastertronic
Strikefleet		1992	✓	✗	Electronic Arts
Striker		1990	✓	✗	Impressions
Striker (Rage)		1992	✓	✗	Rage Software
Striker Manager		1992	✓	✗	D & H Games
Strikey			✓	✗	Strike-a-Light
Strip Break Out		1987	✓	✗	Pressimage
Strip Poker	Deluxe Strip Poker	1986	✓	✗	Artworx
Strip Poker II	Deluxe Strip Poker II	1988	✓	✗	Artworx
Strip Poker II Plus		1988	✓	✗	Anco Software
Stryx		1990	✓	✗	Psygnosis
STUN Runner		1991	✓	✗	Domark
Stunt Car Racer	Stunt Track Racer	1989	✓	✗	Micro Style
Sub Battle Simulator		1987	✓	✗	Epyx
Subbuteo		1990	✓	✗	Electronic Zoo
Substation		1995	✓	✗	ChroMAGIC
Summer Olympiad	Summer Challenge	1988	✓	✗	Tynesoft
Sun Crossword (The) Volume 1		1989	✓	✗	Akom Limited
Sun Crossword (The) Volume 2		1989	✓	✗	Akom Limited
Sun Crossword (The) Volume 3		1989	✓	✗	Akom Limited
Sun Crossword (The) Volume 4		1989	✓	✗	Akom Limited
Sun Crossword (The) Volume 5		1989	✓	✗	Akom Limited
SunDog: Frozen Legacy		1985	✓	✗	Faster than Light (FTL)
Super Breakout		1988	✓	✗	Atari Corporation
Super Cars		1990	✓	✗	Gremlin Graphics
Super Cars II		1991	✓	✗	Gremlin Graphics
Super Cauldron		1993	✓	✗	Titus
Super Cycle		1986	✓	✗	Epyx
Super Grand Prix		1991	✓	✗	Code Masters
Super Hang-On		1988	✓	✗	Electric Dreams
Super Highway (UK)		1995	✓	✗	Vornon Works
Super Huey		1986	✓	✗	Cosmi
Super Monaco GP		1991	✓	✗	US Gold
Super Nova		1992	✓	✗	Dreamscape Software
Super Scramble Simulator		1989	✓	✗	Gremlin Graphics
Super Seymour Saves the Planet		1992	✓	✗	Code Masters
Super Ski	Downhill Challenge, Eddie Edwards Super Ski	1988	✓	✗	Microïds
Super Ski II		1992	✓	✗	Microïds
Super Skweek		1991	✓	✗	Loriciel
Super Soccer Challenge			✓	✗	Genias
Super Space Invaders		1991	✓	✗	Domark
Super Sprint		1987	✓	✗	Electric Dreams
Super Stario Land		1995	✓	✗	Top Byte Software
Super Tennis	Match Point	1986	✓	✗	France Image Logiciel (FIL)
Superbike Challenge		1987	✓	✗	Brøderbund Software
Superleague Soccer		1989	✓	✗	Impressions
Superman: The Man of Steel		1989	✓	✗	First Star Software
Superstar Ice Hockey	American Ice Hockey	1988	✓	✗	Databyte
Supremacy: Your Will Be Done		1990	✓	✗	Melbourne House
Suspect		1985	✓	✗	Infocom
Suspend			✓	✗	Infocom
Suspicious Cargo		1992	✓	✗	Gremlin Graphics
Swap		1991	✓	✗	Microïds
Swiftar		1989	✓	✗	Accustar
Switchblade		1989	✓	✗	Gremlin Graphics
Switchblade II		1991	✓	✗	Gremlin Graphics
SWIV		1991	✓	✗	Sales Curve (The)
Swooper	Xtron		✓	✗	Robtek Ltd.
Sword and the Rose (The)		1991	✓	✗	Code Masters
Sword of Kadash		1986	✓	✗	Polarware, Inc.
T-Bird		1990	✓	✗	Virgin Mastertronic
Tactical Manager		1994	✓	✗	Black Legend Software
Tai-Pan		1987	✓	✗	Ocean Software
Tanglewood		1987	✓	✗	Microdeal
Tangram		1991	✓	✗	Thalion
Tank Attack		1989	✓	✗	Artworx
Targhan		1989	✓	✗	Silmarils
Tass Times in Tonetown		1986	✓	✗	Activision
Tau Ceti		1987	✓	✗	CRL
Team		1994	✓	✗	Impact Software
Team Suzuki		1991	✓	✗	Gremlin Graphics
Team Yankee		1990	✓	✗	Empire Software
Tech		1989	✓	✗	Gainstar
Techmate Chess		1986	✓	✗	Microdeal
Techno Cop		1988	✓	✗	Gremlin Graphics
Tee Off!		1991	✓	✗	Energize
Teenage Mutant Ninja Turtles	Tortues Ninja	1990	✓	✗	Image Works
Teenage Mutant Ninja Turtles II: The Arcade Game	Tortues Ninja - 2 - Le Coin-Op!	1991	✓	✗	Image Works
Teenage Queen		1989	✓	✗	Ère Informatique
Telemark Warrior		1989	✓	✗	DRO Soft
Tempest		1989	✓	✗	Atari Corporation
Temple of Apshai Trilogy (The)		1986	✓	✗	Epyx
Templos Sagrados - Ci-u-than Trilogy II (Los)		1991	✓	✗	Aventuras AD
Tennis Cup		1990	✓	✗	Electronic Zoo
Tennis Cup 2		1992	✓	✗	Loriciel
Terminator 2: Judgment Day		1991	✓	✗	Ocean Software
Terra Nova		1987	✓	✗	Kingsoft
Terrestrial Encounter		1986	✓	✗	Solar Software
Terrorpods		1987	✓	✗	Ariolasoft
Terry's Big Adventure		1989	✓	✗	Shades
Test Drive		1987	✓	✗	Accolade
Test Drive II - The Duel		1991	✓	✗	Accolade
Tetra Quest		1988	✓	✗	Microdeal
Tetris (Mirrorsoft)		1988	✓	✗	Mirrorsoft
Tetris (Spectrum Holobyte)		1991	✓	✗	Spectrum Holobyte
Tetris II Strikes Back		1996	✓	✗	Empty Head
Thai Boxing		1986	✓	✗	Anco Software
The Final Battle		1990	✓	✗	PSS
The Secret of Monkey Island		1991	✓	✗	Lucasfilm Games
The Seven Gates of Jambala		1989	✓	✗	Grandslam Entertainment
The Untouchables	Incorruptibles (Les), Intocables (Los)	1989	✓	✗	Ocean Software
Their Finest Hour - The Battle of Britain		1990	✓	✗	Lucasfilm Games
Theme Park Mystery - Variations on a Theme		1990	✓	✗	Image Works
Thief (The)		1991	✓	✗	Zenobi Software
Think Cross		1992	✓	✗	Max Design
Third Courier (The)		1990	✓	✗	Accolade
Third Reich		1991	✓	✗	Avalon Hill
Thomas The Tank Engine & Friends		1992	✓	✗	Alternative Software
Thomas The Tank Engine & Friends II - Thomas's Big Race		1993	✓	✗	Alternative Software
Thomas The Tank Engine's Fun with Words		1990	✓	✗	Enigma Variations
Three Bears (The)			✓	✗	School Software Ltd.
Three Musketeers (The)		1987	✓	✗	Microdeal
Thrust		1988	✓	✗	Firebird (UK)
Thunder Blade		1988	✓	✗	US Gold
Thunder Burner		1991	✓	✗	Loriciel
Thunderbirds		1989	✓	✗	Grandslam Entertainment
ThunderCats		1988	✓	✗	Elite
Thunderhawk		1991	✓	✗	Core Design
ThunderJaws		1991	✓	✗	Domark
Thunderstrike		1990	✓	✗	Millennium
Thunderwing		1989	✓	✗	Cascade Games Ltd.
Tiger Road		1989	✓	✗	US Gold
Time		1989	✓	✗	Empire Software
Time Bandit		1986	✓	✗	MichTron
Time Blast		1986	✓	✗	Micro-Value
Time Machine		1990	✓	✗	Activision
Time Race		1990	✓	✗	Loriciel
Time Runner		1989	✓	✗	Red Rat Software
Time Scanner		1989	✓	✗	Activision
Time Soldier		1990	✓	✗	Electrocoin
Times Crossword (The) Volume 1		1989	✓	✗	Akom Limited
Times Crossword (The) Volume 5		1989	✓	✗	Akom Limited
Times of Lore		1989	✓	✗	Origin Systems
Tintin on the Moon	Tintin sur la Lune, Tintin en la Luna, Tim und Struppi auf dem Mond	1989	✓	✗	Infogrames
Tiny Skweeks		1992	✓	✗	Loriciel
Tip Off		1992	✓	✗	Anco Software
Titan		1988	✓	✗	Titus
Titanic Blinky		1991	✓	✗	Zeppelin Games
Titus the Fox - To Marrakech and Back	Aventures de Moktar (Les) - Vol. 1, La Zoubida	1992	✓	✗	Titus
TNT		1987	✓	✗	Infogrames
To Be on Top		1988	✓	✗	Rainbow Arts
To the Rhine - The Advance in West 29 Aug-11 Dec 1944		1987	✓	✗	Simulations Canada
Toki		1991	✓	✗	Ocean Software
Tolteka		1987	✓	✗	Ariolasoft
Tom & Jerry - Hunting High and Low		1989	✓	✗	Magic Bytes
Tom & Jerry II		1989	✓	✗	Magic Bytes
Tom and the Ghost		1991	✓	✗	Ubi Soft
Tonic Tile		1987	✓	✗	Edge (The)
Toobin'		1989	✓	✗	Domark
Top Banana		1992	✓	✗	Hex
Top Cat - Starring in Beverly Hills Cats		1991	✓	✗	Hi-Tec Software
Top Gun		1987	✓	✗	Ocean Software
Top Secret			✓	✗	HGSS-Productions
Tornado Ground Attack		1991	✓	✗	Impressions
Torvak the Warrior		1990	✓	✗	Core Design
Total Eclipse		1989	✓	✗	MicroProse
Total Recall		1991	✓	✗	Ocean Software
Touring Car Racer		1992	✓	✗	Byte Back
Tournament Golf		1991	✓	✗	Elite
Tout à Disparu		1992	✓	✗	Logiciels d'en Face (Les)
Tower of Babel		1989	✓	✗	MCM
Towers II - Plight of the Stargazer		1995	✗	✓	JV Enterprises
Toyota Celica GT Rally		1990	✓	✗	Gremlin Graphics
Toyottes (The)		1990	✓	✗	Infogrames
Tracker		1987	✓	✗	Firebird (USA)
Tracksuit Manager		1989	✓	✗	Alternative Software
Tracksuit Manager '90 90-91 Edition		1990	✓	✗	Electronic Zoo
Traders		1992	✓	✗	Linel
Trailblazer		1987	✓	✗	Gremlin Graphics
Train-Set		1991	✓	✗	Goodman Enterprises
Trans World		1990	✓	✗	Starbyte
Transarctica		1992	✓	✓	Silmarils
Transputor		1988	✓	✗	Computer Rentals Limited (CRL)
Transylvania		1985	✓	✗	Polarware, Inc.
Trantor - The Last Stormtrooper		1988	✓	✗	US Gold
Trap			✓	✗	Alligata Software
TrashHeap		1987	✓	✗	Tommy Software
Trauma		1987	✓	✗	Ère Informatique
Treasure Island (Windham Classics)		1985	✓	✗	Windham Classics
Treasure Island (Zenobi)		1991	✓	✗	Zenobi Software
Treasure Island Dizzy		1990	✓	✗	Code Masters
Treasure Trap		1990	✓	✗	Electronic Zoo
Treble Champions		1990	✓	✗	Challenge Software
Treble Champions II		1993	✓	✗	Challenge Software
Trex Warrior		1991	✓	✗	Thalion
Trifide		1986	✓	✗	Pressimage
Trinity		1986	✓	✗	Activision
Triton III		1989	✓	✗	Wicked
Trivia Challenge		1986	✓	✗	Microdeal
Trivia Gameshow			✓	✗	Impressions
Trivia Trove			✓	✗	Anco Software
Trivial Pursuit - A New Beginning		1988	✓	✗	Domark
Trivial Pursuit - Genus Edition		1987	✓	✗	Domark
Trivial Pursuit - Junior Edition		1987	✓	✗	Domark
Trivial Pursuit - L'Édition de Noël		1988	✓	✗	Domark
Trivial Pursuit - La Révolution Française			✓	✗	Domark
Trois Petits Cochons S'amusent (Les)	Tres Cerditos se Divierten (Los)		✓	✗	Coktel Vision
Trotsky Crazy		1991	✓	✗	Esp Software
Troubadours		1988	✓	✗	Lankhor
Truck		1988	✓	✗	France Image Logiciel (FIL)
Trump Castle		1988	✓	✗	Intracorp, Inc.
Tult			✓	✗	Pressimage
Turbo Cup	Turbo Master, Turbo Cup Challenge	1988	✓	✗	Loriciel
Turbo GT		1988	✓	✗	Pocketsoft
Turbo Out Run		1989	✓	✗	US Gold
Turbo ST		1987	✓	✗	Prism Leisure
Turlogh le Rôdeur		1987	✓	✗	Cobra Soft
Turn It		1990	✓	✗	Kingsoft
Turn'n Burn		1990	✓	✗	Flair Software
Turrican		1990	✓	✗	Rainbow Arts
Turrican II: The Final Fight		1991	✓	✗	Rainbow Arts
Turtle Table Tennis Simulation		1989	✓	✗	Starbyte
Tusker		1989	✓	✗	System 3 Software
TV Sports Football		1989	✓	✗	Cinemaware Corporation
Twilight World		1989	✓	✗	Tronic Verlag
Twilight's Ransom		1988	✓	✗	Paragon Software
Twin Turbos		1991	✓	✗	Smash 16
Twinworld - Land of Vision		1990	✓	✗	Ubi Soft
Twylyte		1989	✓	✗	Wicked
Typhoon		1987	✓	✗	Gremlin Graphics
Typhoon Thompson in Search for the Seachild	Typhon	1989	✓	✗	Brøderbund Software
Typing Tutor + Word Invaders		1985	✓	✗	Academy Software
Ultima II		1985	✓	✗	Sierra On-Line
Ultima III		1986	✓	✗	Origin Systems
Ultima IV		1988	✓	✗	Origin Systems
Ultima V		1989	✓	✗	Origin Systems
Ultima VI		1992	✓	✗	Origin Systems
Ultimate Arena		1995	✓	✓	STeam
Ultimate Ride (The)		1990	✓	✗	Mindscape
UMS - The Universal Military Simulator		1987	✓	✗	Rainbird
UMS II - Nations at War		1990	✓	✗	Rainbird
UN Squadron		1990	✓	✗	US Gold
Under Pressure		1992	✓	✗	Electronic Zoo
Under the Ice		1989	✓	✗	Lyric Software
Uninvited		1988	✓	✗	Mindscape
Universe II		1986	✓	✗	Omnitrend Software
Universe III		1990	✓	✗	Impressions
Unreal		1991	✓	✗	Ubi Soft
Uridium		1986	✓	✗	Mindscape
USS John Young		1990	✓	✗	Magic Bytes
Utopia - The Creation of a Nation		1991	✓	✗	Gremlin Graphics
Vampire's Empire		1988	✓	✗	Digitek
Vaxine		1990	✓	✗	US Gold
Vector Championship Run		1991	✓	✗	Zeppelin Games
Vectorball		1988	✓	✗	Mastertronic
Vegas Craps	Casino Craps	1988	✓	✗	California Dreams
Vegas Gambler		1987	✓	✗	California Dreams
Vengeance of Excalibur		1992	✓	✗	Virgin Games
Venus The Flytrap		1990	✓	✗	Gremlin Graphics
Vermeer		1987	✓	✗	Ariolasoft
Verminator		1989	✓	✗	Rainbird
Vers l'Inconnu		1990	✓	✗	Pressimage
Vers l'Inconnu II		1992	✓	✗	Pressimage
Versailles Story		1988	✓	✗	France Image Logiciel (FIL)
Verthor		1998	✓	✗	MuCS Hannover
Veteran		1988	✓	✗	Software Horizons Ltd.
Viaje la Centro de la Tierra		1989	✓	✗	Erbe Software
Victory		1989	✓	✗	Kingsoft
Victory Road		1988	✓	✗	Ocean Software
Video Kid		1992	✓	✗	Gremlin Graphics
Video Vegas		1988	✓	✗	Baudville
Vie et Mort des Dinosaures		1987	✓	✗	Carraz
Vigilante		1989	✓	✗	US Gold
Vindicators		1989	✓	✗	Domark
Violator		1991	✓	✗	Code Masters
Virus		1988	✓	✗	Firebird (UK)
Visa pour Hyde Park	Paseo por Hyde Park	1988	✓	✗	Coktel Vision
Vixen	She-Fox	1988	✓	✗	Martech
Viz		1991	✓	✗	Virgin Mastertronic
Volfied		1991	✓	✗	Empire Software
Volleyball Simulator		1989	✓	✗	Rainbow Arts
Voodoo Nightmare		1990	✓	✗	Palace Software
Voyager		1989	✓	✗	Ocean Software
Voyager 10		1988	✓	✗	Free Game Blot
Vroom		1991	✓	✗	Lankhor
Vulcan - The Tunisian Campaign		1989	✓	✗	Cases Computer Simulations Ltd.
Wacky Darts		1991	✓	✗	Code Masters
Wacky Races		1991	✓	✗	Hi-Tec Software
Wall Street Wizard		1988	✓	✗	Lifetimes
Wall$treet	Börsenfieber	1989	✓	✗	Magic Bytes
Walz		1993	✓	✗	CWest
Wanderer	Wanderer 3-D	1986	✓	✗	Pyramide
Wanted	Outlaw	1988	✓	✗	Infogrames
War Heli		1987	✓	✗	Argonica
War in Middle Earth		1988	✓	✗	Melbourne House
War in the Gulf		1993	✓	✗	Empire Software
War Machine		1989	✓	✗	Smash 16
War Zone		1991	✓	✗	Core Design
Warhawk		1988	✓	✗	Silverbird
Warhead		1990	✓	✗	Activision
Warlock (The Edge)		1988	✓	✗	Edge (The)
Warlock - The Avenger		1991	✓	✗	Millennium
Warlock's Quest	Warlock	1988	✓	✗	Ère Informatique
Warp		1989	✓	✗	Grandslam Entertainment
Warriors of Releyne		1992	✓	✗	Impressions
Warship		1989	✓	✗	Strategic Simulations, Inc.
Warzone		1986	✓	✗	Eidersoft
Waterloo		1989	✓	✗	PSS
Wayne Gretzky Hockey		1990	✓	✗	Bethesda Softworks
Web of Terror		1990	✓	✗	Impressions
Ween - The Prophecy		1992	✓	✗	Coktel Vision
Weird Dreams		1989	✓	✗	MicroProse
Welltris		1990	✓	✗	Infogrames
Werner Mach Hin!		1987	✓	✗	Ariolasoft
West		1985	✓	✗	Talent Computer Systems
Western Games		1987	✓	✗	Magic Bytes
Westphaser		1989	✓	✗	Loriciel
Wetten Dass..?		1992	✓	✗	PCSL Software GmbH
Where Time Stood Still		1988	✓	✗	Ocean Software
Whiplash & Wagonwheel		1989	✓	✗	Zenobi Software
Whitewater Madness		1989	✓	✗	Atari Corporation
Who Framed Roger Rabbit		1988	✓	✗	Buena Vista
Wicked		1989	✓	✗	Electric Dreams
Wild Life		1990	✓	✗	New Deal Productions
Wild Streets		1989	✓	✗	Titus
Wild Wheels		1991	✓	✗	Ocean Software
Willow		1989	✓	✗	Mindscape
Willy the Kid		1986	✓	✗	Anco Software
Wind Surf Willy		1989	✓	✗	Silmarils
Window Wizard		1990	✓	✗	reLINE Software
Windwalker		1990	✓	✗	Origin Systems
Wings of Death		1990	✓	✗	Thalion
Winnie the Pooh in the Hundred Acre Wood		1985	✓	✗	Sierra On-Line
Winter Games		1986	✓	✗	Epyx
Winter Olympiad '88	Winter Challenge	1988	✓	✗	Tynesoft
Winter Supersports '92		1992	✓	✗	Flair Software
Winzer		1991	✓	✗	Starbyte
Wipe-Out		1990	✓	✗	Gonzo Games
Wishbringer		1985	✓	✗	Infocom
Witness (The)		1985	✓	✗	Infocom
Wizard Quest			✓	✗	Pressimage
Wizard Royal [color]		1986	✓	✗	Megasoft, Inc.
Wizard Royal [mono]		1986	✓	✗	Megasoft, Inc.
Wizard Warz		1988	✓	✗	US Gold
Wizard's Crown		1989	✓	✗	Strategic Simulations, Inc.
Wizball		1988	✓	✗	Ocean Software
Wizkid		1992	✓	✗	Ocean Software
Wizmo		1989	✓	✗	Kingsoft
Wolf Pack		1991	✓	✗	Mirrorsoft
Wolfchild		1992	✓	✗	Core Design
Wonder Boy in Monster Land		1989	✓	✗	Activision
Wonderland		1991	✓	✗	Virgin Mastertronic
Word for Word		1986	✓	✗	Bay View Software
Word Master (The)		1987	✓	✗	Unicorn Software
Word Quest		1988	✓	✗	Artisan Software
Word Quest II		1989	✓	✗	Artisan Software
Works Team Rally		1993	✓	✗	Zeppelin Games
World Championship Boxing Manager		1990	✓	✗	Krisalis
World Championship Soccer		1991	✓	✗	Elite
World Class Hockey			✓	✗	Reeve Software
World Class Leader Board		1991	✓	✗	US Gold
World Class Rugby	World Class Rugby - Five Nations Edition	1991	✓	✗	Audiogenic Software Ltd. (ASL)
World Cricket		1991	✓	✗	Zeppelin Games
World Darts		1988	✓	✗	Mastertronic
World Games		1986	✓	✗	Epyx
World Karate Championship	International Karate	1986	✓	✗	Epyx
World of Soccer		1989	✓	✗	Qualsoft
World Rugby		1992	✓	✗	Zeppelin Games
World Soccer		1990	✓	✗	Zeppelin Games
World Trophy Soccer	World Cup Soccer Italia '90	1990	✓	✗	Melbourne House
World War I Naval		1991	✓	✗	Schematica Software
Wrangler		1988	✓	✗	Alternative Software
Wrath of the Demon		1991	✓	✗	ReadySoft
Wreckers		1991	✓	✗	Audiogenic Software Ltd. (ASL)
WWF European Rampage Tour		1993	✓	✗	Ocean Software
WWF Wrestlemania		1992	✓	✗	Ocean Software
X Master		1987	✓	✗	Pressimage
X-Out		1990	✓	✗	Rainbow Arts
Xchess		1986	✓	✗	X-Fun
Xe-bec		1989	✓	✗	BRE Software
Xenomorph		1990	✓	✗	Pandora
Xenon		1988	✓	✗	Arcadia Software
Xenon 2 Megablast		1989	✓	✗	Image Works
Xenophobe		1989	✓	✗	MicroProse
Xevious		1987	✓	✗	Mindscape
Xiphos		1990	✓	✗	Electronic Zoo
XOR		1988	✓	✗	Atari Corporation
Xybots		1989	✓	✗	Domark
YAMicroC (Yam.C)			✓	✗	Micro-C
Ynis Witrin - Isle of Glass		1991	✓	✗	MicroMagic
Yogi Bear & Friends in the Greed Monster		1990	✓	✗	Hi-Tec Software
Yogi's Big Clean Up		1992	✓	✗	Hi-Tec Software
Yogi's Great Escape		1990	✓	✗	Hi-Tec Software
Yolanda		1990	✓	✗	Millennium
Yuppi's Revenge		1988	✓	✗	Ariolasoft
Z-Out		1991	✓	✗	Rainbow Arts
Zak McKracken and the Alien Mindbenders		1989	✓	✗	Lucasfilm Games
Zany Golf		1989	✓	✗	Electronic Arts
Zero Gravity		1988	✓	✗	EAS
Zero-5		1995	✓	✗	Caspian Software
Zombi		1988	✓	✗	Ubi Soft
Zone Warrior		1991	✓	✗	Electronic Arts
Zool		1993	✓	✗	Gremlin Graphics
Zork I: The Great Underground Empire		1988	✓	✗	Infocom
Zork II: The Wizard of Frobozz		1986	✓	✗	Infocom
Zork III: The Dungeon Master		1986	✓	✗	Infocom
Zug Um Zug Schach Für Jedermann		1988	✓	✗	Falken
Zupple			✓	✗	Micro-C
Zxym		1987	✓	✗	Mandarin Software
Zynaps		1988	✓	✗	Hewson

== Commercial games released on compilation only ==
There are 23 games on 10 compilations.

Name	Games included	Year	Publisher
Extravaganza	Haunted House, Spook	1986	Eidersoft
Games Galore	Mouth Trap, Skate Tribe, Skystrike, Yomo	1990	Mandarin Software
Gaminours	Gaminours Paysages Magiques, Gaminours Retrouve les Formes		Carraz
Jewels of Darkness	Adventure Quest, Colossal Adventure, Dungeon Adventure	1988	Rainbird
Mega Pack	Blood Fever	1988	Micro-Value
Mega Sports	Summer Games, Summer Games II	1992	US Gold
Silicon Dreams	Return to Eden, Snowball, Worm in Paradise (The)	1988	Firebird
Staff et le Margoulin	Margoulin (Le), Staff X-29	1988	Ère Informatique
Time and Magik	Lords of Time, Price of Magik, Red Moon	1988	Datasoft
Tri-Star Warriors	Crossland	1988	Soundware International Ltd.

== Expansions ==
Name	Year	Publisher
A320 Airbus - Edition Europe	1991	Thalion
A320 Airbus - Edition USA	1991	Thalion
Baker Street Detective - Cases 1 & 2	1986	Artworx
Bloodwych Data Disks - Volume I	1989	Image Works
Breach - Serayachi Campaign Disk		Omnitrend Software
Breach II - Campaign Disk 1		Omnitrend Software
Breach II Advanced Tactical Training School	1989	Modern Day Publishing Company, Inc.
Breach II Federation Collection 1 - The Azarius Incident	1989	Modern Day Publishing Company, Inc.
Breach II Federation Collection 2 - Azarius Under Fire	1989	Modern Day Publishing Company, Inc.
Breach II Federation Collection 3 - Testimony of Courage	1989	Modern Day Publishing Company, Inc.
Breach II Federation Collection 4 - Death Before Dishonor	1990	Modern Day Publishing Company, Inc.
Breach II Federation Collection 5 - Winds of Steel	1990	Modern Day Publishing Company, Inc.
Breach II Federation Collection 6 - Cry of War	1990	Modern Day Publishing Company, Inc.
Cadaver - The Pay Off	1991	Renegade
Campaign from North Africa to Northern Europe	1993	Empire Software
Championship Manager 94 - End of 1994 Season Data Up-Date Disk	1994	Domark
Damocles - Mission Disk I	1991	Novagen Software (UK)
Damocles - Mission Disk II	1991	Novagen Software (UK)
Dungeon Master Expansion Set I - Chaos Strikes Back	1989	Faster than Light (FTL)
Dungeon Master Expansion Set I - Chaos Strikes Back 2.1	1989	Faster than Light (FTL)
Falcon Mission Disk I - Operation: Counterstrike	1989	Mirrorsoft
Falcon Mission Disk II - Operation: Firefight	1990	Mirrorsoft
Fighter Bomber Advanced Mission Disc	1990	Activision UK
Football Manager II Expansion Kit	1989	Addictive Games
Goldrunner II Scenery Disk I	1988	Microdeal
Goldrunner II Scenery Disk II	1988	Microdeal
Graham Gooch Second Innings	1994	Audiogenic Software Ltd. (ASL)
Hawaiian Odyssey Scenery Adventure	1989	SubLOGIC
Hero Quest - Return of the Witch Lord	1992	Gremlin Graphics
Jack Nicklaus Presents - The Great Courses of The US Open		Accolade
Jack Nicklaus Presents - The International Course Disk	1989	Accolade
Jack Nicklaus Presents - The Major Championship Courses of 1989	1989	Accolade
Jack Nicklaus Presents - The Major Championship Courses of 1991	1991	Accolade
Kick Off - Extra Time	1989	Anco Software
Kick Off II - Final Whistle	1991	Anco Software
Kick Off II - Return to Europe	1991	Anco Software
Kick Off II - Winning Tactics	1991	Anco Software
Leader Board Pro Golf Simulator - Tournament Disk I	1987	Access Software
Mean 18 Famous Course Disk Vol I		Accolade
Mercenary - The Second City	1986	Datasoft
Populous: The Promised Lands	1989	Electronic Arts
Space Crusade - The Voyage Beyond	1993	Gremlin Graphics
Sublogic Scenery Disk 11	1987	SubLOGIC
Sublogic Scenery Disk 7		SubLOGIC
Sublogic Scenery Disk 9		SubLOGIC
Test Drive II - California Challenge	1991	Accolade
Test Drive II - European Challenge	1991	Accolade
Test Drive II - Muscle Cars	1991	Accolade
Test Drive II - Super Cars	1991	Accolade
Utopia - The New Worlds	1992	Gremlin Graphics
Vroom Datadisk	1992	Lankhor

== See also ==
- Lists of video games
