= Graftgold =

British computer game developer (1983–1998)

- Type: Video game company
- Industry: Video games
- Founded: 1983
- Founder: Steve Turner
- Defunct: Early 1998
- Fate: Liquidation
- Key people: Steve Turner; Andrew Braybrook; Andrew Hewson
- Website: http://www.graftgold.com/

Graftgold was an independent computer game developer that came to prominence in the 1980s, producing numerous computer games on a variety of 8-bit, 16-bit and 32-bit platforms.

== History ==
=== Hewson era ===
Graftgold was originally ST Software, which was founded in 1983 when Steve Turner quit his day job as a commercial programmer to concentrate on developing computer games for the Spectrum. He hired a close friend, Andrew Braybrook, to work for him, initially to convert the games to the Dragon home computer. When the Dragon disappeared from the market, Braybrook started to develop on the more lucrative Commodore 64. ST Software became a limited company with the name Graftgold in 1984.

Much of Graftgold's early success came about through its association with Hewson Consultants. Formed by Andrew Hewson in the early 1980s, Hewson Consultants became one of the UK's most successful computer game publishers. Whereas many publishers at the time relied on larger parent companies to handle the manufacturing of their products, Hewson owned his own cassette duplication plant, affording it much greater control over its ability to respond to market trends. Many of Graftgold's most memorable titles were published by Hewson, including Paradroid, Uridium, Quazatron, and Ranarama.

=== Telecomsoft era ===
Towards the end of the 1980s, it became apparent that Hewson Consultants was suffering financial difficulties. Turner decided it would be in Graftgold's best interest to seek another publisher. It left its partnership with Hewson and signed a publishing deal with Telecomsoft, the software division of British Telecom. Two of Hewson's in-house programmers, Dominic Robinson and John Cumming, left the company to join Graftgold.

Hewson was not happy to see its most successful development partner leave, particularly because Graftgold was due to deliver two keenly anticipated titles—Magnetron (by Turner for the ZX Spectrum) and Morpheus (by Braybrook for the C64)—and began legal action alleging that Graftgold had broken the terms of its contract. After several court hearings the dispute was called off in July 1988 with both sides claiming the situation was "amicably reconciled", while reports suggested Telecomsoft had offered Hewson compensation for the loss of its contracted programmers.

Graftgold produced several titles for Telecomsoft from 1987 until 1989, including its first arcade conversion, Flying Shark. However, the sale of Telecomsoft to MicroProse in 1989 resulted in its critically acclaimed conversion of Rainbow Islands being eventually released by Ocean Software.

=== MicroProse/Activision era ===
The dawn of the 1990s saw a shift in the way computer games were developed. Whereas the games of the 8-bit era were typically developed by a single individual within a matter of weeks to months, the more demanding 16-bit titles required larger teams, longer development times and considerably larger budgets. Royalties from its impressive catalogue of titles allowed Graftgold to make this transition with ease, hiring 30 additional people to work on a large number of products.

However, Graftgold's deals with Hewson Consultants and Activision proved disastrous. Hewson's liquidation forced it to sell the publishing rights for Paradroid 90 to Activision. While the game sold an average number of copies on the Amiga and Atari ST, a PC Engine version that had been in development was shelved. To make matters worse, Graftgold had also been developing Realms, an expensive real-time strategy game, for Activision when it was announced that the publishing giant was in severe financial difficulty and had begun closing down many of its international operations. Graftgold was no longer contracted to develop any titles for MicroProse.

=== Virgin/Renegade era ===
Graftgold had already established a working relationship with Virgin Interactive through its development of Super Off Road. Having repurchased the rights for Realms from Activision, Graftgold finished the game for Virgin. From 1991 to 1993, Graftgold concentrated on Sega's primary gaming platforms—the Master System, Game Gear and Mega Drive—developing and converting numerous titles for these consoles for Virgin.

At the same time, Graftgold also struck up a publishing deal with Renegade Software. Renegade salvaged a number of products that had initially been promised to Mirrorsoft, publishing both Graftgold's critically acclaimed Fire and Ice platform game on multiple platforms and Uridium 2 on the Amiga.

Somewhere between the early and mid-1990s, the 8-bit console formats stopped being viable as the Nintendo Entertainment System and Master System made way for 16-bit consoles. As a consequence, Graftgold's 8-bit conversion work was stopped. The Amiga and Atari ST were also becoming obsolete as gaming platforms. By the time Graftgold had completed all its contractual obligations for the 8-bit consoles and 16-bit computers, it was already too late to establish a significant foothold within the 16-bit console market. Graftgold developed only one title apiece for the Mega Drive and Super NES (Ottifants and Empire Soccer 94, respectively, although the latter remained unpublished).

The fledgling PlayStation market remained a difficult nut to crack. Just as the transition from 8-bit to 16-bit had escalated development costs and required a significant expansion of resources, so too did the transition from 16-bit to 32-bit platforms. PlayStation development kits were notoriously expensive. Graftgold was able to afford enough to allow it to begin development on International MotoX and a PlayStation conversion of Rainbow Islands, but it could not afford to develop any other titles. Their finances now depended on these two titles.

=== Warner/Perfect era ===
Renegade, who owned the publishing rights for International MotoX, was eventually acquired by Time Warner Interactive, but the Warner company soon began to reconsider its software publishing strategy. Graftgold's game was finished but remained unpublished for six months. By the time it was finally released, it had made enough profit to cover the large advances afforded to Graftgold, but very little extra income beyond that. Rainbow Islands (packaged with a conversion of Bubble Bobble) failed to ignite the interest of PlayStation gamers.

With very little income coming its way from its two PlayStation titles, Graftgold found it difficult to develop Hardcorps, the one title it was contracted to produce for a little-known publisher by the name of Coconuts. With an advance far below what was required to finance the game's production, Graftgold began laying off staff. An eleventh-hour rescue bid from another developer, Perfect 10 Productions (responsible for the highly successful Discworld adventure games), helped finance Graftgold long enough to seek out an alternative publishing deal for Hardcorps with Psygnosis, but this fell through after numerous delays.

Graftgold finally folded in 1998. In 2014 Turner appeared in the documentary feature film From Bedrooms to Billions (2014), a film that tells the story of the British video game industry from 1979 to present.

== List of games developed by Graftgold ==
| Name | Platforms | Released | Published by |
|---|---|---|---|
| 3D Space Wars | Spectrum, Dragon 32 | 1983 | Hewson Consultants |
| 3D Seiddab Attack | Spectrum, Dragon 32 | 1984 | Hewson Consultants |
| 3D Lunattack | Spectrum, Dragon 32, Commodore 64 | 1984 | Hewson Consultants |
| Avalon | Spectrum | 1984 | Hewson Consultants |
| Gribbly's Day Out | Commodore 64 | 1985 | Hewson Consultants |
| Dragontorc | Spectrum | 1985 | Hewson Consultants |
| Paradroid | Commodore 64 | 1985 | Hewson Consultants |
| Astroclone | Spectrum | 1986 | Hewson Consultants |
| Quazatron | Spectrum | 1986 | Hewson Consultants |
| Uridium | Commodore 64 | 1986 | Hewson Consultants |
| AlleyKat | Commodore 64 | 1986 | Hewson Consultants |
| Paradroid: Competition Edition | Commodore 64 | 1986 | Hewson Consultants |
| Uridium+ | Commodore 64 | 1986 | Hewson Consultants |
| Gribbly's Special Day Out | Amiga, Commodore 64 | 1986 | Hewson Consultants |
| Heavy Metal Paradroid | Commodore 64 | 1987 | Hewson Consultants |
| Ranarama | Commodore 64, Spectrum | 1987 | Hewson Consultants |
| Magnetron | Commodore 64, Spectrum | 1987 | Telecomsoft |
| Morpheus | Commodore 64 | 1987 | Telecomsoft |
| Flying Shark | Spectrum, Amstrad CPC | 1988 | Telecomsoft |
| Intensity | Commodore 64, Spectrum | 1988 | Telecomsoft |
| Orion | Commodore 64, Spectrum | 1988 | Telecomsoft |
| Head the Ball | Commodore 64 | 1989 | Hewson Consultants |
| Soldier of Fortune | Commodore 64, Spectrum | 1989 | Telecomsoft |
| Bushido | Commodore 64 | 1989 | MicroProse |
| Simulcra | Amiga, Atari ST | 1989 | MicroProse |
| Rainbow Islands | Commodore 64, Spectrum, Amstrad CPC, Atari ST, Amiga | 1990 | Ocean |
| Super Off Road | Spectrum, Commodore 64, Amiga, Atari ST, PC, Amstrad CPC | 1990 | Virgin |
| Paradroid 90 | Atari ST, Amiga | 1990 | Hewson Consultants |
| Realms | Amiga, Atari ST, PC | 1990 | Graftgold/Virgin |
| Uridium Special | Amiga | 1991 | |
| Offroad | Game Gear, Master System | 1991 | Graftgold/Virgin |
| Fire and Ice | Amiga, Atari ST | 1992 | Renegade |
| Superman | Game Gear, Master System | 1992 | Virgin |
| Uridium 2 | Amiga | 1993 | Renegade |
| Nipper versus the Kats | Amiga | 1993 | Graftgold |
| Global Gladiators | Master System | 1993 | Virgin |
| Ottifants | Game Gear, Master System, Mega Drive | 1993 | SEGA |
| Fire and Ice | Amiga CD32, PC | 1994 | Renegade |
| Empire Soccer 94 | Super NES, PC, Amiga, Acorn RISC OS | 1995 | Graftgold/Empire |
| Virocop | Amiga | 1995 | Graftgold/Renegade/Warner Interactive Entertainment |
| Fire and Ice | Master System | 1996 | Tectoy |
| International MotoX | PC, PlayStation | 1996 | Graftgold/Renegade |
| Rainbow Islands | PC, PlayStation, Sega Saturn | 1996 | Acclaim |
| The Fairyland Story | PC | 1997 | Hasbro Interactive |
| Rainbow Islands | Casio Loopy | 1997 | Hasbro Interactive |

== Key personnel ==
=== Steve Turner ===
After leaving a job in commercial programming in 1982, Steve Turner decided to concentrate on freelance computer game development. Initially forming a company called ST Software, Turner rechristened the company Graftgold after employing his friend, Andrew Braybrook, to assist him with programming duties.

Turner's solo projects for Graftgold included 3D Space Wars, Astroclone, Quazatron, Ranarama and Magnetron for the ZX Spectrum. He also contributed towards most of Graftgold's later projects on the 16-bit and 32-bit platforms. After the demise of Graftgold, Turner continued to work in the IT industry.

=== Andrew Braybrook ===
After a brief stint programming games for the Dragon 32/64 home computers, Braybrook's chief success was the publication of Gribbly's Day Out by Hewson in 1985. The game combined elements of platform games and shoot-'em ups with colorful, cartoon-like graphics.

Towards the end of 1985 came Braybrook's Paradroid. Regarded by many Commodore 64 gamers as one of the greatest games ever made, Paradroid was a shoot-'em up that featured exceptionally intelligent enemies, unique gameplay and fast-scrolling bas relief graphics that were quickly emulated by many other developers.

Two more Braybrook games arrived in 1986. Uridium was a horizontally scrolling shoot-'em up that required the player to navigate the hazardous surface of a number of colossal dreadnaughts, strafing targets whilst simultaneously avoiding waves of fighters that screamed past at blistering speeds. Alleykat arrived later in the year. Balanced somewhere between a vertically scrolling racer and a shoot-'em up, the game, while technically impressive, proved to be exceptionally difficult and disappointed a significant percentage of Braybrook's fan base.

Braybrook's next title, Morpheus, was published by Rainbird (Telecomsoft) in 1987. Combining elements of resource development games and the time-honoured shoot-'em up, Morpheus was Braybrook's most adventurous game to date. Despite impressive graphics, the high learning curve and somewhat experimental gameplay translated into poor sales. The last of Braybrook's classic C64 titles, Intensity, arrived in 1988. A slightly more strategic shoot-'em up, the game enjoyed modest success.

Braybrook went on to develop a number of titles for the Amiga, including the conversion of Rainbow Islands and sequels to Paradroid and Uridium, before joining the rest of the Graftgold team developing their 16-bit and 32-bit titles. Braybrook remained with Graftgold until the company's demise in 1998, at which time he was working on PC and PlayStation versions of Hardcorps. He then worked for a UK-based insurance company writing and deploying software until 2022, when he retired. He is now developing PC games.

=== Dominic Robinson ===
Dominic Robinson came to prominence as an in-house programmer for Hewson when he converted Uridium to the Spectrum (a feat previously considered unlikely) in 1986. This was followed by another classic Spectrum shoot-'em up, Zynaps, and a puzzle/shooter, Anarchy, both of which were released in 1987. After leaving Hewson, he joined Graftgold to work on the Spectrum conversion of Flying Shark, as well as the Amiga and Atari ST versions of Simulcra and Rainbow Islands.
