= Dominic Robinson =

British computer game programmer (born 1965)

Dominic Robinson (born 1965) is a computer game programmer. He came to prominence in 1986, as an in-house programmer for Hewson Consultants, when he converted Uridium to the Spectrum (a feat previously considered impossible) in 1986. This was followed by another classic Spectrum shoot-em up, Zynaps, and a puzzle/shooter, Anarchy, both of which were released in 1987. After leaving Hewson, he joined Graftgold to work on the Spectrum conversion of Flying Shark, as well as the Amiga and Atari ST versions of Simulcra and Rainbow Islands.

Robinson left Graftgold to pursue his interest in 3D graphics, moving to Leeds-based Vektor Grafix. This company was later absorbed into Microprose. When Microprose closed their Leeds studio, he went on to form Wayward Design, which he later sold to Rage Software.

== List of games ==
- Uridium (1986), Hewson Consultants Ltd.
- Uridium Plus (1986), Hewson Consultants Ltd.
- Zynaps (1987), Hewson Consultants Ltd.
- Anarchy (1987), Hewson Consultants Ltd.
- Flying Shark (1987), Firebird Software Ltd.
- Simulcra (1990), Micro Style
- Rainbow Islands (1990), Ocean Software Ltd.
- Paradroid 90 (1990), Hewson Consultants Ltd.
- Ivan "Iron Man" Stewart's Super Off Road (1990), Virgin Mastertronic Ltd.
- Killing Cloud (1991), Konami, Inc., Mirrorsoft Ltd.
- B-17 Flying Fortress (1992), MicroProse Software, Inc.
- Dogfight - 80 Years of Aerial Warfare (1993), MicroProse Software, Inc.
- Assault Rigs (1996), Sony Computer Entertainment Europe Ltd.
- Shipwreckers! (1997), Psygnosis Limited
- G-Police (1997), Psygnosis Limited
- B-17 Flying Fortress: The Mighty 8th (2000), MicroProse Software, Inc.
- Championship Manager 4 (2003), Eidos Interactive Ltd.
