= Intensity (video game) =

1988 video game

- Developer: Graftgold
- Publisher: Firebird Software
- Designer: Andrew Braybrook
- Platforms: Commodore 64, ZX Spectrum
- Release: 1988
- Genre: Action
- Mode: Single-player

Intensity is a 1988 action game designed by Andrew Braybrook, developed by Graftgold, and published by Firebird Software. It was released for the Commodore 64 and ZX Spectrum platforms.

Intensity received generally positive reviews from video game critics and had underwhelming sales.

== Gameplay ==
Intensity revolves around a mission to rescue colonists trapped on a space station under siege by alien creatures. The player's primary objective is to transport these colonists to safety using a remotely piloted drone guided by a vehicle known as a surface skimmer. This skimmer is under the control of the player and plays a crucial role in navigating the complex and dangerous environment of the space station.

In the game, the player must navigate the Skimmer across various platforms on the space station, which is divided into five levels of increasing difficulty. The skimmer, a hovering vehicle, is used not only to guide the drone, but also to fend off alien attacks. The player must carefully maneuver the Skimmer around obstacles and environmental hazards that could otherwise damage or destroy it. The Skimmer can collect Resource Units (RUs) earned by rescuing colonists. These RUs are vital as they allow the player to purchase upgrades for both the skimmer and the drone, enhancing their ability to navigate and survive the increasingly difficult levels.

The drone, operating under the skimmer's control, is responsible for picking up colonists from designated landing sites and transporting them to escape shuttles. The drone's path is fraught with danger, and it must avoid walls, obstacles, and hostile alien forces that mutate into more dangerous forms as the game progresses. The player must strategically guide the drone to ensure it avoids these threats while successfully completing its mission to rescue the colonists.

The game is won by successfully reaching the final platform on any of the five levels of the space station, at which point an escape shuttle is launched, but if the player loses all available skimmers or drones before reaching this goal, the game ends prematurely. In addition to the single-player mode, Intensity also features a two-player mode in which players take turns controlling their own skimmers and drones with separate resources and timers. This mode allows for different strategies as players can choose different routes through the space station.

== Development ==
Intensity was designed by Andrew Braybrook, known for designing Morpheus, Paradroid, and Uridium. It was published by Firebird Software. It took Braybrook nine months to write and design the game. It was released for the Commodore 64 and ZX Spectrum in 1988.

== Reception ==
Reception

Review scores
Publication	Score
Crash	91%
Computer and Video Games	6/10
Sinclair User	64%
Your Sinclair	9/10
Zzap!64	75%

Award
Publication	Award
Crash	Smash

Intensity received generally positive reviews from video game critics. Sales were lacklustre, disappointing developer Graftgold.
