= Ranarama =

1987 video game

- Cover artwork by Steve Weston
- Developer: Graftgold
- Publisher: Hewson Consultants
- Designer: Steve Turner
- Programmers: Steve Turner (ZX Spectrum, Amstrad), Gary Foreman (C64), James Hutchby (ST)
- Platforms: Amstrad CPC, Atari ST, Commodore 64, ZX Spectrum
- Release: 1987
- Genre: Hack and slash
- Mode: Single-player

Ranarama (also Rana Rama) is a top-down Gauntlet-like action game developed by Graftgold and published by Hewson Consultants in 1987. It was released for the Amstrad CPC, Atari ST, Commodore 64 and ZX Spectrum home computers. The title appears to be a pun on rana, a genus of frogs. The game concept is similar to a previous game by Steve Turner for the ZX Spectrum called Quazatron, which was itself inspired by Paradroid, created by Turner's Graftgold colleague Andrew Braybrook.

In 2004 it was featured as one of the games on the C64 Direct-to-TV.

== Plot ==
The main character is Mervyn, a sorcerer's apprentice whose botched spell turns him into a frog just in time to save him from an invasion of evil magic-users who slay his mentors. Mervyn's arcane capabilities are intact, and the game's aim is to hunt down the attackers.

== Gameplay ==
Mervyn has four types of magic and eight increasingly potent and power-hungry spells for each: Offensive spells are projectile weaponry, defensive spells reduce damage etc., effect spells activate special abilities or are area-effect attacks, and power spells fuel the other kinds. Power spells degrade with damage and a constant drain ranging from "minimal" from "vast" depending on how well their power output can meet the power draw from what other spells the player has selected, used or not. Power spells drop to level one on expiration; expiring on that level is lethal and ends the game. Commonly found energy crystals replenish some power.

The game is set in a dungeon split into eight levels that are freely traversable (but not necessarily immediately survivable), each of which is split into a labyrinthine network of rooms and houses some benevolent glyphs, 12 hostile wizards, hordes of monsters and monster generators. Rooms are not visible before they are entered, and their inhabitants only from within. Monsters cause damage by contact, attack en masse and fall easily, while wizards are much tougher and use attack spells. The latter can be defeated by attacks, but contact with them triggers a sub-game of unscrambling the mixed up word "RANARAMA" within a strict time limit. Failure expires the current power spell, but victory destroys the wizard and scatters four runes that can be used at Glyphs of Sorcery to change spells. On average there need to be 7.5 switchings of the letters. The starting positions which require the maximum of 16 switchings of the letters are "MAAAARRN" and "MAAAANRR".

== Reception ==
Reception

Review scores
Publication	Score
Crash	90% (Spectrum)
Computer + Video Games	8.5/10 (C64)

Awards
Publication	Award
Crash	Crash Smash
Sinclair User	SU Classic
Your Sinclair	Megagame
Amstrad Action	Mastergame

Crash gave the Spectrum version an overall score of 90%, calling it an "innovative" Gauntlet clone. Computer + Video Games gave the Commodore 64 version an overall score of 8.5 out of ten, stating that the game requires "a high degree of strategy".
