= Quazatron =

1986 video game

- Cassette cover
- Developer: Graftgold
- Publisher: Hewson Consultants
- Designer: Steve Turner
- Platform: ZX Spectrum
- Release: UK: 28 April 1986
- Genre: Action
- Mode: Single-player

Quazatron is an action game developed by Graftgold, and released in 1986 by Hewson Consultants. It was designed by Steve Turner for the ZX Spectrum, and draws inspiration from the Commodore 64 game Paradroid.

== Plot ==
In Quazatron, the player-controlled droid KLP-2 (or Klepto, short for kleptomaniac) attempts to destroy all the other robots in the underground citadel of Quazatron and subsequent locations on the planet Quartech. The droid has been sent to deactivate the hostile alien droids there which can be done by shooting them, pushing them off their programmed routes to destruction, ramming them, or taking control of them via the sub-game.

== Gameplay ==
Klepto in Quazatron; R8 Repair Drone and B7 Battle Drone patrol nearby.

Klepto is maneuvered across individual levels of Quazatron, which can be navigated between via a system of lifts. Levels may include floors at different heights, ramps, information points, recharge points and patrolling robots. It is Klepto's aim to destroy all the other robots, whereupon the lighting on that level is deactivated. This can be done by damaging them with a ranged weapon, by ramming into them and/or causing them to fall from a height, or by a successful grapple attempt.

Each robot has a two-character identifier which provides information about its parts and role. "X" denotes a menial robot, "U" for utility, "R" for repair, "B" for battle, "L" for logic, "S" for security and "C" for command. The number is a ranking system, with lower numbers denoting better parts. "9" is a device, "8" or "7" for a drone, "6" or "5" for a robot, "4" or "3" for a droid, "2" or "1" for a cyborg. This ranking also determines the robot"s security rating from Epsilon to Alpha. Security rating determines the level of access from information points. In addition are several special identifiers: "OO Medic Droid", "A1 Automaton", "ST Programmer" and "AB Andrewoid" (the last two being plays on Steve Turner and Andrew Braybrook's names).

The grapple system in Quazatron

To grapple another robot, Klepto must make contact with it with the grapple activated. This initiates a sub-game in which both parties must light sections at the centre of a circuit board using a limited number of power supplies. Should Klepto win, the player may attempt to salvage parts from the destroyed enemy, with a more dominating victory providing less damaged equipment.

Salvaging robot parts in Quazatron

Parts include:

- Power (ranging from the initial Chemifax Mk1 to the Cybonic Mk2), which provides power to all components, but more powerful units weigh more.
- Drive (ranging from Linear Mk1 to Ultragrav), which consumes power but determines a robots speed. Overall speed is also reduced by the weight of all the parts.
- Chassis (ranging from Duralite to Coralloy Mk2) which determines a robots ability to take damage, but may consume power and has weight.
- Weapon (ranging from a Pulse Laser to a Disruptor) which consumes power and has weight.
- Devices have extra weight and may consume power.
  - Detector displays active levels on the map screen.
  - Overdrive provides extra drive, whilst Powerboost provides extra power.
  - Laser Shields and Disruptor Shields provide extra defence against certain weapons.
  - Ram Thruster causes extra damage when ramming.

If Klepto is sufficiently damaged, it will lose all acquired parts and be left with its default loadout and low power. The player must then seek immediate repairs or risk losing the game completely. Klepto's damage level is denoted by the expression on his face, rather than an energy bar. These facial expressions, including eye blinks and looks, were inspired by Andrew Braybrook's animation techniques for Gribbly's Day Out.

When the first location, Quazatron, has been completely cleared, Klepto proceeds to the next citadel, Beebatron (a reference to a rival microcomputer, the BBC Model B or "Beeb"). Subsequent citadels, Commodo and Amstrados, are also named after microcomputers of the era.

== Development ==
Quazatron was a Spectrum version of Paradroid, which was written by Graftgold partner Andrew Braybrook in 1985. Although a direct conversion was considered, it was felt that the Spectrum could not handle screen-scrolling as smoothly as the Commodore 64. However, Steve Turner had been working on an isometric landscape engine for the Spectrum called Ziggurat and decided to use this with the Paradroid game mechanics, control system and patrol paths.

This new isometric perspective (drawing visual comparisons with Marble Madness) also provided an additional gameplay aspect – opposing droids could be pushed off edges in order to damage them.

== Reception ==
Reception

Awards
Publication	Award
Crash	Crash Smash
Sinclair User	SU Classic
Your Sinclair	Megagame

Your Sinclair reviewed the game in issue 6, awarding 9 out of 10, with reviewer Phil South highlighting the original scenario and combination of strategy and action. CRASH was similarly impressed, awarding 94% in issue 29 and highlighting the graphics, sound effects, playability and addictiveness. Sinclair User awarded the game a 'Sinclair User Classic' award in their May 1986 issue. In their issue 51 retrospective, CRASH concluded that Quazatron was a successful fusion of arcade action and strategy, superior to the original Paradroid.

One common criticism was with the game's scrolling, despite Hewson claiming that problem would be fixed by the game's release.

The ZX Spectrum version was voted 19th in the Your Sinclair Readers' Top 100 Games of All Time.

== Legacy ==
Quazatron was followed by a 1988 sequel, Magnetron.

A similar power-up game mechanic was used in Ranarama (1987), a game from the same author that appeared between Quazatron and Magnetron.

Quazatron has also provided inspiration for several PC remakes.
