= Paradroid =

1985 video game

- Original Hewson release art
- Developer: Graftgold
- Publishers: Hewson Consultants; Jester Interactive Publishing
- Designer: Andrew Braybrook
- Platforms: Commodore 64, Amiga, Atari ST, Acorn Archimedes, C64 Direct-to-TV, Virtual Console, iOS
- Release: 1985
- Genres: Shoot 'em up, puzzle
- Mode: Single-player

Paradroid is a Commodore 64 video game written by Andrew Braybrook and published by Hewson Consultants in 1985. It is a shoot 'em up with puzzle elements and was critically praised at release. The objective is to clear a fleet of spaceships of hostile robots by destroying them or taking over them via a minigame. It was remade as Paradroid 90 for the Commodore Amiga and Atari ST home computers and as Paradroid 2000 for the Acorn Archimedes. There exist several fan-made remakes for modern PCs. In 2004, the Commodore 64 version was re-released as a built-in game on the C64 Direct-to-TV, in 2008 for the Wii Virtual Console in Europe and in 2018 on the C64 Mini.

== Gameplay ==
Paradroid on the C64. The player controls the 139 droid.

Enemy forces have hijacked a space fleet by turning its robot consignment against the crew. The goal is to neutralize all the robots, thereby rescuing the humans. The player controls a prototype influence device that allows them to move the hostile robots.

The game is set on a spaceship viewed from a top-down perspective. The ship consists of numerous rooms and levels, each one populated by hostile robots or androids. The player, in control of a special droid called the Influence Device, must destroy all the other droids on the ship. Each droid (including the player) is represented as a circle around a three-digit number. The numbers roughly correspond to the droid's power or level, in that higher-numbered droids are tougher to destroy; there are 24 droid types.

The Influence Device is numbered 001. The primary way in which the Influence Device destroys other droids is by linking with them, effectively taking over them. When the player takes over another droid, the previously controlled droid is destroyed.

Taking over a droid is done via a minigame involving basic circuit diagrams and logic gates. Each droid has one side of the screen, with a series of logic gates and circuits connected together. The droids have a number of power supplies that can apply power to one circuit. Higher-numbered droids have more power supplies. At the end of a short time period, the droid supplying the most power to the circuit wins. The logic gates are the key to allowing lower-numbered droids to beat higher-numbered droids. There is also a strategy in timing when power is applied to a circuit (as two supplies of power to the same circuit result in the later supplier of power gaining control of the circuit). It is possible for the transfer game to end in a draw. A replay will take place If this occurs.

In either case, the droid being controlled by the player is destroyed. If the player beats the droid in this minigame, they take control of that droid. If not, either the droid is destroyed and the player is returned to the game simply as the Influence Device (if they were previously controlling a different droid), or the player is killed, ending the game, if they were not already controlling another droid before the takeover attempt.

While in control of another droid, the player effectively acts as that droid, meaning the player has access to its maneuverability, armor, weapons and power supplies (used during the droid-control minigame). If the droid has weapons, the player can destroy other droids by shooting them instead of taking them over, though higher-numbered droids can require several shots to destroy and might fire back. The player has control of a droid only for a limited amount of time (which is inversely proportional to the droid's number). If that time elapses, the controlled droid self-destructs and the player reverts to the Influence Device (001).

The spaceship has 20 decks, each with many rooms; the game has more than 400 screens. Doors and elevators connect the rooms and the decks. Only droids in the player's line of sight are visible, although doors being operated by out-of-sight droids can be seen moving. Many rooms have computer terminals that provide access to maps of the current deck and the entire ship as well as droid information. Each droid can access information about itself and all lower-numbered droids (this access is available to the player based on the droid being controlled).

=== Ending ===
Despite the instructions referring to a finite fleet, the Commodore 64 game never ends. When clearing the eighth ship called "Itsnotardenuff", the players are just placed back on the final ship with higher-ranking droids on each deck.

== History ==
=== Development ===
During development of the original game, Braybrook kept a diary that was published monthly in Zzap!64 magazine, in which he stated:

The thing you actually play with are robots shown from above. There's going to be lots of them. If you want to know more about a particular robot what you do is log-on to a computer terminal. From there you can sift through all the robots and get large side view pictures and you can select things to get more information. I've been working hard on it for about four weeks, but I was working on utilities—programs to help make the finished game—for a couple of weeks before that. I always like to do the character set first because it buys time while you're thinking about the rest of it. It's probably the easiest thing that you can do.

It's not really an arcade adventure—it leans more towards arcade. Gribbly's I wanted to be a non-violent game. All of the zapping and violence that I couldn't get into Gribbly's will be going into this one. Last week we designed the game's 20-deck space-ship, but I'd like to actually build one just to make sure it all works—all the lift shafts tie up and the decks fit together. Maybe I'll try using Lego. Dunno, it might work.

So far I've got a little robot skating about inside a test deck plan. You can log onto a console, select an option, make an enquiry on the test robot and get a big picture of it. The piccie uses all eight sprites combined (the maximum available on the 64 at any one time). Despite being a view from above, I intend you won't be able to see anything behind a wall. You'll have to go into a room to actually explore it.

The game was influenced by several different computer games and movies, and has some similarities to an IBM mainframe game called "Survive" written by Braybrook a few years earlier while working for Marconi. Braybrook said in a Retro Gamer interview that the droid-swapping idea came from an arcade game, Front Line, where the player could enter a tank and had to leave it when it got hit. In another Retro Gamer feature, he stated that the cover of the Black Sabbath album Technical Ecstasy influenced him, where two droids "interfacing" can be observed, along with the corridors of the film Aliens. Development started right after Braybrook finished his previous game Gribbly's Day Out and even shared some code with Gribbly's. Later when Braybrook was working on Morpheus, he did another diary for Zzap!64 where he revealed that the then recently released Competition Edition of Paradroid was 50% faster than the original. In the same series, he revealed that they had redone the Paradroid graphics in the new (Morpheus) style, which was later released as Heavy Metal Paradroid. Andrew Braybrook did another diary during the development of Paradroid 90 for Amiga Action.

Reception

Review scores
Publication	Score
Computer and Video Games	9/10
Zzap!64	97%
Amiga Format	88%
Info	4.5/5

Awards
Publication	Award
Zzap!64	Gold Medal
C+VG	Blitz Game
C+VG	C+VG Hit

=== Versions ===
- 1985 – Paradroid
- 1986 – Paradroid Competition Edition – Released as a double pack at Christmas with Uridium+, plays faster than the original, mainly due to scroll code enhancements.
- 1987 – Heavy Metal Paradroid – Paradroid Competition Edition with Morpheus style graphics (budget release in 1989).
- 1990 – Paradroid 90 (Commodore Amiga, Atari ST)
- 1993 – Paradroid 2000 (Acorn Archimedes)

=== Reception ===
The game has been heralded as one of the best original games to appear on the Commodore 64, as can be seen when the readers of Retro Gamer selected it as the best game on the platform:

Andrew Braybrook's Paradroid is a masterpiece, there's no other way to describe its sheer brilliance.

In 1993, Commodore Force ranked the game at number 14 on its list of the top 100 Commodore 64 games. Also in a 2002 Zzap!64 tribute publication, Paradroid via a community vote was ranked the best C64 game ever with the comment "there is something about Paradroid that sets it apart from other C64 games".

When it originally came out, it received 97 out of 100 in the Zzap!64 November 1985 issue with the comment "THE classic shoot em up". It also received a "Gold Medal" where 98% is the highest score ever given in the magazine, once again 97 out of 100 with the remark "A game no C64 gamer should be without", in 1989 for the re-issued "Heavy Metal" Edition. In November 1988, it was selected the second best Shoot 'em up on the C64 and in December the same year, it was selected the third best game by Zzap!64 magazine.

Info rated Paradroid four-plus stars out of five. Praising how all of the large game fit into the Commodore 64's memory, the magazine concluded that "if you like science fiction, arcade games, inspiring graphics, and intricate gameplay, you will LOVE Paradroid!".

Paradroid 90 received "C+VG Hit" with a score of 93% in Computer and Video Games and was ranked the 22nd best game of all time by Amiga Power.

== Other clones and games inspired by Paradroid ==
Several Freeware or free and open source software clones of the game have been published:

- Nighthawk for Linux.
- SDL Paradroid for Windows and Linux, current version 1.3 (March 2004), which garnered favourable reviews at the Home of the Underdogs.
- Freedroid Classic for Windows, Linux, OS X and Sharp Zaurus, current version 1.0.2 (2004)
- Project Paradroid for Windows, current version 2 (2006)
- Paradroid Redux is a reimplementation of the original Commodore 64 code, fixing bugs and adding features.
- Freedroid RPG is a Diablo-style role-playing video game based on Freedroid Classic, inheriting only the main theme of fighting hostile robots, the takeover-game, and the robot models.
- Urbanoids

=== Quazatron ===
Andrew Braybrook's Graftgold partner, Steve Turner, wrote a version of Paradroid for the ZX Spectrum called Quazatron in 1986, also published by Hewson. Gameplay was similar, but on an isometric playing field, and based in cities rather than spacecraft.

== See also ==
- C64 Direct-to-TV (the "30 C64 games in 1 joystick" unit)
