= Virocop =

1995 video game

- Developer(s): Graftgold
- Publisher(s): Renegade Software
- Platform(s): Amiga
- Release: 1995
- Genre(s): Run and gun

Virocop is a run and gun video game developed by Graftgold and published by Renegade Software in 1995. It is regarded as the third game in the Quazatron series, the others being Quazatron and Magnetron.

An Amiga Advanced Graphics Architecture version, with enhanced visuals and audio, was also released.

== Gameplay ==
In the game, the player takes the role of a robot called DAVE, who has to clear a virtual games park from a virus which has spread there. There are different zones in the game world, all inspired by other games, like a sports world, the urban jungle world, the gods world, the adventure world and as final world "Silicon Valley". DAVE has several weapons to shoot enemies, with the possibility to buy upgrades after collecting enough powerups.

At certain points in the levels, there are checkpoints which, should DAVE get destroyed, will automatically place the player back at the last checkpoint they passed, and are activated by touching them.

The end of level bosses vary across the level sets, e.g. Sports World has an Ice Hockey team which, upon defeating them, cheerleaders appear and do a routine.

== Reception ==
The game received 83% in Amiga Format and 88% in CU Amiga.
