= Exolon =

1987 video game

- Cover artwork by Steve Weston
- Developers: Raffaele Cecco (Amstrad/Spectrum); Nick Jones (Amiga/C64/ST)
- Publisher: Hewson
- Artists: Nigel Brownjohn; Raffaele Cecco
- Composer: Nick Jones
- Platforms: Amiga, Amstrad CPC, Atari ST, Commodore 64, Enterprise 128, ZX Spectrum
- Release: 1987, 1989
- Genre: Run and gun
- Mode: Single-player

Exolon is a run and gun game programmed by Raffaele Cecco and published by Hewson in 1987 for the ZX Spectrum, Commodore 64, and Amstrad CPC. It was later converted to the Enterprise 128, Amiga, and Atari ST.

== Gameplay ==
The player takes control of a futuristic soldier named Vitorc across several flip-screen levels of gameplay. The screens that make up these levels are filled with various generic aliens as well as gun emplacements, homing missiles, landmines and other hazards. The soldier can defend himself with both a gun and rocket-propelled grenades. The two different weapons are effective against different enemies.

The enemies themselves are varied, taking the forms of flying aliens of the type traditionally found in shoot 'em up games as well as homing missiles, fixed guns, tanks, land mines, swarming red pods and "crushers" which shoot out of the ground.

Partway through each level, there is a pod in which the player can "upgrade" until the end of the current level to an armoured exoskeleton with improved weapons and armour. Completing the level without this upgrade results in a score bonus.

== Reception ==
Reception

Awards
Publication	Award
Crash	Crash Smash
Sinclair User	SU Classic
Your Sinclair	Megagame
Amstrad Action	Mastergame

The ZX Spectrum version of Exolon was placed at the top of the Woolworths Top 30 chart for September 1987, with the Commodore 64 version at number 29.

== Legacy ==
After developing the two Cybernoid titles in 1988, Cecco's next game was Stormlord. It is considered a spiritual successor to Exolon and used the same main character sprite during development.

Exolon is one of the games included with the C64 Direct-to-TV (2004).

In December 2005, Retrospec released an updated remake of Exolon for Microsoft Windows. It can be downloaded from the Retrospec website.
