= 3D Space Wars =

1983 video game

- Publisher: Hewson Consultants
- Designer: Steve Turner
- Series: Seiddab Trilogy
- Platform: ZX Spectrum
- Release: 1983
- Genre: Space combat

3D Space Wars is a space combat video game written by Steve Turner for the ZX Spectrum and published by Hewson Consultants in 1983. It is both the first game written by Turner and the first in the Seiddab Trilogy.

== Gameplay ==
3D Space Wars is a shoot 'em up in which the player has taken command of the world's last fighter-killer spacecraft and must prevent the destruction of civilization by the Seiddab. The game begins with the enemy massed in front of the player and attacking. The player has a cockpit view, and the ship instruments are below the viewscreen, including fuel, speed, and a galaxy map showing the Seiddab positions. Twin lasers fire perspective beams which meet in the center of the crosshairs. There are refueling points in space which the player will need to locate. Each successive wave of attackers is more destructive than the last.

The display is in black and white. Each attack wave consists of 24 aliens, and the player has only two opportunities to refuel during each wave. Speed can be adjusted to one of eight settings, which affects maneuverability, aiming weapons, and how often the ship is hit.

== Development and release ==
Steve Turner wrote 3D Space Wars and it took about five months to develop, and this was his first game. 3D Space-Wars was released in 1983 by Hewson Consultants.

== Reception ==
Crash gave the game an overall rating of 68% and said: "A lot of playing appeal but I didn't think there was quite enough going on in the end to make it totally addictive to play".

Personal Computer Games said: "3D Space Wars is definitely one of the better shoot-'em up games on the Dragon. The sound isn't too bad, and the graphics give a convincing impression of deep-space duelling. A worthwhile romp through the universe for those with time (and Seiddabs) to kill".

John Scriven for Dragon User wrote: "Although the combined forces of the baddies, oops, Sieddab raiders, is always more than mortal man can face, Hewson Consultants have produced an excellent game that forces you to send the rest of the family away while you turn up the tv volume and lose yourself in inter-galactic battles. Definitely my favourite game of the month".

Your Computer gave the game 3 stars and called it "an excellent Dragon game [...] Once again, there is some very good stuff around for the Dragon".

Games Computing said: "Overall, it was a well-written game but I am a bit tired of "shoot 'em up" games. I became bored usually after I had scored 120 but to the space-invader game fanatic it is a good game".
