= Andrew Braybrook =

British software engineer (born 1960)

- Born: 1960 (age 65–66); United Kingdom
- Occupations: Software engineer Game programmer

Andrew Braybrook (born 1960) is a software engineer and former game programmer. He created video games such as Paradroid, Gribbly's Day Out, Fire and Ice, Uridium and Morpheus. He also programmed the Amiga and Atari ST conversion of the arcade game Rainbow Islands.

In 1986 Braybrook was voted Best Programmer of the Year at the Golden Joystick Awards. Several games, created by others, have taken inspiration from Uridium.

== Career ==
Braybrook started out writing accounting programs for GEC Marconi using COBOL in 1979. In his spare time he wrote games in BASIC for the ZX80, ZX81, and Dragon 32. His first foray into professional games came while he was playing bass guitar in a rock band with Steve Turner. Turner was writing games for the ZX Spectrum in his spare time and decided to make his break into full-time games production by starting the company which went on to become Graftgold. A few months after its inception, Turner asked Braybrook to join him in September 1983. Braybrook was commissioned by the magazine Zzap!64 to write a diary detailing the making of the video game Paradroid. This was followed by a subsequent diary published in the magazine about his game Morpheus.

From 1998 to July 2016 Braybrook worked as a senior software developer for Eurobase International. Since then he has worked as a freelance writer, programmer and game designer.

== List of games ==
- Lunattack (1985)
- Gribbly's Day Out (1985)
- Paradroid (1985)
- Uridium (1986)
- Alleykat (1986)
- Morpheus (1987)
- Intensity (1988)
- Magnetron (1988) (graphics)
- Rainbow Islands (1989)
- Paradroid '90 (1990)
- Simulcra (1990)
- Fire And Ice (1992)
- Uridium 2 (1993)
- Virocop (1995)
