= Jeroen Tel =

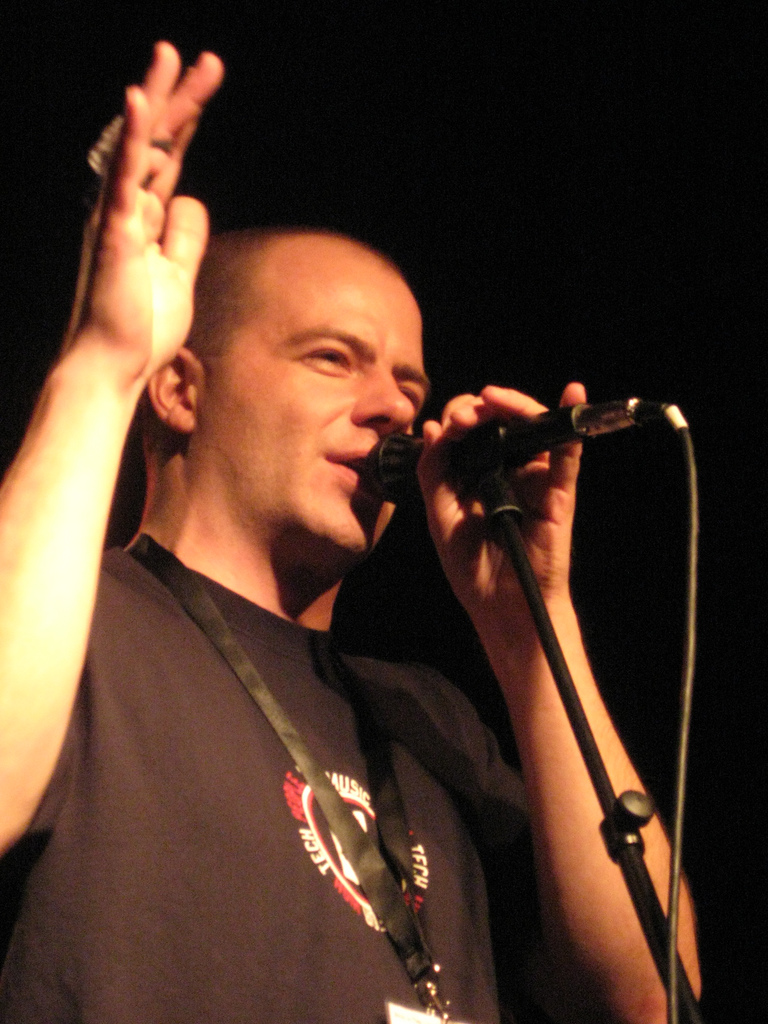
- Jeroen Tel performing at "Back in Time Live" in 2008

Background information
- Born: Jeroen Godfried Tel; 19 May 1972 (age 54); Eindhoven, Netherlands
- Genres: Videogame music Commodore 64 music 8-bit Electronic music Chiptunes; Pixel Pop
- Occupations: Composer; Sound designer; Audio director; Audio programmer

Jeroen Godfried Tel (born 19 May 1972), also known as WAVE, is a Dutch composer. He is best known for numerous computer game tunes he wrote in the 1980s and early 1990s for the Commodore 64. His most popular compositions appear in the following Commodore 64 games: Combat Crazy, Cybernoid, Cybernoid II, Dan Dare 3, Eliminator, Hawkeye, Myth: History in the Making, Nighthunter, Robocop 3, Rubicon (title music), and Supremacy.

== Maniacs of Noise ==
Alongside Charles Deenen, who Tel met at computer meetings in Venlo, Netherlands, Tel is a founding member of the computer music group Maniacs of Noise, a company devoted to composing music and designing sound effects for videogames since 1987. He worked for several years at Funcom in Norway. In addition to being a game musician, he has composed lots of modules in the context of demo scene.

== Tel Me More ==
In the summer of 2015, Tel launched a crowdfunding campaign on Indiegogo in order to produce a remix album (called 'Tel Me More') of his best C64 music. Of the $38,911 (a nod to the amount of free memory bytes when starting up a Commodore 64) goal, $27,420 was reached by a total of 699 backers. On August 8, 2015, Tel gave an update on his Indiegogo page stating that this was sufficient to create the album and deliver all the promised perks. In posts on the campaign page, he claimed to still be working on completing the project as of February 2020. However, in the beginning of February 2022, the project was marked as closed without any comment from Tel. In a June 2023 comment on SoundCloud, Tel stated his intention of getting the project "out of the way".

== Discography ==
=== Soundtracks by Jeroen Tel ===
The following are soundtracks composed by Tel.

Title	Publisher	Released	Platform	Credit	Notes
A-TEAM, THE	Fox Digital Entertainment	2010	(Mobile Game)	Composer / Sound Designer	
Honey Switch Deluxe	Zylom	2005	(PC)	Composer / Sound Designer	
Fortuna Mahjongg Deluxe	Zylom	2004	(PC)	Composer / Sound Designer	
Geweldenaren van Ver (Short)	(No publisher)	2004	Micro movie	Composer / Sound Designer	
Alien Scum	Synergenix	2002	(Mobile Game)	Composer / Sound Designer	
Abyss, The	Synergenix	2002	(Mobile Game)	Composer / Sound Designer	
Hive, The	Synergenix	2002	(Mobile Game)	Composer / Sound Designer	
Minerman	Synergenix	2002	(Mobile Game)	Composer / Sound Designer	
Slot Machine	Synergenix	2002	(Mobile Game)	Composer / Sound Designer	
Suske en Wiske: De Tijdtemmers	Infogrames	2001	(Game Boy Color)	Composer / Sound Designer	
ASML ESD Clean Training		2001	(Website)		
Warlocked	Bits Studios/Nintendo	2000	(Game Boy Color)	Composer / Sound Designer	The first ever Nintendo published handheld game to feature Jeroen Tel's music
Big Brother: The Game	SoftMACHINE Publishing International BV	2000	(PC)	Composer / Sound Designer	
Casino		1999	(PC)	Composer / Sound Designer	
Crimson's Mystery	(No publisher)	1999	(Game Boy Color)	Composer	Unreleased.
FACT		1999	(PC)		
Football Manager		1999	(PC)	Composer / Sound Designer	
Christmas Crisis		1995	(CD-i)		
Family Games II: Junkfood Jive		1995	(CD-i)		
Flippo House		1995	(CDS)	Composer / Artist	
Disney's Beauty and the Beast	Hudson Soft	1994	(NES)	Composer / Sound Designer	
Alien III	LJN, Ltd.	1993	(NES)	Composer / Sound Designer	
Bram Stoker Dracula	Sony Imagesoft	1993	(Game Boy)	Composer / Sound Designer	
Bram Stoker Dracula	Sony Imagesoft	1993	(Master System) (NES)	Composer / Sound Designer	
California Games II	SEGA	1993	(Master System) (Game Gear)	Composer / Sound Designer	
Flash, The		1993	(Master System) (Game Gear)	Composer / Sound Designer	
Lemmings	Psygnosis	1993	(C64)	Composer / Sound Designer	
Overlord	Virgin Interactive	1993	(NES)	Composer / Sound Designer	
The A-Team (video game)		1992	(Game Gear) (Master System)	Composer / Sound Designer	Unreleased.
Agony	Psygnosis	1992	(Amiga)	Composer	
Fruit Fantasies		1992	(Amiga)	Composer	
Facts of Life	Witan	1992	(PC) Demo	Composer	
Robocop 3	Ocean Software Ltd. (C64) and Ocean of America, Inc. (NES)	1992	(C64) (NES)	Composer / Sound Designer	
Outrun Europe	SEGA Corporation, U.S. Gold Ltd.	1991	(C64)	Composer / Sound Designer	
Rubicon	21st Century Entertainment Ltd.	1991	(C64)	Composer	
Smash TV	Acclaim Entertainment, Inc.	1991	(C64)	Composer / Sound Designer	
Supremacy	Virgin Interactive	1991	(C64)	Composer / Sound Designer	
VIZ the Game	Virgin Interactive	1991	(Amiga) (C64)		
Back to the Future III	Image Works	1991	(C64)	Co-composer with Charles Deenen	
Bad Blood	ORIGIN Systems, Inc.	1991	(C64)		
Dan Dare III: The Escape	Virgin Interactive	1990	(C64)		
Golden Axe (video game)	Virgin Mastertronic	1990	(C64)		
Hot Rod	Activision, Inc.	1990	(C64)		
Inve$t	Starbyte Software	1990	(C64)		
Turbo Outrun (Best Music ECTS Award)	SEGA	1990	(C64)		Best Music ECTS Award
Supremacy	Virgin Interactive	1990	(Amiga)	Composer / Sound Designer	
Deliverance: Stormlord II	Hewson Consultants	1990	(C64)		
Poseidon: Planet Eleven	Hi-Tec Software Ltd.	1990	(C64)		
Iron Lord	Ubi Soft Entertainment Software	1990 for C64 and 1989 for Amiga	(Amiga) (C64)		
Afterburner (USA version)	SEGA	1989	(C64)		
Drag race 2000		1989	(Arcade cabinet)		
Dynamix	Virgin Mastertronic	1989	(C64)		
F14 Tomcat	Dynamix	1989	(C64)		
Myth: History in the Making	System 3 Software Ltd.	1989	(C64)		
Stormlord	Hewson Consultants	1989	(C64) (Amiga)		
Tintin on the Moon	Infogrames Europe SA	1989	(C64)		
2400 A.D.	ORIGIN Systems, Inc.	1988	(C64)		Unreleased.
Alloyrun	Starlight Software	1988	(C64)		
Aspar GP Master	Dinamic Software	1988	(C64)		
Battle Valley	Rack-It	1988	(C64)		
Combat Crazy A.K.A. War Bringer	Silverbird (software label)	1988	(C64)		
Cybernoid: The Fighting Machine	Hewson Consultants	1987	(C64)		
Cybernoid II: The Revenge	Hewson Consultants	1988	(C64)		
Eliminator	Hewson Consultants	1988	(C64)		
Gaplus	Mastertronic	1988	(C64)		
G.I. Hero		1988	(C64)		Unreleased.
Ice Age	Firebird Software	1988	(C64)		
Navy Moves	Dinamic Software	1988	(C64)		
Savage	Firebird Software	1988	(C64)		
Scout	Mastertronic	1988	(C64)		
Hawkeye	Thalamus Ltd.	1987	(C64)		
BeachKing Stunt Racer			(PS2) (PC)		
Brabant Stad (Promo)					
David Bravo (Cartoon)					
Deadly Skies			(PlayStation)		
DLO Research			(Television program)		
Don Horn			(PC)		
EA Sports			(JAKKS TV Game)		
Empire			(FM)		
ETV Leader			(RL)		
Gold Rush Deluxe			(PC)		
Gordon's Cinderella			(PC)		
House of Cards 2 Deluxe					
Hypnosis 1995			(PC) Demo		
Janssen en Janssen			(CDS)		
Johny Walker Moorhuhn Jagd			(PC)		
Jule Shuffle (Online Game)					
Just Kidding			(CD)		
Knoop in je Zakdoek 1994, 95, 96, 97			(Television program)		
Lethal Weapon III			(Master System)		
Logitech Puzzle Game			(PC) Demo		
Mercury			(Slot machine)		
Moorhuhn			(PC)		
Moorhuhn 2			(PC)		
Mortal Kombat			(JAKKS TV Game)		
Motors			(PC)		
Nanuk			(PC)		
NBA Hangtime			(Sega Genesis) (Super NES)		
Nicktoons Basketball			(PC)		
Nighthunter			(C64)		
Nintendo Starwing			(Television commercial)		
NNCDROM			CD-ROM		Business Presentation
North and South		1991	(C64)		
No-TV Visual Music No.2			(DVD)		
No Nonsense Consultancy			(Website)		
Original Video Game Sound Effects			(CD)		
Outrun 2			(C64)		
Pocahontas			(Super NES)		
Poodle-e-razor			(PC)		
Power Play			(Television program)		
Raffzahn			(PC)		
Rhino Rumble			(PC) (Game Boy Color)		
RTL France			Television (Station identification)		
R-Xerox			(Television commercial)		
Ruflo Easyfloor			(Animation)		
Space Ranger			(PC)	Sound FX only	
Spark Media Arts Festival			(Animation)		
Starwing			(Television commercial) (RC)		
Stork Aerospace F35 JSF			(3d animation)		
Super Monaco GP		1991	(C64)		
Supercash			(Amiga)		
Suske en Wiske - De Roekeloze Ruimtereis					
Suske en Wiske - Het Geheim van de Farao					
Synthetic			(AD)		
Techno Cop		1992	(NES)		
Teenage Mutant Ninja Turtles			(Amiga) (C64)		
TELEAC			(TV) Television (Station identification) (TVT) (RP)		
Tetris 94			(C64)		
The Video Game Soundmakers			(CD)		
TMax			(Pocket PC)		
Trivia Ultimate Challenge			(C64)		
Video Game Soundmakers, The			(CD)		
Vivid Video			(CD)		
Warlocked	Nintendo	2000	(Game Boy Color)	Music and Sound FX	
W.A.R.			(PC)		
Winter Gold			(Super NES)		
Z-Mess-House			(CDS)		
ZYLOM Music Logo					
ZZPLANET			(Animation)		
