= Seiddab Trilogy =

Video game series

The Seiddab Trilogy
- Developer: Graftgold
- Publisher: Hewson Consultants
- Designer: Steve Turner
- Series: The Seiddab Trilogy
- Platform: ZX Spectrum
- Release: 3D Space-Wars: 1983; 3D Seiddab Attack: 1984; 3D Lunattack: 1984
- Genre: Shoot 'em up
- Mode: Single-player

The Seiddab Trilogy is a series of video games designed by Steve Turner (as Graftgold) for the ZX Spectrum and published by Hewson Consultants. It consists of 3D Space-Wars (1983), 3D Seiddab Attack (1984), and 3D Lunattack. All three games were later published together as The Seiddab Trilogy by Hewson for the Rotronics Wafadrive. The series name is derived from the word "baddies" being spelt in reverse.

Astroclone (1985), also written by Turner, is part of this series.

== 3D Space-Wars ==
3D Space-Wars was released in 1983 by Hewson Consultants.

== 3D Seiddab Attack ==
3D Seiddab Attack was released in 1984 by Hewson Consultants.

=== Critical reception ===
Your Spectrum's review highlighted the realistic 3D effect and split-screen display, but criticized the monochrome graphics and slow game speed. Sinclair User awarded 5 out of 10, criticizing the unclear, flickering display but praising a sophisticated concept and satisfying explosions. Personal Computer Games were unimpressed with the 3D effect and felt that the enemy ships were indistinct and the action unexciting.

== 3D Lunattack ==
3D Lunattack was released in 1984 by Hewson Consultants, and is the only game of the series that was also published for the Commodore 64. The player takes control of a Z5 Luna Hover Fighter in an attack against the Seiddab command base. The Z5 must be piloted through three rings of defence before destroying the base.

=== Gameplay ===
The game requires the player to attack the Seiddab base, which is protected by three rings of defense. The first consists of robotically controlled tanks which fire missiles; these tanks can be destroyed by laser fire. The second ring is an area of mountains protected by mines, which are set to explode when the player gets too close. They may be shot using the Z5's lasers, or dodged. An exploding mine rocks the players craft altering its course. The third ring of defence is studded with missile silos, which may be attacked with the Z5's lasers. If the player manages to penetrate the command zone, the base must be repeatedly strafed while avoiding its defensive firepower.

At any time the player may be attacked by Seiddab fighters. The Z5 is armed with air-to-air missiles that can be used to destroy the enemy fighters before they come into range. Once they are visible, the lasers must be used. Weapon selection is automatic - if the target is below the horizon lasers will be used, but if the target is above then missiles will be fired.

The screen displays a cockpit with a horizon of mountains, and enemy craft displayed, and crosshair sights of the Z5's weaponry. There is also a radar display which switches on automatically when an enemy hover fighter is detected, and places a small box near the enemy location indicating the range to the fighter. At this stage missiles may be fired and forgotten.

Below the main display are indicators for fuel, armament type in use and hull temperature, which increases to a critical point with each enemy strike.

An additional audio track was included on the cassette tape. 3D Lunattack also supported Currah Microspeech.

=== Reception ===
Reception

Review scores
Publication	Score
Crash	90% (A CRASH Smash)
Sinclair User	6/10

Reviews were mixed. While Sinclair User only gave the game 6/10, CRASH awarded it a CRASH Smash at 90%.

Sinclair User said that "the controls are difficult to handle and of the type where you lose position rapidly through having to over-correct continually", while CRASH decided that "the display is wonderful, the best three dimensional Battlezone-type game yet... Really excellent, most playable and addictive too".

== Astroclone ==
Astroclone
- Developer: Graftgold
- Publisher: Hewson Consultants
- Designer: Steve Turner
- Series: The Seiddab Trilogy
- Platform: ZX Spectrum
- Release: 1985
- Genre: Action-adventure
- Mode: Single-player

Astroclone was published in 1985 by Hewson Consultants. Its working title was Seiclone, but was changed to avoid confusion with Vortex Software's Cyclone. The game combines shoot 'em up sections with arcade adventure elements that Turner had developed with Avalon (1984) and Dragontorc (1985).
