= Deliverance (video game) =

1993 video game

- Developer(s): 21st Century Entertainment
- Publisher(s): 21st Century Entertainment
- Producer(s): Barry Simpson
- Programmer(s): Peter Verswyvelen; Christian Morant (Mac)
- Artist(s): Kim Goossens, nl:Eugeen Goossens, Hughes De Jonghe (Mac)
- Composer(s): Bent Nielsen
- Platform(s): Amiga, Atari ST, Mac OS
- Release: 1992: Amiga, Atari ST; 1993: Mac
- Genre(s): Platform
- Mode(s): Single-player

Deliverance is a platform game developed and published by 21st Century Entertainment in 1992 for the Amiga and Atari ST, and in 1993 for Macintosh. It is a remake of the 1990 Hewson Consultants game Deliverance: Stormlord II with new graphics and sound, a changed gameplay system, and a different plot. A version for the Genesis was planned but never released.

== Gameplay ==
The Amiga, Atari ST and Macintosh versions are different from the original 8-bit game, bearing similarity in its graphical style and gameplay to the 1991 game Gods. The final section of the game involves riding on back of an undead dragon.

== Plot ==
Stormlord has succeeded in his mission to free the realm's fairies, but failed to slay the wicked Queen Bahd, who managed to escape and vanished. Eventually, after many years of peace and harmony, Bahd has returned, this time in league with Satan himself. With his help, she has again kidnapped the fairies, and so Stormlord has to return and finish the job he originally set out to do. His task is to locate, free and then deliver the imprisoned fairies from Satan's Palace, through the Pits of Hell and the Enchanted Forest, to the devil-ridden skies of Heaven, where he can use the amassed power of the rescued fairy-folk to defeat the forces of evil once and for all.

== Reception ==
The game was well received, including being awarded the monthly awards of "Gamer Gold" by Amiga Computing and "CU Screen Star" by CU Amiga. Computer Gaming World said in March 1994 that the Mac version "will entertain action- and strategy gamers for hours with its superb graphics and challenging gameplay".

The One gave the Amiga version of Deliverance an overall score of 81%, heavily comparing it to Gods, beginning their review by stating "Deliverance does bear a distressing likeness to the Bitmaps' arcade epic - the first level is such a carbon copy that you wonder how they expect to get away with it" but express that "Later levels, however, show there's a lot more graphical variety to Deliverance than Gods - and it doesn't stop there. I'd go as far to say that Deliverance is a more playable and enjoyable game." The One praises Deliverance's gameplay, stating that it is "fast, frenetic, absolutely chock full of hard-nosed axe-chucking action and lovely to look at ... the no-nonsense baddy-battling and exploration action makes Deliverance easily one of the best arcade adventures I've seen this year." The One furthermore remarks that "Deliverance is packed to the brim with good ideas and neat touches." The One criticises the final level, calling it "a real departure from the first three" and describe its gameplay as "a lacklustre slow-scrolling shoot-'em-up ... As a shoot'em-up it's a rather poor effort, and seems a bit out of place", and also describes Deliverance as "nothing spectacularly original".
