= Jukka Tapanimäki =

Finnish video game programmer (1961-2000)

- Born: 11 August 1961
- Died: 1 May 2000 (aged 38)
- Occupation: Software developer
- Known for: Commodore 64 games

Cover of "Netherworld" featuring Tapanimäki

Jukka Tapanimäki (11 August, 1961 – 1 May, 2000) was a Finnish game programmer from Tampere, Pirkanmaa. Tapanimäki wrote his games for the Commodore 64 computer, and many have been ported to other computer systems. Tapanimäki was a reviewer for MikroBitti and "C" computer magazines; and a freelance writer of advanced-level computer programming articles. He also published a book called C-64 Pelintekijän Opas (or "C-64 Game Maker's Guide") in 1990.

== Career choice ==
Tapanimäki was originally interested in a career as a graphic designer for advertisements. After failing the entrance exams to the University of Art and Design Helsinki twice, he instead started studying literature in 1984. In summer 1985, he purchased a Commodore 64 computer. Although he had no previous experience with computers, Tapanimäki decided to become a game programmer after a few months. He quit his studies and went on welfare to be able to concentrate on programming. Tapanimäki spent 1986 experimenting. One of his finished programs was named Aikaetsivä, a Finnish language text adventure in the style of Infocom, which the Tamperean retailer Triosoft bought publishing rights to but did not release.

The first successfully operating game written by Tapanimäki was Monolith, announced in the June–July 1986 issue of MikroBITTI. It was followed by Minidium, a Uridium-style shoot 'em up published in the January 1987 issue of C Magazine. The development of Minidium was extensively covered in the magazine.

Early personal computer enthusiasts followed the development of Tapanimäki's career through his magazine articles.

== Commercial game successes ==
=== Octapolis ===
Tapanimäki's first commercial game was Octapolis (1987, published by English Software). Octapolis is a mix of the platform and shoot-'em-up genres. Tapanimäki created Octapolis completely by himself, except for the music.

=== Netherworld ===
The next year (1988) Tapanimäki had his game Netherworld published. The working title of the game was Abyss Zone. In it, the player has to pilot a spaceship through a series of caves while collecting diamonds. The game was published by Hewson, which used Tapanimäki's face as cover art (without first asking for his permission). The game's music was composed by Jori Olkkonen.

=== Zamzara ===
A screenshot of Zamzara

That same year, Hewson published Zamzara on floppy disk for the Commodore 64. Zamzara is a single-player platform game where the player takes the role of an alien, whose mission is to escape a laboratory complex before a time bomb explodes. The bomb has a time limit of 15 minutes. Various enemies, both stationary and mobile, hinder the player's progress, requiring the player to shoot them in order to advance. The player character is armed with a gun and various additional weapons, which have a finite supply of ammunition.

Many action game fans found Zamzara satisfying due to its various graphics styles. Some, however, complained about excessive difficulty. The music by Charles Deenen was generally praised.

=== Moonfall ===
In 1991, another game, Moonfall (inspired by Elite and Mercenary), using wireframe 3D graphics, was published. In the game the player steered a spaceship from the pilot's viewpoint. Because of agreements made with Hewson, the game could only be published two years after its completion, and was a commercial failure. The publisher was 21st Century Entertainment (Hewson's new name).

== Death ==
Jukka Tapanimäki died 1 May 2000 due to heart failure caused by coronary heart disease.
