= Onslaught (1989 video game) =

1989 video game

- Developers: Realms; Arc Developments (MS-DOS); Nextgrand (Mega Drive)
- Publishers: Hewson Consultants; Ballistic (Mega Drive)
- Platforms: Amiga, Atari ST, MS-DOS, Mega Drive, iOS, Xbox 360
- Release: 1989
- Genre: Platform
- Mode: Single-player

Onslaught is a video game that was released by Hewson in 1989 for the Amiga and subsequently ported to the Atari ST, MS-DOS, and Mega Drive. The game is a fantasy-themed platform game with an eerie soundtrack and graphic violence.

Onslaught was re-released for iOS in December 2008 and for the Xbox 360 in January 2009 for the Xbox 360 via Xbox Live.

== Plot ==
The land of Gargore is a mass of warring kingdoms, containing 16 different cults, 16 different types of enemy troops and 8 types of locations. However, even the mightiest army fears a 'fanatic', a solitary warrior who lives to fight and conquer and is remembered according to the number of his victories and the greatness of his deeds. You are one such Fanatic, a magical warrior with the strength of an army, the might of a thousand men. Now is your chance to achieve fame and glory for yourself in the battle scarred land of Gargore. Defeat the ravaging hordes of monsters, conquer the world and bring peace to the warring kingdoms. Good luck – it won't be easy!

— Onslaught packaging

== Gameplay ==
Gameplay takes place in three sections. First, a territory to attack is selected from the campaign screen; next the player is taken to the territory, where he battles through hordes of themed aggressors on a side-scrolling landscape to reach a castle, which he must also conquer; finally the player faces the master of the castle – a wizard with four spell-casting tentacle arms – whom he must defeat by firing magic at him whilst avoiding the spells that the wizard fires back. On defeating the master of the castle the player wins the territory and returns to the campaign screen to select the next territory to attack.

== Reception ==
Onslaught received mixed reviews on its release. Whilst The Games Machine gave it a score of 95% and rated it a "Top Game" and Zzap! scored it 85%, Your Amiga gave it 54%, and Sweden's Datormagazin awarded it just 3/10. Mega placed the game at #8 in their list of the 10 Worst Mega Drive Games of All Time.
