= Deliverance: Stormlord II =

1990 video game

- Cover art
- Developer: Hewson Consultants
- Publisher: Hewson Consultants
- Producers: Paul Chamberlain; Barry Simpson
- Designers: Paul Chamberlain; Barry Simpson
- Programmers: Raffaele Cecco (CPC & SPECTRUM); Nicholas A. Jones (C64)
- Artists: Raffaele Cecco (CPC & SPECTRUM); Mark Washbrook; Hugh Binns (C64)
- Composers: J. Dave Rogers (CPC & SPECTRUM); Matt Gray (C64)
- Platforms: Amstrad CPC, Commodore 64, ZX Spectrum
- Release: 1990
- Genre: Platformer
- Mode: Single-player

Deliverance: Stormlord II (also known as Deliverance: Stormlord 2) is a 1990 platform game developed and published by Hewson Consultants in 1990 for the Amstrad CPC, Commodore 64 and ZX Spectrum as a sequel to the 1989 game Stormlord. Its remake for the Amiga, Atari ST, and Macintosh, titled Deliverance, followed in 1992.

== Gameplay ==
ZX Spectrum screenshot

Similar to the first Stormlord game, there are fairies to free and monsters to mash all the while avoiding the platform traps. However, the game becomes more of an action sideways game. The game is divided into three levels divided into two sections each, with bosses and bonus levels in the end of each. All of the original's action-adventure gameplay elements are absent in the sequel.

== Plot ==
The game begins after the warrior Stormlord's victory over the demonic invasion in the first game. The evil Black Queen is gone, but her surviving followers combine their powers and capture all the fairies again. Now, Stormlord has to rescue the fairies for the second time, fighting his way through six levels from the depths of Hell all the way to Heaven.

== Reception ==
Reception

Award
Publication	Award
Your Sinclair	Megagame

The game was well received. Its original ZX Spectrum version was awarded the review scores of 80% and 85% from Crash, 8/10 from Sinclair User, and 91% from Your Sinclair.
