= Agent Armstrong =

1997 video game

- PlayStation PAL cover
- Developer: King of the Jungle
- Publisher: Virgin Interactive
- Designers: Jolyon Myers; Raffaele Cecco
- Programmer: Raffaele Cecco
- Platforms: PlayStation, Windows
- Release: PlayStation: EU: 18 September 1997; JP: 4 December 1997; Windows: EU: 1999
- Genre: Platform
- Mode: Single-player

Agent Armstrong is a platform game for PlayStation and Microsoft Windows developed by King of the Jungle and published by Virgin Interactive.

== Plot ==
In 1935, the British Secret Service's most respected asset, Agent Armstrong, must put a stop to a mysterious, evil organization known as the Syndicate. He has absconded from the Syndicate with plans that reveal their weaknesses. Armed with this information, he chases the Syndicate and their leader, Spats Falconetti, around the globe as they gradually take over the world.

== Gameplay ==
Screenshot of the jungle level showing action with enemy mortars.

The game is a side-scrolling 3D platform game. Along with left to right movement, the character can also move back (away from the screen) and forwards (towards the screen). It is broken down into 30 levels taking place in various different locations such as Chicago and the Amazon. The player, armed with a gun and grenades must fight their way through various enemies and large mid-level and end-level bosses. In addition to simply killing enemies the game also contains mission based tasks or objectives that must be completed such as destroying Syndicate supply crates in the level.

The game also features several cutscenes and FMV sequences.

== Development ==
The game was developed by King of the Jungle, a company founded in early 1995. Jolyon Myers, one of the lead developers stated in an interview with Retro Gamer that parts of Agent Armstrong were inspired by the arcade video game ThunderJaws. He also states on his portfolio website that he created the backgrounds for the game in Deluxe Paint and the cover art and other renders using 3D studio. The game runs at 60 frames per second due to specially created set construction software.

== Reception ==
Computer and Video Games magazine gave the game 2 out of 5 stating that "the action is repetitive with the same old thing to do all the way through the game.

Jeuxvideo.com gave the game 14 out of 20 in a retrospective review in 2012.
