= Supremacy: Your Will Be Done =

1990 video game

- European cover art
- Developer: Probe Software
- Publishers: Virgin Mastertronic; Virgin Games (NES)
- Designers: David Perry, Nick Bruty (Amiga, Atari ST, MS-DOS); Stephen Crow, Mark Kelly (NES)
- Programmers: David Perry (Amiga, Atari ST); Nick Jones (C64) "TGMS" (+4)
- Artists: Nick Bruty, Mark Knowles, Hugh Riley, Paul Docherty (Amiga, Atari ST, C64) "Chronos" (+4)
- Composers: Jeroen Tel (Amiga, C64, MS-DOS, NES); David Whittaker (Atari ST) "Jimy" (+4)
- Platforms: Amiga, Atari ST, Commodore 64, Plus/4, NES, MS-DOS
- Release: Amiga/Atari ST: WW: January 1, 1990; Commodore 64: WW: January, 1991; MS-DOS: WW: November, 1991; NES: NA: January 1993; Plus/4: NA: January 1993
- Genre: Strategy
- Mode: Single-player

Supremacy: Your Will Be Done, released as Overlord in the United States, is a strategy video game designed by David Perry and Nick Bruty and produced by Probe Software.

The game was initially released for the Amiga and Atari ST computers in the beginning of 1990 and later in the same year it was ported to the Commodore 64 too, but released only in the very beginning of 1991. In late 1991, an MS-DOS version was released.

The game was ported to the Nintendo Entertainment System in 1993. The NES cartridge has an internal battery to retain game saves; the computer versions came on two disks.

The NES version was among the last titles released for the platform and is relatively rare. A Famicom version was planned to be released around late 1993, early 1994 by Altron. However, for unknown reasons, it was cancelled.

== Gameplay ==
The goal of Supremacy is to create and protect a network of planetary colonies and defeat a computer adversary who is trying to do the same. There are four skill levels, each represented by an enemy race, and each featuring a progressively stronger opponent. The more advanced a system is, the more freedom a player has when purchasing spacecraft. Higher skill levels result in different numbers of planets in each system.

The game is controlled using a mouse pointer and important information is displayed in a message box at the bottom of most screens. Following the introduction screen, the player chooses which planetary system to enter. Planetary systems differ the types of spacecraft and equipment that can be purchased, in the number of planets they contain and the strength and aggressiveness of the artificial intelligence. The first system contains eight worlds and allows access to only the most basic equipment. The second system has sixteen planets and slightly better equipment. The remaining systems increase in size and strength similarly.

Planetary information screen (NES version)

The player and their opponent both begin with control over a single colonized planet in the chosen system. All other planets in between are uninhabited and up for grabs. The player must set up and maintain thriving colonies on as many planets as possible, while building up an industry and military strong enough to fend off the opponent. Because of the randomness of a system's initial make-up, the order in which planets are colonized has a great subsequent effect upon gameplay.

Before building a colony, planets need to first be terraformed using an atmospheric processor. As a planet's population grows, more taxes can be sent to a player's home starbase. However, in order to survive, colonies need to be supplied with food and energy. The player provides food by buying and placing farming stations on the colony or by transferring them on starships as cargo. Energy comes from purchasing orbiting solar satellites, but can be transferred as cargo. Cargo shipments consume fuel, so the player needs to purchase mining stations. Balancing these and similar factors constitutes the main challenge of the game.

Planetary information screen (MS-DOS version)

As the player expands their empire, they must create planetary defenses. Defense is achieved by building and maintaining defensive ground armaments on a world. The ability to attack comes from purchasing a battle cruiser and arming it with combinations of both homing, ballistic missiles and hover tanks, sending the ship to attack an enemy planet's defenses. Planets are taken by eliminating all ground defenses on an enemy world. The only way to win control over a system is to attack and conquer the enemy's starbase in that system. The only way to beat the game is to take the starbase of the last system, Yottsu. Likewise, if the player's home starbase is defeated, the game ends and the player loses.

The NES version game allows direct control over missile launch and hover tanks (1 on the map at any given time) on the offensive side, while offering direct control over the plasma cannon defense base and partial control over the pom-pom cannon and lightening field defense bases. The computer versions do not have these units.

== Differences between versions ==
The NES version is a port of the earlier home computer versions. However, there are several differences between them: The NES version uses fewer screens than its home computer counterparts, even fewer sounds, and much more simplified controls. While the original game uses units of soldiers in platoons which were upgradeable, the NES game condensed the battle elements to missiles and hover tanks against ground defenses, none of which can be upgraded. The message area is much larger in the other versions, and placed along the right hand side of the screen, compared to bottom center of the NES game. The NES game allows a single saved game to be stored, compared to up to four on the home computer version. In the NES version only credits are required to buy craft, whereas the original versions require the player to spend money, minerals, fuel and energy (though this varies depending on the difficulty level). Finally, the use of the docking bays is more complex in the home computer versions, which also feature an image of the face of the enemy that grows clearer the closer the player is to completing the game.

== Reception ==
Reception

Review scores
Publication	Score
Computer Gaming World (1991)	favorable
Computer Gaming World (1992)	1.5/5

The game was well received when originally released on computers, with the Amiga game gaining 90% in Amiga Format, 93% in CU Amiga, and 80% in CVG Magazine, and the Atari ST version gaining 90% in ST Format and 84% in ST Action. Reviewers commented on the game's playability and accessibility as a strategy title, as well as the range of different ways to play it.

the PC version was also well received, with Zero Magazine affording it 91% and complimenting the game for its graphics, animation and generally approachable game play, and Computer Gaming World in 1991 describing it as "easy to learn and a delight to play ... Overlord conquered this reviewer's taste". Though in a later 1992 survey of science fiction games in the same magazine it was criticised for not running correctly on faster PC's, with the magazine including the score of one and a half stars out of five for the game.

The later NES port had a slightly more mixed reception, with Gamepro rating it quite highly, but the four EGM reviewers being split in their opinion of the game, with two of them affording it a respectable 7/10 and the other two giving it a below average 4/10, stating that the type of strategy game play contained in Overlord was not well-suited to console gaming.

The main theme composed by Jeroen Tel is recognized as one of the best SID musical compositions ever made, reaching the 52nd spot among almost 30,000 entries in the High Voltage SID Collection.
