= Steel (video game) =

1989 video game

- In-game screenshot from the first screen of the original Commodore 64 version
- Developer(s): Imperial Software Designs
- Publisher(s): Hewson Consultants
- Designer(s): Gari Biasillo
- Platform(s): C64 (original); Amiga, Atari ST
- Release: March 1989
- Genre(s): Shoot-'em-up
- Mode(s): Single-player

Steel is a science fiction shoot 'em up originally designed by Gari Biasillo for the Commodore 64, and later ported to 16-bit machines.
