= Stormlord =

1989 video game

- Cover artwork by Nick Davies
- Developer: Hewson Consultants
- Publishers: Hewson Consultants; 21st Century Entertainment
- Designer: Raffaele Cecco
- Composers: Johannes Bjerregaard; Jeroen Tel; Jochen Hippel (ST)
- Platforms: Amiga, Amstrad CPC, Atari ST, Commodore 64, MS-DOS, Oric, Genesis, Symbian OS, ZX Spectrum
- Release: 1989
- Genre: Platform
- Mode: Single-player

Stormlord is a platform game developed and published by Hewson Consultants in 1989. It was released for the ZX Spectrum, Commodore 64, Amiga, Atari ST, Amstrad CPC, and MS-DOS. It was ported to the Sega Genesis by Punk Development for RazorSoft and published in 1990.

It was followed by a sequel, Deliverance: Stormlord II.

== Gameplay ==
The player can eliminate enemies by throwing a star-like weapon and travel rapidly from place to place by means of a particularly-powerful trampoline. In certain versions, this was replaced by a falcon. However, sometimes the journeys must be carefully planned out, since the falcon can transport the player on one-way trips, and if all fairies have not been freed from the previous area, it will be impossible to win. The player has a limited amount of time to finish (before the sunset).

== Versions ==
Razorsoft, in order to publish the Genesis release in the American market, requested that Punk Development add clothing to cover up the fairies' bare breasts.

When Amstrad Action gave the complete CPC version of the game away on their free covertape, they edited the game to conceal the controversial fairy graphics with a black square, with the intention of avoiding controversy with their young readership or their parents.

== Reception ==
Reception

Awards
Publication	Award
Crash	Crash Smash
Your Sinclair	Megagame
Amstrad Action	Mastergame

CRASH reviewed the game in their May 1989 issue, giving the game their CRASH Smash award and an overall 91% rating: "Stormlord is immensely playable, highly addictive and a great CRASH Smash." Your Sinclair gave the game a 93 rating stating that the game was "another stormer from Raffaele Cecco. Buy it!" Entertainment Weekly gave the game a B and wrote that the game requires players to think and strategize. In 2010, UGO included Stormlord in the article "25 Sexy Video Game Secrets".

In 2009, GamesRadar included it among the games "with untapped franchise potential", commenting: "Nowadays, thanks to games like Conan and God of War, bare-chested men are free to rescue bare-chested women and Stormlord is ripe for a comeback."

The Spanish magazine Microhobby valued the game with the following scores: Originality: 70% Graphics: 90% Motion: 90% Sound: 80% Difficulty: 90% Addiction: 100%

== See also ==
- Exolon
