= Bram Stoker's Dracula (video game) =

1993 video game

- North American SNES box art
- Developers: Psygnosis (Sega CD, Amiga, and MS-DOS); Traveller's Tales (Genesis and SNES); Probe Software (NES, Game Gear, and Master System)
- Publishers: Sony Imagesoft; Amiga, MS-DOS; Psygnosis
- Producers: Steven Riding; Richard Robinson
- Programmers: Mega Drive/Genesis; David Dootson; SNES; Chris Stanforth; NES; Daryl Bowers (Note: Programmed under the alias "Skunk"); Master System, Game Gear; Dominic Wood
- Artists: Mark Stokle; Andy Ingram; Gary Burley; Jeff Bramfitt
- Composers: List: Mega Drive/Genesis, SNES; Andy Brock; Matt Furniss; NES, Master System, Game Gear; Jeroen Tel; Sega CD; Mike Clarke
- Platforms: Mega Drive/Genesis, Game Gear, NES, Super NES, Master System, Sega CD, MS-DOS, Amiga
- Release: 1993: Mega Drive/Genesis; NA: 1993; EU: November 26, 1993 Game Gear; NA: 1993; EU: November 19, 1993 NES, Super NES; NA: September 1993; EU: November 26, 1993 Master System; EU: November 19, 1993 Sega CD; NA: November 1993 Amiga; NA/EU: 1994 MS-DOS; NA: 1995
- Genres: Platform; Beat 'em up (Sega CD, Amiga); First-person shooter (MS-DOS)
- Mode: Single-player

Bram Stoker's Dracula is a 1993 video game released for the Mega Drive/Genesis, Nintendo Entertainment System, Super NES, Master System, Sega CD, Game Gear, MS-DOS, and Amiga. It is based on the 1992 film of the same name, which in turn is based on the 1897 novel Dracula by Bram Stoker. Most versions are platform games, while the Sega CD and Amiga releases are beat 'em ups, and the MS-DOS version is a first-person shooter. A separate version for the Game Boy was released in 1993, followed by an Amiga version in 1994 for North America and Europe. A CD-ROM version for MS-DOS compatible operating systems was released in 1995.

== Gameplay ==
Each console has a different styled genre game based on the film, and in most games the single player character is Jonathan Harker, who is one of the main protagonists of the film, as well as the original novel Dracula by Bram Stoker. Mina Harker, Jonathan's wife, is absent throughout each version of the game and only mentioned in the Sega CD version. However, Lucy Westenra, who is also a character in the novel and film, is present in SNES, Sega Genesis, Sega CD, and Amiga versions of the game as a boss.

=== 8-bit versions ===
The Game Boy version bears a closer resemblance to platform games such as Super Mario Land than horror films.

The player controls a young lawyer named Jonathan Harker. Harker must free himself from Count Dracula's captivity, follow him to London, and end his reign of terror. It was voted to be the 21st worst video game of all time, according to FLUX magazine.

The game is also on the Nintendo Entertainment System. The gameplay is very similar to the Game Boy version, though the NES version has much smoother character animation, colors and better resolution. Master System and Game Gear versions of the game are also similar, but with a wider color palette and more shading effects.

=== 16-bit versions ===
The Super NES and Mega Drive/Genesis releases were platforming action games that are identical to each other, but have a few alterations depending on the version. In the game, the player takes on the role of Jonathan Harker. Throughout the levels, Abraham Van Helsing will help Jonathan in his quest by providing advanced weapons. The game is of the side-scrolling genre. In the game, Jonathan Harker travels through six different stages (each having between a number of areas, except for the final stage which only has one area) and fights various bosses, such as Lucy Westenra as a vampiress, Count Dracula's three brides, Dracula's coach driver, Dracula's fire-breathing dragon, Renfield, and even Dracula himself in multiple forms, such as his bat form, his young form, his evil wolf form and finally his knight form. Levels in the game include the Romanian countryside, a rat-infested old village inn, Dracula's castle, Dracula's cavernous vaults, Dracula's misty catacombs, various locations in London, Lucy's crypt, a graveyard and Carfax Abbey.

=== Sega CD version ===
The release for Sega CD makes use of digitized backgrounds and includes full motion video (FMV) cutscenes from the film. Released in North America, the player controls Jonathan Harker as he travels through seven stages that are based on scenes from the film.

=== Amiga version ===
The release for the Amiga uses digitized graphics for characters that were recycled from the Sega CD game. However, the setup is quite different. There are nine stages in the game to play through. Each stage has a primary task which involves finding and destroying all the coffins that have Transylvanian earth inside, in order to advance in the game. Like in the Sega CD game, Jonathan Harker has to punch and kick his enemies. The player can restore health by finding potions, and extra lives are available to pick up as well. Picking up Holy Crosses allows the player to fire a long-ranged holy beam attack, but only for a short period of time. Staircases and doors can be used to travel throughout each stage.

=== DOS version ===
The release for DOS is played from a first-person perspective, similar to other games like Doom or Wolfenstein 3D. In this version, Jonathan Harker must traverse several large stages to locate and purify a varying number of coffins, while warding off monsters with either a pistol or a knife. When all of the coffins in a stage are purified, Harker must then confront Dracula in one of three forms (his old man, young man, and original knight form).

== Development ==
The development on all of the versions of the game was greenlit by Sony Imagesoft producer Rich Robinson, who recommended to British producer Psygnosis to produce the video game. Psygnosis was to develop the Sega CD version and all other contemporary versions, while Traveller's Tales developed the 16-bit versions and Probe Software doing the 8-bit versions.

== Reception ==
Reception

Review scores
| Publication | Score |
|---|---|
| AllGame | NES: 4/5; Sega-CD: 2.5/5; SMD: 2.5/5 |
| Electronic Gaming Monthly | SCD: 6/10, 5/10, 5/10, 5/10 |
| Game Players | SMD: 5/10 |
| GameZone | NES: 66/100; SNES: 80/100 |
| Mean Machines Sega | Sega-CD: 51/100 |
| Total! | NES: 60% |
| Amiga World | Amiga: D |

Electronic Gaming Monthly reviewers commenting that the main character's movements are choppy, the battling with birds and bats is unimpressive and dull, and the full motion video sequences are so pixelated and blurry that it is difficult to make out what is going on.

Computer Gaming World stated of the DOS version, "It appears that Psygnosis spent most of their Dracula budget on acquiring the movie license, leaving little for game development and packaging. The game play is uninspired and repetitious". The magazine recommended Veil of Darkness or Dracula Unleashed to vampire fans. Amiga World was unimpressed with the Amiga version of the game, giving it a D and criticizing the "trivial opponents" among other factors.
