= Realms (video game) =

1991 video game

- Developer: Graftgold
- Publisher: Virgin Games
- Platforms: MS-DOS, Amiga, Atari ST
- Release: 1991
- Genre: RTS
- Mode: Single-player

Realms is a 1991 real-time strategy game produced by Graftgold Ltd. for MS-DOS, Amiga, and Atari ST. It was published by Virgin Games. In Realms, the player has to build cities, collect taxes, create troops and fight enemy cities and troops in order to defeat their opponents.

== Introduction ==
Realms shows an introduction as the game loads. This tells the story of a prince watching his late father, the king being immolated at sea. Mourning, he sheds a tear, and his mourning is rewarded by the gods. He is struck by lightning, which forms a serpent in his hands, an emblem of his right to rule the world. A tagline appears afterwards, stating "There can only be one... just make sure it's yours." After inserting and loading the second disk, the game can start.

== Gameplay ==
First, the player must choose a race to control. Each of the six races is based on a fantasy race ala Tolkien. Each race has their own attributes, including some strengths and weaknesses. For example, Dwarves prefer having an axe as a weapon, but Elves are the best archers.

After completing a training mission, which allows the player to get to grips with raising armies and keeping the population fed, the player can play any of the 10 missions on offer.

Cities

Player controlled cities can be taxed, fed by buying of grain, improved defensively with city walls and grown by cultivating surrounding land. If the population is sufficient, an army of 1000 men/women can be raised. Information about population, health rating, morale and grain amounts for the city are found by clicking on a friendly city.

Armies

A player can raise an army from a player-controlled city. Infantry or cavalry can be raised. The quality of the soldiers (elite warriors, warriors, militia or raw recruits) depends on city size and number of armies already raised from that particular city. The army can be equipped with a range of weapons, armour and bows. The army also needs to be paid. A well paid army will have high moral and recover its numbers quickly after battles, whereas a lowly paid or unpaid army will disband soon after creation. An army can be paid through the pillages it carries out, but this needs to be done regularly to avoid the unit disbanding. An army's equipment level and pay can be adjusted when the army is based in a friendly city, but there are no refunds for removing more expensive kit.

Army units will appear as coloured flags when based in a city (yellow for player controlled units, red for other units). Horse image represents one cavalry unit and an image of a man represents one infantry unit. Moving the mouse over the image will give information about the number of soldiers and where it was raised. When a unit is crossing over water, a Trireme image is shown.

World Map

The world map is a 3D world, with mountains, grassland, forests and oceans. It is also populated with cities of the player's realm and of their rivals. As the game happens in real-time, a handy 'message board' informs the player of their army movements, famine and disease warnings, and alerts regarding sieges of their cities and the cities they are attacking. Army movements can be tracked on the map using the mouse or the keypad. Unit speed is based on the type of unit (as cavalry are faster) and the amount of armour on the soldiers (lighter units move faster). An overview map allows trade routes to be adjusted. Trade routes are important to collect tax revenues and keep control of the player's cities.

Attacking and defending

The objective of each mission is to conquer all of the cities on the map. Capturing an enemy city involves laying siege to it, by sending an army to attack it. Most cities will be defended by an army, which will cause a battle to occur. The player can organise their armies formation and can maneuver them before the battle begins. Armies with bows can fire a set number of arrows at the enemy to reduce their numbers, but the bowmen's range depends on the race. When morale or troop numbers for one side fall sufficiently, that side loses the battles and the troops retreat. A player can order a retreat, but this has a bad effect on the army's morale.

Depending on grain levels, morale and whether a city has walls, a city can take a while to fall to a siege. When a city falls, it can be sacked, razed to the ground or captured. If the player captures a city with a different race from their own, they can raise army units with that race, enabling specialised armies to be created in the later stages of the mission.

Games can take many hours to complete, but there is a save game option to allow progress to be saved.

== Reception ==
Computer Gaming World reviewed the MS-DOS version, stating that the game's high difficulty level and "awkward interface" made Realms best suited for "tenacious fantasy wargamers with the perseverance to learn the game system and master the included scenarios". The magazine concluded that the game "advances the genre but doesn't quite usurp SSG's Warlords as the quintessential fantasy wargame". The game was reviewed in 1993 in Dragon #194 by Hartley, Patricia, and Kirk Lesser in "The Role of Computers" column. The reviewers gave the game 3½ out of 5 stars.

The One gave the Amiga version of Realms an overall score of 81%, starting their review by saying "Yes, it's like Powermonger and no, it's not as good." The One highly criticizes the gameplay, stating that "Realms has missed quite a few opportunities with its design, most notably in the combat sections. The whole process of laying siege to a town is glossed over and the battles could have had a lot more depth and strategic content." The One's main criticism of Realms is unoriginality, expressing that "[Realms] is trying to enter a market that's flooded with similar strategy titles ... [Realms] is little different from many others". Despite this criticism, The One says that Realms "Doesn't enter any new territory but does what it sets out to do with a degree of competence", and praises the controls as "concise and easy to get to grips with".
