= Fire and Ice (video game) =

1992 video game

- Atari ST cover
- Developer: Graftgold
- Publisher: Renegade Software
- Designers: Andrew Braybrook; Phillip Williams
- Composer: Jason Page
- Platforms: Amiga, Amiga CD32, Atari ST, MS-DOS, RISC OS, Master System
- Release: 1992: Amiga, ST; 1993: MS-DOS; 1994: CD32; 1995: RISC OS; 1996: Master System
- Genre: Platform
- Mode: Single-player

Fire and Ice: The Daring Adventures of Cool Coyote is a platform game created by Graftgold for the Amiga and the Atari ST, released in 1992 by Renegade.

Master System and Game Gear versions were developed by Graftgold for Virgin Games. The CD32 version was enhanced to include detailed background scenery, 256 on-screen colors and several layers of parallax scrolling.

== Gameplay ==
Amiga screenshot

The player takes control of "Cool Coyote". The goal of each level is to find the exit door and unlock it. To do so, a key is required, which consists of several pieces. Monsters have pieces of the key in their possession, which means the player must find and kill them in order to gather all the pieces. Attacking a monster works by shooting projectiles at it. This causes no damage though and instead freezes it for a short time after receiving enough hits. The player then has to touch the monster while it is frozen to kill it.

== Development ==
Braybrook stated that a Mega Drive conversion was completed but not released. Likewise, a Game Gear version was also planned but not released.

== Reception ==
Reception

Review score
Publication	Score
The One	92%

Critics regarded the game as an exceptionally well-done platformer. For example, it was "game of the month" in the August 1992 issue of Amiga Mania magazine with a rating of 92%, received an "Amiga Action Super League Accolade" in the June 1992 issue of Amiga Action magazine with a rating of 91% and was awarded a "CU Screen Star" in the May 1992 issue of CU Amiga magazine with a rating of 90%.

Spanish magazine Super Juegos gave the Amiga CD32 version 90.
