= Cybernoid II: The Revenge =

1988 video game

- Publisher: Hewson Consultants
- Designer: Raffaele Cecco
- Composer: Jeroen Tel
- Platforms: Amiga, Atari ST, Amstrad CPC, Commodore 64, ZX Spectrum
- Release: 1988
- Genre: Shoot 'em up
- Mode: Single-player

Cybernoid II: The Revenge is a shoot 'em up released by Hewson Consultants in 1988 for the Amstrad CPC, Commodore 64, and ZX Spectrum home computers. It was later ported to the Atari ST and Amiga. It is the sequel to Cybernoid.

== Gameplay ==
Cybernoid II: The Revenge is similar to its predecessor, but with improved graphics and minor differences in gameplay. The player must pilot their fighter through multiple levels destroying pirate spacecraft while collecting gems and powerups.

== Reception ==
Reception

Awards
Publication	Award
Sinclair User	SU Classic
Your Sinclair	Megagame
Amstrad Action	Mastergame

- Sinclair User: "Excellent follow-up to a fine original shoot-em-up"
- Your Sinclair: "... a souped-up, all-new version of the bestest blaster we've seen on the [spectrum] this year..."
- Crash: "Not as stunning second time round, but still maintains the original's playability ... 88%"
