= Bram Stoker's Dracula (handheld video game) =

1993 video game

- North American cover art
- Developer: Probe Entertainment
- Publisher: Sony Imagesoft
- Artists: Richard Beston; Andrew McCarthy
- Composer: Jeroen Godfried Tel
- Platform: Game Boy
- Release: NA: September 1993; EU: November 26, 1993
- Genre: Action platformer
- Mode: Single-player

Bram Stoker's Dracula is a 1993 video game for the Game Boy developed by Probe Entertainment and released by Sony Imagesoft. It is a handheld port of the console video game of the same name, which is in turn based on the film Bram Stoker's Dracula directed by Francis Ford Coppola.

== Plot ==
The player controls a young lawyer named Jonathan Harker. Harker must free himself from Dracula's capture, follow him to London, and end his reign of terror.

== Gameplay ==
Armed with a knife, Jonathan Harker has to fight one of Dracula's minions.

While based on the 1992 film of the same name, the game had very little to do with the actual movie. Several weapons can be used; ranging from the basic knife to the advanced shotgun weapon.

The 16-bit renditions of the game were straightforward hack and slash games where players had to slash generic enemies in order to get to Dracula. There is a time limit that forces players to move quickly around the levels. Each chapter of the game starts off with a cover from a book. Checkpoints are used to maintain progress in a level after losing a life. Each level has a daytime and nighttime equivalent.

A boss appears at the end of each night time level in order to test the playing skills and to reinforce the concepts that were taught in the daytime version of the level.

Contrary to the source material, the gameplay bears a closer resemblance to platform games such as Super Mario Land than horror films.

== Reception ==
Reception

Review scores
Publication	Score
GamePro	4.5/5
GameZone	81/100

Bram Stoker's Dracula was voted to be the 21st worst video game of all time, according to FLUX magazine.
