= Technician Ted =

1984 video game

- Developers: Steve Marsden; David Cooke
- Publisher: Hewson Consultants
- Platforms: Amstrad CPC; ZX Spectrum
- Release: 1984
- Genre: Platform
- Mode: Single-player

Technician Ted (also known as The Chip Factory: Featuring Technician Ted) is a platform game for the Amstrad CPC and ZX Spectrum home computers that was written by Steve Marsden and David Cooke and published in 1984 by Hewson Consultants.

== Plot ==
Technician Ted is an enthusiastic young computer hacker who works at the chip factory. He begins his work every day at 8.30am and must complete 21 tasks before clocking off at 5.00pm, but his boss has not told him what the tasks are or where they are located. Ted speaks to his mate, who tells him that his first job is to get to his desk, and from there he must make his way to the "Silicon Slice Store".

== Gameplay ==
Technician Ted is a flick-screen platform game made up of many different named screens. On many of these screens there are two boxes which must be touched in the correct order (the first one will be flashing) in order to complete the task. Some of these tasks must be completed within a time-limit making it important for the player to guide Ted from one box to the other as quickly as possible.

As well as the tasks, Ted must avoid the various monsters that lurk in the factory and make sure he completes all of his tasks within the game's time limit so he can finish his day.

The in-game music is an adaptation of the Radetzky March by Johann Strauss Sr.

The Spectrum and Amstrad versions feature a sprite-animated loading screen with a countdown timer, a significant technical achievement at the time.

== Reception ==
Reception

Award
Publication	Award
Crash	Crash Smash

When reviewed in Crash magazine the game scored an overall 96%. When Technician Ted was reviewed by Your Sinclair magazine in 1985 it was awarded 6/10 although a review of the re-released game by the same magazine in 1989 awarded it 8/10. In 1992, it was placed at number 84 in the "Your Sinclair official top 100" list.

== Legacy ==
Technician Ted was followed by a sequel, Costa Capers, in 1985.

In 1986, Hewson published a special version of the game exclusively for 128K ZX Spectrums called Technician Ted - The Megamix. As well as featuring 100 extra rooms, this version also has three-channel chip music and the tasks have been numbered in order to make the order they are to be done in easier to understand.
