= Southern Belle (video game) =

1985 video game

- Developer: Hewson Consultants
- Designers: Mike Male; Bob Hillyer
- Platforms: Acorn Electron, Amstrad CPC, Amstrad PCW, BBC Micro, Commodore 64, ZX Spectrum
- Release: 1985
- Genre: Train simulator
- Mode: Single player

Southern Belle is a train simulation video game published by Hewson Consultants in 1985. Southern Belle was unique at the time of release in that it was the first 3D steam train simulator available for home computers. The game allows the user to take over the fireman and/or driver duties on a King Arthur class passenger steam locomotive on the London to Brighton line.

It was programmed by Mike Male, who teamed up with friend and railway buff Bob Hillyer.

== Gameplay ==
The aim of the game is to complete a simulated journey of the Southern Belle steam passenger train from London Victoria to Brighton while keeping to speed regulations, being careful not to derail when going around curves and completing the journey on time. There are various options available including a demonstration run, where the computer takes control of the locomotive, and a number of challenges such as beating the real record breaking run for that line, set on 26 July 1903 (at 48 minutes 41 seconds).

== Graphics ==
The graphics were "vector-style", but because of the limitations of the ZX Spectrum and such computers, the graphics were minimal. The framerate was very slow, updating only once per second. This was particularly notable when playing in "Fast" mode, where gameplay could be sped up x5 by pressing the "A" key. Also, the main gameplay screen lacked colour, with most versions being in monochrome. However, the ZX Spectrum version did include a "red" fire. Additionally, there were sections of line where there were no buildings visible in the foreground, leading to criticisms that the game looked as though the countryside had been hit by a nuclear bomb.

The game's demo mode was a high speed run, in homage to British Transport Films's classic London to Brighton in Four Minutes. The next station/tunnel's name appeared as a totem sign at the top of the screen (just after Gatwick Racecourse, it changed to Three Bridges and the lineside features passed in that section included three bridges).

== Sequels ==
Belle was followed up in 1987 with Evening Star, also published by Hewson and programmed by Mike Male and Bob Hillyer. Star is set on the old Somerset & Dorset line between Bath and Bournemouth.

== Reception ==
Your Sinclair reviewed Southern Belle in October 1985, giving an average rating of 5 out of 10. The reviewers felt that Belle made a welcome change from space games and had intuitive controls, but was ultimately lacking in excitement.

Electron User reviewed Southern Belle in May 1986, giving an overall score of 7 out of 10. The reviewer praised the title's originality but questioned if it could hold the attention of gamers who were not railway enthusiasts.

Zzap!64 reviewed Southern Belle in July 1986, giving an overall score of 88%. The reviewer concluded: "A superb simulation of a dull subject".
