= Octapolis (video game) =

1987 video game

- Publisher(s): English Software
- Designer(s): Jukka Tapanimäki
- Platform(s): Commodore 64
- Release: 1987
- Genre(s): Shoot 'em up, platform
- Mode(s): Single-player, multiplayer

Octapolis is a video game for the Commodore 64 written by Finnish game programmer Jukka Tapanimäki and published by English Software in 1987. The game is a hybrid between a shoot-'em-up and a platform game. The title comes from the eight cities in the game.

== Gameplay ==
Screenshot from the first level

Each of the eight cities contains a short shoot-'em-up part and a longer platform game part. The shoot-'em-up part includes two screens similar to Sanxion, one of which is a top-down view and the other is a side view. The game is played around a landing platform. The player's ship moves left or right automatically, and its speed can be adjusted. A sound effect tells the player when they can land on the platform and enter the platform game part. The better the player does on the shoot-'em-up part, the easier the platform game part will be.

The platform game part consists of a character resembling an astronaut moving around on single-screen (non-scrolling) rooms in which the character has to reach the exit. The character is armed with a raygun and can jump upwards or diagonally. Some enemies can be shot, some have to be avoided. The challenge is to shoot enemies well in advance and watch the movement patterns of unshootable enemies carefully to get past them. When enough rooms have been passed, the city is cleared. When all eight cities have been cleared, the game restarts with at a higher difficulty.

== Development ==
Octapolis was Tapanimäki's first commercial release. Its shoot-'em-up phase resembles Stavros Fasoulas's Sanxion, which inspired Tapanimäki to try designing games. Tapanimäki sent a demo of the game to several foreign publishers, of which Hewson, CRL and English Software replied with an offer about a publication contract. Tapanimäki agreed to English Software's contract, but the company went bankrupt soon after publishing Octapolis, which limited the distribution of Octapolis.

The music was composed by Wally Beben.

== Reception ==
Finnish magazine C-lehti rated the game five stars out of five.

== Sources ==
- Kuorikoski, Juho: Sinivalkoinen pelikirja - Suomen pelialan kronikka 1984-2014. Saarijärvi: Fobos Kustannus 2014. ISBN 978-952-67937-1-9.
- Saarikoski, Petri: Koneen lumo. Mikrotietokoneharrastus Suomessa 1970-luvulta 1990-luvun puoliväliin. Saarijärvi: Nykykulttuurin tutkimuskeskuksen julkaisuja 83, University of Jyväskylä 2004. ISBN 951-39-1948-X.
