= Quest Adventure =

1983 video game

- Publisher: Hewson Consultants
- Designer: Kim Topley
- Platform: ZX Spectrum
- Release: 1983
- Genre: Adventure

Quest Adventure is an adventure video game written by Kim Topley for the ZX Spectrum and published by Hewson Consultants in 1983.

== Gameplay ==
Quest Adventure is a game in which the player must locate a map and an ancient scroll.

== Reception ==
Daniel T Canavan reviewed Quest for Imagine magazine, giving positive remarks to its gameplay and said that adventure fans will enjoy this title.

Hewson expected players to be able to solve this game within six months, but 15-year old gamer Frazer Hubbard and his cousin solved Quest Adventure in only six weeks. Hubbard soon joined Crash's team of young reviewers for adventure games, and also helped launch an Adventurer's Help Line.
