= Evening Star (video game) =

1987 video game

- Publisher: Hewson Consultants
- Designers: Mike Male; Bob Hillyer
- Platforms: Acorn Electron, Amstrad CPC, BBC Micro, Commodore 64, ZX Spectrum
- Release: 1987
- Genre: Vehicle simulation
- Mode: Single-player

Evening Star is a vector graphics train simulation game for the ZX Spectrum, Commodore 64, BBC Micro, Acorn Electron, and Amstrad CPC published by Hewson Consultants in 1987. It is the sequel to Southern Belle.

== Gameplay ==
The idea of the game is to successfully get the "Evening Star" from Bath to its destination Bournemouth on the old Somerset and Dorset line. The objectives are keeping to the tight timetable, earning points for safety and economy, and obeying signals. Stops are made at stations along the route to pick up passengers.

== Reception ==
Reception

Review scores
Publication	Score
Computer and Video Games	7/10
Your Sinclair	8/10

Evening Star received positive reviews from critics. Bob Hillyer of The Games Machine praised the game's "fine-tuned" improvements on its predecessor, Southern Belle, citing its longer track and better graphics display. Computer & Video Games found the game's merits and flaws to be largely identical to Southern Belle, but highlighted the game's hazards, including the potential for derailment and collisions. Your Sinclair Magazine commended the game's attention to detail in its recreation of the rail line and the range of gameplay options and engine controls, but noted the game was "less than startling" in its monochrome graphical presentation.
