= Raffaele Cecco =

British video game developer (born 1967)

- Born: 10 May 1967 (age 59)
- Occupation: Video game programmer
- Writing career
- Period: 1984–
- Genre: Action games

Raffaele Cecco (born 10 May 1967) is a British video games developer who has created numerous video games since 1984, including Cybernoid and Exolon. He grew up in Tottenham in North London. Spurred by an interest in computers, he received his first computer, a Sinclair ZX81, as a birthday gift from his parents in 1981 and began programming simple games in BASIC.

Due to the popularity of Cecco's video games, he was asked to write a monthly diary for CRASH magazine, the first instalment being 15 April 1988. The diary documented the development of Stormlord.

== Games ==
These are the games that Cecco has developed or been closely associated with:

- Equinox (1986, Mikro-Gen)
- Exolon (1987, Hewson Consultants)
- Cybernoid (1988, Hewson Consultants)
- Stormlord (1989, Hewson Consultants)
- Deliverance: Stormlord II (1990, Hewson Consultants)
- First Samurai (1991, Vivid Image)
- Second Samurai (1993, Vivid Image)
- Street Racer (1994, Vivid Image)
- Agent Armstrong (1997, King of the Jungle)
- Invasion From Beyond (1998, King of the Jungle)
- Galaga: Destination Earth (2000, King of the Jungle)
- Championship Manager Quiz (2001, King of the Jungle)
- Grooverider: Slot Car Thunder (2003, King of the Jungle)

The Cecco's Collection compilation was released by Hewson in 1990. It includes Exolon, Cybernoid, Cybernoid II, and Stormlord. Your Sinclair awarded the compilation 92%, calling it a fine three-year collection of Cecco's achievements and a succinct history of Spectrum programming to that date. The reviewer, Andy Ide, considered Cecco one of the Spectrum's biggest stars.
