= Cybernoid =

1988 video game

Cybernoid: The Fighting Machine
- Developer: Raffaele Cecco
- Publishers: Hewson Consultants; Acclaim (NES)
- Designer: Raffaele Cecco
- Composers: Jeroen Tel; Jochen Hippel (ST); Dave Rogers (Spectrum, Amstrad)
- Platforms: ZX Spectrum, Amstrad CPC, Commodore 64, Atari ST, Amiga, NES
- Release: 1988: NA: December 1989 (NES)
- Genre: Shoot 'em up
- Mode: Single-player

Cybernoid: The Fighting Machine is a shoot 'em up developed and published in 1988 by Hewson Consultants for the ZX Spectrum. It was ported to the Amstrad CPC, Atari ST, Commodore 64, Amiga, and Nintendo Entertainment System. It was programmed by Raffaele Cecco. The ZX Spectrum, Amstrad, and Atari ST versions have a main theme by Dave Rogers, while the Commodore C64 version has a different theme by Jeroen Tel.

== Gameplay ==
In Cybernoid, pirates have raided the storage depots of the Federation and stolen minerals, jewels, ammunition and the latest battle weaponry. The Cybernoid ship has been dispatched with instructions to retrieve the stolen booty and to return it to storage within a specified time limit. The Cybernoid needs to battle the pirates and their planetary defense systems in order to retrieve the stolen booty.

Cybernoid is split into three levels, with each level consisting of several screens that are traversed via a flip-screen system of play rather than scrolling. The hazards in each screen can be different - some will have just enemy pirate ships, some homing missiles, some gun turrets, some indestructible enemies on fixed-paths that have to be traversed and some a mixture of these. The Cybernoid ship can collect power-ups for assistance (including a rear-gun and a giant spiked ball that flies around the ship) and also use a variety of built-in special weapons such as shields and homing missiles.

Shooting pirate ships often leaves power-ups or jewels that Cybernoid can then collect.

The NES version was made by Studio 12 productions, consisting of Chris Harvey as the programmer and Adrian Carless for the graphics. They put a few in-jokes into the title page, the main one being that the Cybernoid ship was designed by "M.Sugden", referencing the British actress Mollie Sugden, who played Mrs Slocombe on the TV series Are You Being Served?.

== Reception ==
Reception

Awards
| Publication | Award |
|---|---|
| Crash | Crash Smash |
| Sinclair User | SU Classic |
| Your Sinclair | Megagame |
| Amstrad Action | Mastergame |

Cybernoid achieved great critical success. CRASH magazine awarded an overall score of 96%, with one reviewer exclaiming: "Fantastic! Who needs 16-bit machines when Hewson and Raffaele Cecco can produce games like this on the 8-bit Spectrum?", referring to the smooth animation and addictive gameplay.

Your Sinclair also awarded the game 9 out of 10, the reviewer also highlighting the excellent graphics, fast gameplay and the fact that tactics are required to pass each screen. The game was voted number 36 in the Your Sinclair Official Top 100 Games of All Time.

== Legacy ==
A sequel, titled Cybernoid II: The Revenge, was published the following year on the Amiga, Amstrad CPC, Atari ST, Commodore 64 and ZX Spectrum. In 2004 it was one of the games featured on the C64 Direct-to-TV. The plot of the sequel revolves around the return of the pirates in a new Battlestar, again plundering Federation storage depots.

In October 2018, the game's rights were acquired by Canadian production company Liquid Media Group along with other titles originally owned by Acclaim Entertainment.
