= Steve Turner (game programmer) =

British video game musician

- Born: 1954; 72 years ago
- Occupations: computer game musician designer

Steve Turner is a former computer game musician and designer. His development team, Graftgold, mostly wrote for games published by Hewson Consultants during the 1980s.

The first computer he bought was a ZX80 which had to be assembled by hand. At school he was a member of a computing club where he learnt the Algol 60 programming language. During the 1970s he added Cobol to his repertoire from a government funded training course. He went on to a programming job in the Civil Service. Turner was 30 when he decided to move into games development. His first game was written whilst he was still employed as a programmer and he handed his notice in when he received his first royalty cheque.

He also wrote a series of articles for ZX Computing between August 1986 and January 1987, called The Professional Touch. Andrew Hewson had previously written for the magazine but got too busy to do it and Turner replaced him.

In 2025, after 30 years of hiatus, he came back to videogame development with the space ship simulator Deepest Blue.

== List of games ==
For Hewson Consultants:

- 3D Space Wars (1983)
- 3D Seiddab Attack (1984)
- 3D Lunattack (1984)
- Avalon (1984)
- Dragontorc (1985)
- Astroclone (1985)
- Uridium (1986) (music)
- Alleykat (1986) (music)
- Quazatron (1986)
- Ranarama (1987)
- Zynaps (1987) (music)
- Magnetron (1988)
- Bushido (1989) (design)
- Rainbow Island (1990) (design)
- Simulcra (1990) (design and sound effects)
- Super Off Road (1990) (design)

For Graftgold:

- Deepest Blue (2025)
