= Eliminator (1988 video game) =

1988 shooter video game

- Cover artwork by Steve Weston
- Developer: Linel
- Publisher: Hewson Consultants
- Platforms: Amiga, Amstrad CPC, Atari ST, Commodore 64, ZX Spectrum
- Release: 1988
- Genre: Shoot 'em up

Eliminator is a 3D shoot 'em up for home computers published in 1988 by Hewson Consultants.

== Reception ==
Reception

Award
Publication	Award
Your Sinclair	YS Megagame

Info gave the game 4 stars.
