= Netherworld (video game) =

1988 video game

- Cover art
- Developer: Jukka Tapanimäki
- Publisher: Hewson Consultants
- Designer: Jukka Tapanimäki
- Platforms: Commodore 64 (original); Amiga, Amstrad CPC, Atari ST, MS-DOS, ZX Spectrum
- Release: 1988
- Genre: Shoot 'em up
- Mode: Single-player

Netherworld is a shoot 'em up video game published by Hewson in 1988. It was originally developed by Jukka Tapanimäki for the Commodore 64, and original music was composed by Jori Olkkonen.

== Summary ==
The object is to fly a small spacecraft and collect the required number of diamonds in each level. Once enough diamonds are collected, the craft must reach a teleporter to go to the next level before the time runs out. Aside from the time limit, there are various obstacles, ranging from monsters to items which can damage the craft or block the path. The ship can destroy some obstacles by shooting, sometimes turning them into diamonds as well.

The cover image, that features Tapanimäki's face, was produced from a photograph of the programmer without his knowledge and approval. The original design, depicting a dwarf at the gates of hell, had been shelved following a dispute between Hewson and the original cover artist. Tapanimäki did not see the final version produced by Hewson's local artist, Steve Weston, until the press conference in London when the game was released.

Cheat codes published in gaming magazines which only worked in an earlier version of the code indicated that a development version of the game had leaked to pirates some six months before the release.

== Reception ==
Reception

Award
| Publication | Award |
|---|---|
| Amstrad Action | Mastergame |

The Spanish magazine Microhobby awarded the game the following scores: Originality: 80% Graphics: 80% Motion: 80% Sound: 80% Difficulty: 100% Addiction: 100%
