= Simulcra =

1990 video game

- Developer: Graftgold
- Publisher: MicroStyle
- Programmers: Andrew Braybrook; Steve Turner
- Platforms: Amiga, Atari ST
- Release: EU: 1990
- Genre: Third-person shooter
- Mode: Single-player

Simulcra is a 1990 computer game for the Amiga and Atari ST developed by Graftgold published by MicroStyle. A 3D polygonal third-person shooter, the player controls an attack craft which can switch between ground-based and aerial attack modes, traversing a wireframe virtual environment.

== See also ==
- Zarch
