= Zynaps =

1987 video game

- Amiga cover
- Developers: Dominic Robinson; John Cumming; Stephen Crow; Steve Turner
- Publisher: Hewson Consultants
- Platforms: Amiga, Amstrad CPC, Atari ST, C64, ZX Spectrum
- Release: 8-bit: 1987; 16-bit: 1988
- Genre: Shoot 'em up
- Modes: Single-player, multiplayer

Zynaps is a side-scrolling shoot 'em up video game published by Hewson Consultants for the ZX Spectrum, Amstrad CPC and Commodore 64 in 1987 and for the Atari ST in 1988 and the Amiga.

It was authored by Dominic Robinson, John Cumming and Stephen Crow, with music by Steve Turner. The graphics for the Atari ST and Amiga versions were developed by Pete Lyon.

Dominic Robinson and Steve Turner had previously worked on the ZX Spectrum version of Uridium.

== Description ==
Zynaps is a 2D scrolling shooter game in which the player's task is to get through 14 levels with a spaceship, shoot waves of hostile attack formations, collect weapons, and not get caught. At the end of each level, after waiting, as is tradition, an end boss awaits that needs to be defeated to progress to the next section. After every section, the difficulty of the next section is increased.

The players start with three spaceships and get the first extra ship with 10000 points; after that, they get a new spaceship every 20000 points.

If the players lose a life, they automatically get sent back to the beginning of the level, no matter how far they proceed.

== Critical reaction ==
Reception

Awards
| Publication | Award |
|---|---|
| Crash | Crash Smash |
| Sinclair User | SU Classic |

The ZX Spectrum version of Zynaps was reviewed in the August 1987 issue of Your Sinclair, receiving 9/10 and being described as "smooth and slick". CRASH magazine awarded it a CRASH Smash in issue 42. The game also won the award for best shooting game of the year according to the readers of Crash.
