= Dragontorc =

1985 video game

- Developer: Graftgold
- Publisher: Hewson Consultants
- Designer: Steve Turner
- Platforms: Amstrad CPC, ZX Spectrum
- Release: EU: 1985
- Genre: Action-adventure
- Mode: Single-player

Dragontorc is an action-adventure game developed by Steve Turner's Graftgold and released for the Amstrad CPC and ZX Spectrum by Hewson Consultants in 1985. It is a sequel to 1984's Avalon The 3D Adventure Movie. The hero of Avalon, Maroc the Mage, returns to defeat an evil witch and save Britain. The game was well received by critics.

== Plot ==
Maroc the Mage has defeated the Lord of Chaos, but now he must stop Morag the Shape-Shifter, the Witch Queen of the North, from inheriting the power of the legendary Dragontorc of Avalon. To reactivate it and achieve her evil ambitions, Morag needs to gather the five crowns of the kingdoms of Britain. She has manipulated the Saxons to fight against the kings so she can steal the five crowns, and has already caused the death of King Vortigern and seized the crown of Dumnonia. To save the realm, Maroc sets out to seek out and destroy the remaining crowns, infiltrate the citadel of Morag to find and kill her, and free the Merlyn, his mentor who has been enchanted by Morag.

== Reception ==
Reception

Award
Publication	Award
Crash	Smash!

The game was overall well received. Amstrad Action gave it an 86%, Amtix gave it a 91%, Popular Computing Weekly gave it five (for the original Spectrum version) and four (for the Amstrad port) TV sets out of five, and ZX Computing gave it five stars out of five. Clare Edgeley of Sinclair User wrote: "Avalon fans will love Dragontorc, which is more user friendly. The puzzles are well hidden and tricky. If you have never played Avalon, however, start with Dragontorc, it is the better game". A review in Crash hailed it for "an excellent balance of incentive and difficulty", and praised its "excellent" graphics but had some criticism for the sound despite commending its "great" music and awarded it a score of 92%. In 1991, Crash staff ranked Dragontorc as the 99th top Spectrum game.
