= Uridium 2 =

1993 video game

- Developer: Andrew Braybrook
- Publisher: Renegade Software
- Designer: Andrew Braybrook
- Programmer: Andrew Braybrook
- Artists: Mark Bentley; Stephen Rushbrook; Colin Seaman; Simon Sheridan
- Composer: Jason Page
- Platform: Amiga
- Release: 1993
- Genre: Scrolling shooter
- Modes: Single-player, double player, double player team

Uridium 2 is a science fiction themed, horizontally scrolling shooter designed and programmed by Andrew Braybrook for the Amiga. It was published by Renegade Software in 1993. Uridium 2 is the sequel to Braybrook's Commodore 64 game Uridium. Braybrook kept a diary of the game's development in late 1992, which was published in the British computer magazine The One.

== Gameplay ==
Screenshot from the first level

Uridium 2 retains the same setting and gameplay of the original Uridium, but the presentation is highly improved, thanks to the Amiga's advanced graphics and sound capabilities. The sprites and background objects are more detailed and more colourful, the game scrolls vertically as well as horizontally, and the sound includes a souped-up version of the original Uridium theme tune, as well as PCM sampled speech (voiced by Emma Cubberley) announcing important in-game events.

Gameplay improvements include a simultaneous two-player mode, power-ups left behind by shooting enemies, a radar screen at the bottom of the game screen, and an improved mini-game when the player reaches the dreadnought's reactor core: instead of a simple quick-draw test to disarm the reactor, the player now gets to actually shoot at the reactor core using a drone pilot. In addition, the play area is greatly increased due to the larger size of the dreadnoughts and the addition of vertical scrolling.
