= Morpheus (1987 video game) =

- Cover art
- Developer(s): Graftgold
- Publisher(s): Rainbird
- Designer(s): Andrew Braybrook
- Platform(s): Commodore 64
- Release: 1987
- Genre(s): Shoot 'em up
- Mode(s): Single-player or two players

Morpheus is a 1987 shoot 'em up developed by Graftgold for the Commodore 64 and published by Rainbird. The game's designer, Andrew Braybrook, wrote a series of articles on the game's creation for the magazine Zzap!64 over eight months.

== Gameplay ==
Morpheus features 50 subuniverses called Aithers, each of which consists of a central Nucleus surrounded by obstacles called Orbitals. The aim of the game is for players to break through the obstacles to destroy the Nucleus, and by the end of level 50, Morpheus as a whole. Players will also encounter enemies such as Morphii and aliens which can be killed for points. Morpheus allows players to use points earned to purchase weapons, and customize various features of their ships, such as auxiliary weapons and expansion ports to allow various gameplay possibilities.

== Reception ==
Zzap!64 magazine positively reviewed the game and awarded it a Sizzler rating with an overall score of 90%. They described it as "without a doubt one of the most finely constructed games ever written for the 64". The graphics were praised, but reviewers noted that the gameplay style significantly departed from Braybrook's previous games. Reviewers recommended that readers try the game before purchasing. Although technically accomplished, it might not appeal to everyone. Commodore User were also enthusiastic about the game, saying it "reeks of quality". Their only criticism was the lack of a game save and load facility. They gave it a 9 out of 10 rating.

Andy Smith of Advanced Computer Entertainment said the game "can become very enthralling" but was "tough to get into". They felt it was "a good, entertaining game" but noted "the repetitive nature of the task could see your interest dying sooner than it might have". They gave the game an overall rating of 772 out of 1000.

Computer and Video Games' reviewer was less enthusiastic about the game, commending its originality, but calling its gameplay "extremely laborious". The reviewer believed the music and sound effects were the best thing about the game, saying it was "visually very good". They advised potential purchasers to try the game first. It was rated 7/10.
