= Avalon (video game) =

1984 video game

- Cover art
- Developer: Steve Turner
- Publisher: Hewson Consultants
- Designer: Steve Turner
- Platform: ZX Spectrum
- Release: EU: 1984
- Genre: Action-adventure
- Mode: Single-player

Avalon (with the tagline The 3D Adventure Movie on the box cover) is an action-adventure game written by Steve Turner for the ZX Spectrum and published by Hewson Consultants in 1984. Avalon was followed by a sequel in 1985, Dragontorc.

== Plot ==
Avalon is set in Britain in the year 408, during the collapse of the Western Roman Empire. The player controls Maroc, a "lore-seeker" who has been given a staff and map by a strange old woman and pointed in the direction of a place called Glass Hill on the isle of Avalon, where a quest to defeat the Lord of Chaos begins.

== Gameplay ==
Avalon involves controlling Maroc the mage in his quest to destroy Avelach, Lord of Chaos. The player's character cannot be killed. The game world is explored by an astral projection of Maroc; if Maroc's energy is depleted the projection returns to Maroc's "physical" body on the start screen, from which the game can be continued.

== Reception ==
Reception

Awards
Publication	Award
Crash	Crash Smash
C+VG	Game of the Month

The game was well received and attained numerous awards from critics.

- 91% (CRASH #10, November 1984).
- Home Computing Weekly
- Sinclair User
- Computer and Video Games
- Eurogamer.net
- Personal Computer Games
- MicroHobby
