= Gribbly's Day Out =

1985 video game

- Developer: Andrew Braybrook
- Publisher: Hewson Consultants
- Designer: Andrew Braybrook
- Platforms: C64, Acorn Archimedes
- Release: 1985
- Genre: Action
- Mode: Single-player

Gribbly's Day Out is a Commodore 64 game by Andrew Braybrook, released by Hewson in 1985. It was written over a three-month period. The game is set on the planet Blabgor and centred on the exploits of Gribbly Grobbly and his attempts to rescue errant 'gribblets' from the landscape and return them to safety. A revised version was released on the Rack-It budget label.

== The heroes ==
Blabgorians possess the gift of psychic ability which allow them to levitate and move items with their minds, and as a result they evolved without hands (as they do not need them), a single foot (good for bouncing) and an oversized head (handy for containing large quantities of psychic energy). Gribbly Grobbly is a typical Blabgorian, and is tasked with the safety of the 'gribblets'.

'Gribblets' are infant Blabgorians; they have an armoured shell to protect them, but when flipped on their backs they expose their vulnerable belly and are unable to right themselves. They also have a tendency to leave the safety of home in search of adventure. Blabgor however is not a safe place; there are hordes of beasts roaming the landscape, eagerly searching for vulnerable Gribblets.

== The Beasts ==
Seed Pods
With a resemblance to sycamore seeds, seed pods fly around the landscape. They are relatively harmless, though they hurt Gribbly when he collides with them. They are vulnerable to bubbles and are easily disposed of, however once they touch the ground they turn into Topsies.

Topsies
These mutated seed pods resemble worms with a suction cup on each end. They move backwards and forwards along the ground seeking out gribblets. When a gribblet is found, the Topsie flips the gribblet onto its back, making it vulnerable. They can still be killed by bubbles and hurt when touched. After a period of roaming the landscape, Topsies stop moving and encase themselves in a chrysalis.

Chrysalis
These do not move and can be destroyed by bubbles, but if left unattended too long, they hatch into Stompers.

Stompers
These resemble armoured Topsies. They cannot be killed by bubbles, but are susceptible to water and drown easily. If a Stomper encounters an overturned Gribblet, it absorbs the helpless creature and mutates yet again into a Flier.

Fliers
These are the final stage of evolution. They are susceptible to bubbles again and when killed they release the Gribblet used to create them, but gravity quickly takes over and this freedom will be short lived unless the Gribblet falls onto flat ground or is caught in mid-air.

== The energy web ==
Another challenge is a large energy web, which covers large portions of the landscape and needs to be navigated carefully. Contact with the web is harmful, but certain sections of the web may be turned on and off to allow travel around the landscape. It was created to contain Seon, a mutated Blabgorian who was corrupted when he absorbed evil psi-energy. He was deemed insane and thought too dangerous to be free, so the web was meant to keep him out of trouble.

== The game ==
Gribbly can hop and levitate around each of the levels and can blow bubbles to defend himself. Once a Gribblet is located, Gribbly can pick up the hapless offspring and carry it to safety. Once only a single Gribblet remains on a level, the energy web fails, freeing Seon. This usually results in a mad rush to get the remaining Gribblet to safety before succumbing to his attacks. Once all the Gribblets are either saved or killed, the level ends and Gribbly is transported to the next level.

== Ports ==
A port by Coin-Age to the Acorn Archimedes (titled Gribbly's Day Out on the Arc) was released in 1992.
