= Magnetron (video game) =

1988 video game

- Publisher: Broderbund
- Platform: Commodore 64
- Release: 1988
- Genre: Space combat simulator

Magnetron is a 1988 video game published by Broderbund.

== Gameplay ==
Magnetron is a game in which the player is a Photon fighter pilot whose mission is to destroy walled fortresses in the Magnetron Galaxy.

== Reception ==
David M. Wilson for Computer Gaming World gave a positive review to the game and highlighted "Galaxy Editor", a program in which the players "design their own Galaxy and build their own fortress", as its strength.
