= Hewson Consultants =

Company

- Industry: Video game
- Founded: 1982; United Kingdom
- Headquarters: United Kingdom

Hewson Consultants were one of the smaller software companies which produced video games for home computers in the mid-1980s. They had a reputation for high-quality games, and are ranked seventh out of 109 companies reviewed by Your Sinclair with an average rating of 84%. Fourteen of their games were awarded "Megagame" by Your Sinclair, and Paradroid is considered one of the best games ever released for the Commodore 64.

Hewson was founded by Andrew Hewson in the early 1980s. He became interested in computers while working at the British Museum when their first machine arrived. After learning to program, Andrew wrote the programming guide book Hints and Tips for the ZX80. Following the publication, bedroom coders began to send Andrew the games they had programmed on cassette tape, giving him the idea to publish the games. Hewson Consultants was born, and initially released games via mail order advertisements in computing magazines. Andrew was also a columnist in Sinclair User magazine throughout the 1980s.

== Releases ==
- Space Intruders - 1981 - Space Invaders clone for the ZX81
- Pilot - 1982
- Nightflite - 1982
- Heathrow Air Traffic Control - 1983
- Nightflite II - 1983
- Knight Driver - 1983
- Quest Adventure - 1983
- 3D Space-Wars - 1983
- 3D Seiddab Attack - 1984
- 3D Lunattack - 1984 - Reviewed in Crash issue 4 - 90%
- Avalon - 1984 - Reviewed in Crash issue 10 - 91%
- Technician Ted - 1984 - Reviewed in Crash issue 13 - 96%
- Dragontorc - 1985
- Astro Clone - 1985
- Paradroid - 1985
- Gribbly's Day Out - 1985
- Firelord - 1986
- Pyracurse - 1986
- Quazatron - 1986
- Southern Belle - 1986
- Uridium - 1986
- Technician Ted: The Megamix - 1986
- Cybernoid - 1987
- Exolon - 1987
- Zynaps - 1987
- Impossaball - 1987
- Nebulus - 1987
- Ranarama - 1987
- Evening Star - 1987
- Anarchy - 1987
- Netherworld - 1988
- Cybernoid II: The Revenge - 1988
- Marauder - 1988
- Zamzara - 1988
- Eliminator - 1988
- Battle Valley - 1988
- Steel - 1989
- Stormlord - 1989
- Astaroth - 1989
- Onslaught - 1989
- Deliverance - 1990
- Insects in Space - 1990
- Zarathrusta - 1991

== Legacy ==
Andrew and other members of the Hewson management team went on to form 21st Century Entertainment after Hewson shut down in the early 1990s, releasing several games such as Pinball Dreams, Pinball Fantasies and Pinball Illusions. Andrew was also the founder of ELSPA (European Leisure Software Publishers Association) which continues to be the European regulating body for the video games industry.
