= Colorado (disambiguation) =

Colorado is a state located in the southwestern United States.

Colorado may also refer to:

== Geography ==
=== Rivers ===
- Colorado River in the western United States and Mexico that passes through the Grand Canyon
- Colorado River (Texas) in Texas in the United States
- Colorado River (Argentina)

=== Towns and cities ===
- Colorado, Mitchells Plain, City of Cape Town, South Africa
- Colorado, Paraná, Brazil
- Colorado, Rio Grande do Sul, Brazil
- Colorado, Texas, US
- Colorado City, Colorado, US
- Colorado City, Texas, US
- Colorado Springs, Colorado, US
- Alto Colorado, Pichilemu, Chile

=== Other places ===
- The University of Colorado at Boulder, a public research university located in Boulder, Colorado
- Colorado County, Texas
- Colorado Desert in California
- Colorado Plateau, physiographic region in Western United States
- Colorados Archipelago, chain of isles and cays on Cuba's north-western coast
- Colorado Group, a geologic classification in the Great Plains of North America
- Los Colorados Formation, near La Rioja, Argentina
- The French Colorado, near Rustrel in Provence-Alpes-Côte d'Azur, France

== Sports ==
- Colorado Buffaloes, sports teams from the University of Colorado
- Sports in Colorado, any sports team from Colorado
- Colorado (horse) (1923–1929), British Thoroughbred racehorse
- A nickname for Sport Club Internacional, a Brazilian football team

== Transportation ==
- Chevrolet Colorado, a pickup truck manufactured by GM
  - Holden Colorado, a rebadged Chevrolet Colorado for the Australian market
- The USS Colorado, a number of ships built by the United States
- Colorado station, a side platformed RTD light rail station in Denver, Colorado, United States
- 40th & Colorado station, a side platformed RTD commuter rail station in Denver, Colorado, United States

== Arts and entertainment ==
- Colorado (1915 film), a silent western film directed by Thomas Doyle, with Hobart Bosworth
- Colorado (1921 film), a silent western film directed by B. Reeves Eason
- Colorado (1940 film), an American Western film directed by Joseph Kane and starring Roy Rogers
- Colorado (card game), a solitaire card game
- Colorado (video game), a 1990 French video game

=== Music ===
- Los Colorados, a Ukrainian polka band
- Colorado (Kabát album), 1994
- Colorado (Neil Young album), 2019
- "Colorado" (Xandra song), 1979
- "Colorado" (Mikolas Josef song), 2019
- "Colorado" (Milky Chance song), 2021
- "Colorado" (Reneé Rapp song), 2022
- "Colorado" (Johnny Drille song), 2026

== Other uses ==
- Territory of Colorado (California), a proposed US territory
- Colorado Group, an Australian clothing chain
- The Colorado language, spoken in Ecuador
- Colorado low, a meteorological term
- Colorado Party (Paraguay), a political party in Paraguay
- Colorado Party (Uruguay), a political party in Uruguay
- Colorado Trading & Clothing, a US clothing chain based in Denver, Colorado
- Bolivian Colorados Regiment, commonly known as "Los Colorados de Bolivia", a prestigious infantry regiment of the Bolivian Army
- Colorados (kolorady), a negative term for Russian extreme patriots and militants, after the resemblance of the Colorado potato beetle's coloration to the Ribbon of Saint George

== See also ==
- Cerro Colorado (disambiguation)
