= Ishar 2: Messengers of Doom =

1993 video game

- Developer(s): Silmarils
- Publisher(s): EU: Silmarils; UK: Daze Marketing (Note: Amiga, Atari ST, and MS-DOS versions.)
- Director(s): André Rocques
- Designer(s): Michel Pernot; Pascal Einsweiler
- Programmer(s): André Rocques; Fabrice Hautecloque; Michel Pernot
- Artist(s): Pascal Einsweiler
- Writer(s): André Rocques; Louis-Marie Rocques; Michel Pernot
- Composer(s): Fabrice Hautecloque
- Series: Ishar
- Engine: ALIS (Note: Short for Actor Language Integrated System.)
- Platform(s): Amiga, Atari ST, MS-DOS, Atari Falcon, Macintosh
- Release: Amiga, Atari ST, MS-DOS: EU: April 1993; UK: May–June 1993 (ST); UK: July 1993 (Amiga); Atari Falcon: EU: 1993; Macintosh: FRA: 1994
- Genre(s): Role-playing game
- Mode(s): Single-player

Ishar 2: Messengers of Doom is a 1993 role-playing video game developed and published by Silmarils for the Amiga, Atari ST, MS-DOS, Atari Falcon, and Macintosh home computers. It is the second entry in the Ishar trilogy.

== Gameplay ==
Atari ST version screenshot

The party from Ishar: Legend of the Fortress can be imported to the sequel. The party consists maximum of five persons. When recruiting party members, race and personality traits have to be considered since all characters don't get along with each other. Compared to the previous game, the game world is three times bigger, and the interface has been rearranged and streamlined. The game can be controlled entirely with a mouse. The combat is in real-time.

== Plot ==
An evil wizard has made a drug that poisons the people of Arborea. The drug causes hallucinations and makes them accept the wizard as ruler. The party's objective is to travel through the game's seven islands and stop the wizard.

== Development and release ==
GOG.com released an emulated version for Windows in 2009.

== Reception ==
Reception

Review scores
Publication	Score
Aktueller Software Markt	50/60 (DOS)
Amiga Action	79%
Computer and Video Games	87% (Amiga)
ST Format	92%
CU Amiga	93% (1993); 88% (1995)
Génération 4	82% (DOS/ST); 80% (Amiga); 85% (Amiga 1200)

Amiga Action called the game "a good solid RPG" but said it lacks originality. CU Amiga called the game "a must buy" and "an astounding sequel". In a re-review CU Amiga said Ishar 2 is the best game in the trilogy. ST Format said the game is "an absorbing and atmospheric challenge". Computer and Video Games called it one of the best Amiga games of the year. Génération 4 compared the Amiga and Atari ST versions to the DOS version and said Amiga/ST version has fewer colours (16) and the ST version has comparable sound, and Amiga version has better sound with an Ad Lib card. The Amiga 1200 version was said to be equivalent to the DOS version.
