= Open world =

Type of video game design

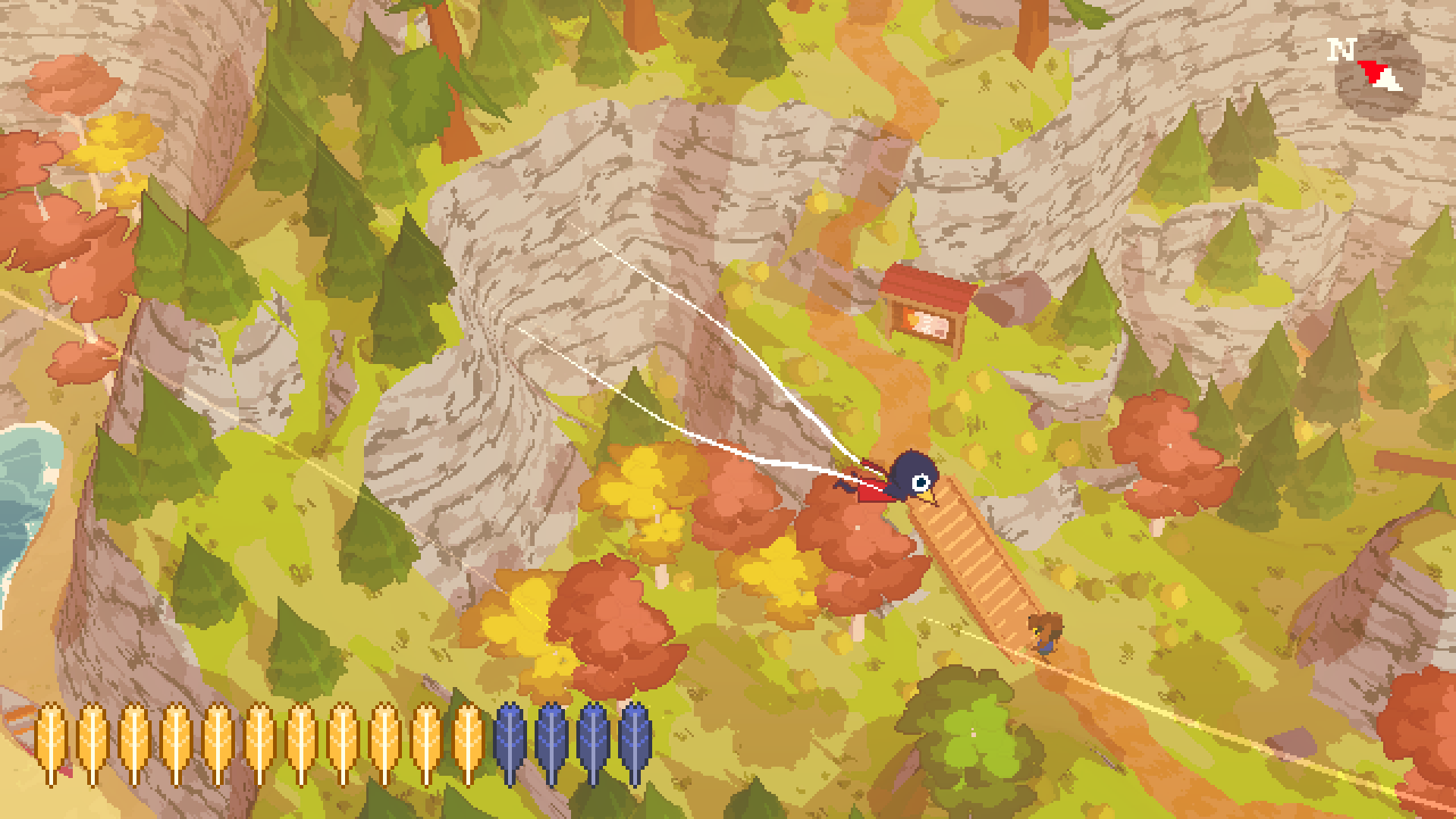
Screenshot of the 2019 video game A Short Hike, in which the player can freely explore the game world

In video games, an open world is a virtual world in which the player can approach objectives freely, as opposed to a world with more linear and structured gameplay. Notable games in this category include Grand Theft Auto: San Andreas (2004), The Legend of Zelda: Breath of the Wild (2017), Red Dead Redemption 2 (2018), and Minecraft (2011).

Games with open or free-roaming worlds typically lack level structures like walls and locked doors, or the invisible walls in more open areas that prevent the player from venturing beyond them; only at the bounds of an open-world game will players be limited by geographic features like vast oceans or impassable mountains. Players typically do not encounter loading screens common in linear level designs when moving about the game world, with the open-world game using strategic storage and memory techniques to load the game world dynamically and seamlessly. Open-world games still enforce many restrictions in the game environment, either because of absolute technical limitations or in-game limitations imposed by a game's linearity.

While the openness of the game world is an important facet to games featuring open worlds, the main draw of open-world games is about providing the player with autonomy—not so much the freedom to do anything they want in the game (which is nearly impossible with current computing technology), but the ability to choose how to approach the game and its challenges in the order and manner as the player desires while still constrained by gameplay rules. Examples of high level of autonomy in computer games can be found in massively multiplayer online role-playing games (MMORPG) or in single-player games adhering to the open-world concept such as the Fallout series. The main appeal of open-world gameplay is that it provides a simulated reality and allows players to develop their character and its behavior in the direction and pace of their own choosing. In these cases, there is often no concrete goal or end to the game, although there may be the main storyline, such as with games like The Elder Scrolls V: Skyrim.

== Gameplay and design ==
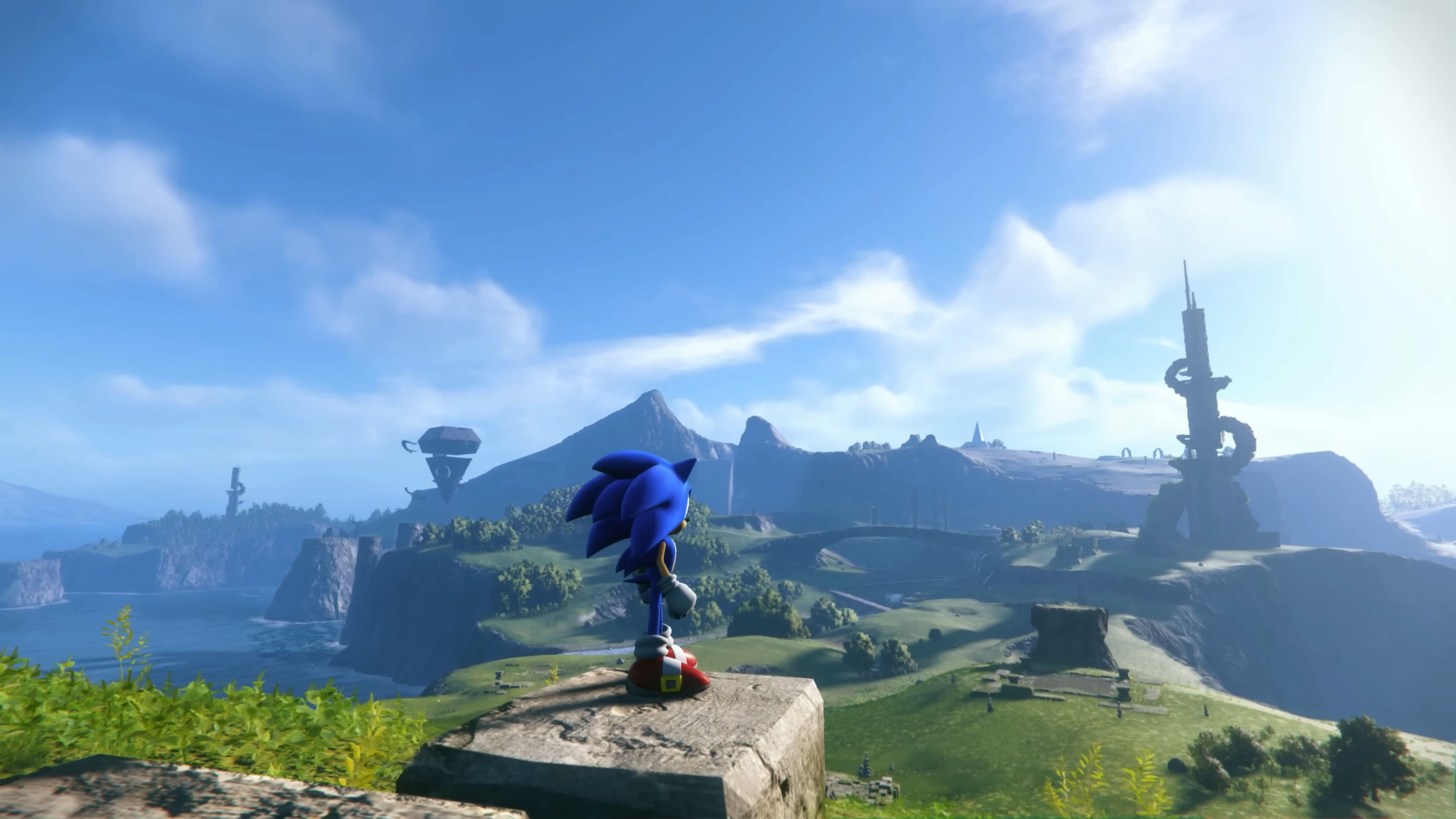
Sonic Frontiers, an open world 3D platformer

An open world is a level or game designed as nonlinear, open areas with many ways to reach an objective. Some games are designed with both traditional and open-world levels. An open world facilitates greater exploration than a series of smaller levels, or a level with more linear challenges. Reviewers have judged the quality of an open world based on whether there are interesting ways for the player to interact with the broader level when they ignore their main objective. Some games use real settings to model an open world, such as New York City.

A major design challenge is to balance the freedom of an open world with the structure of a dramatic storyline. Since players may perform actions that the game designer did not expect, the game's writers must find creative ways to impose a storyline on the player without interfering with their freedom. As such, games with open worlds will sometimes break the game's story into a series of missions, or have a much simpler storyline altogether. Other games instead offer side-missions to the player that do not disrupt the main storyline. Most open-world games make the character a blank slate that players can project their own thoughts onto, although several games such as Landstalker: The Treasures of King Nole offer more character development and dialogue. Writing in 2005, David Braben described the narrative structure of current video games as "little different to the stories of those Harold Lloyd films of the 1920s", and considered open-ended stories to be the "Holy Grail" for the fifth generation of gaming. Gameplay designer Manveer Heir, who worked on Mass Effect 3 and Mass Effect: Andromeda for Electronic Arts, said that there are difficulties in the design of an open-world game since it is difficult to predict how players will approach solving gameplay challenges offered by a design, in contrast to a linear progression, and needs to be a factor in the game's development from its onset. Heir opined that some of the critical failings of Andromeda were due to the open world being added late in development.

Some open-world games, to guide the player towards major story events, do not provide the world's entire map at the start of the game, but require the player to complete a task to obtain part of that map, often identifying missions and points of interest when they view the map. This has been derogatorily referred to as "Ubisoft towers", as this mechanic was promoted in Ubisoft's Assassin's Creed series (the player climbing a large tower as to observe the landscape around it and identify waypoints nearby) and reused in other Ubisoft games, including Far Cry, Might & Magic X: Legacy, and Watch Dogs. Other games that use this approach include Middle-earth: Shadow of Mordor, The Legend of Zelda: Breath of the Wild, and Marvel's Spider-Man. Rockstar games like Grand Theft Auto: San Andreas and Grand Theft Auto IV lock out sections of the map as "barricaded by law enforcement" until a specific point in the story has been reached.

Games with open worlds typically give players infinite lives or continues, although some force the player to start from the beginning should they die too many times. There is also a risk that players may get lost as they explore an open world; thus designers sometimes try to break the open world into manageable sections. The scope of open-world games requires the developer to fully detail every possible section of the world the player may be able to access, unless methods like procedural generation are used. The design process, due to its scale, may leave numerous game world glitches, bugs, incomplete sections, or other irregularities that players may find and potentially take advantage of. The term "open world jank" has been used to apply to games where the incorporation of the open world gameplay elements may be poor, incomplete, or unnecessary to the game itself such that these glitches and bugs become more apparent, though are generally not game-breaking, such as the case for No Man's Sky near its launch.

=== Distinctions between open world and sandbox games ===
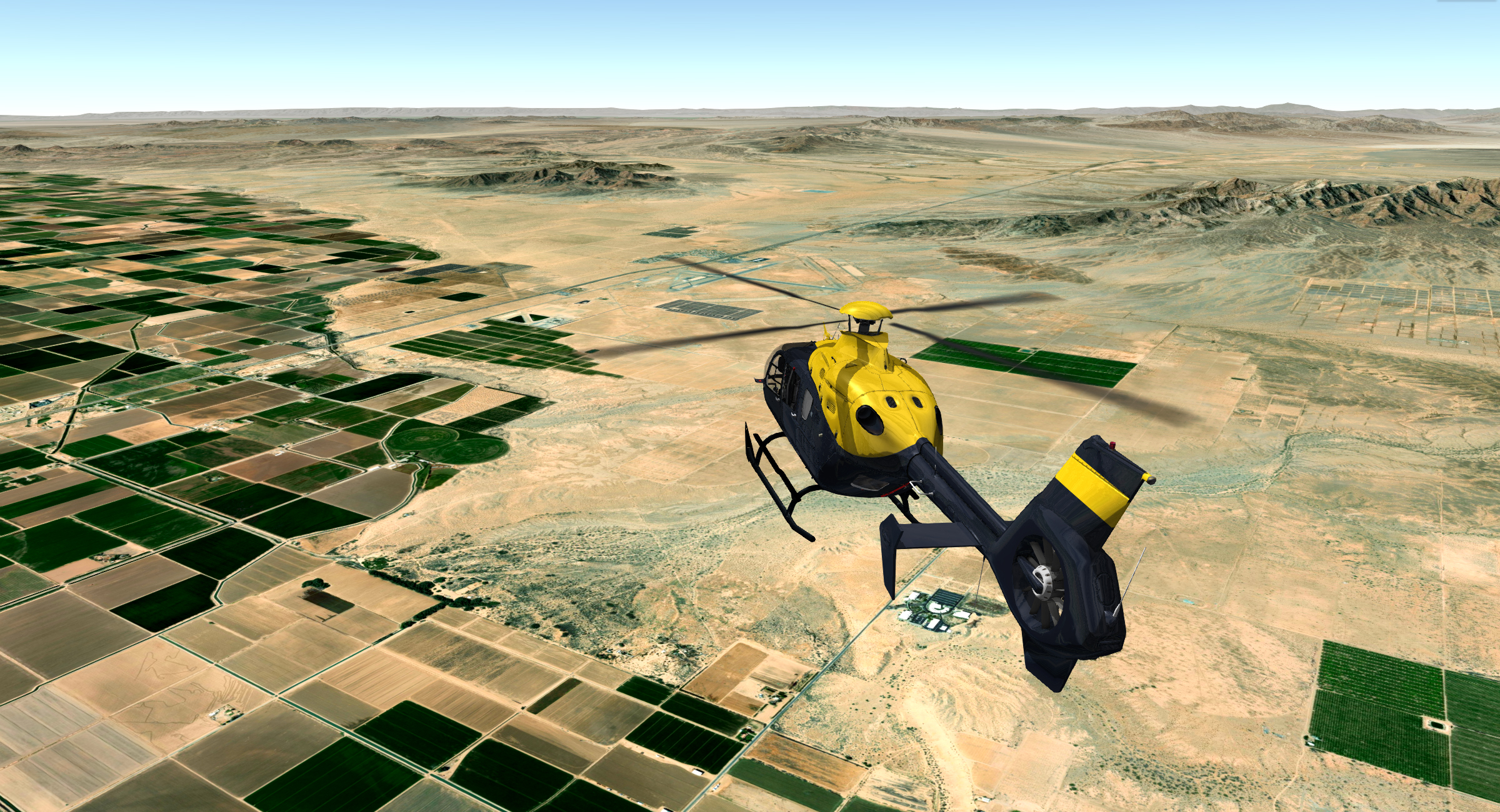
Open world flight simulator GeoFS

The mechanics of open-world games are often overlapped with ideas of sandbox games, but these are considered different concepts. Whereas open world refers to the lack of limits for the player's exploration of the game's world, sandbox games are based on the ability of giving the player tools for creative freedom within the game to approach objectives, if such objectives are present.

For example, most flight simulators are considered to be open-world games as one can fly anywhere within the mapped world, but they are not considered a sandbox game as there are generally few creative aspects brought into the game.

=== Emergent gameplay ===
Gameplay of Junk Runner 64, an open world homebrew game

The combination of open world and sandbox mechanics can lead towards emergent gameplay, complex reactions that emerge (either expectedly or unexpectedly) from the interaction of relatively simple game mechanics. According to Peter Molyneux, emergent gameplay appears wherever a game has a good simulation system that allows players to play in the world and have it respond realistically to their actions. It is what made SimCity and The Sims compelling to players. Similarly, being able to freely interact with the city's inhabitants in Grand Theft Auto added an extra dimension to the series.

In recent years game designers have attempted to encourage emergent play by providing players with tools to expand games through their own actions. Examples include in-game web browsers in EVE Online and The Matrix Online; XML integration tools and programming languages in Second Life; shifting exchange rates in Entropia Universe; and the complex object-and-grammar system used to solve puzzles in Scribblenauts. Other examples of emergence include interactions between physics and artificial intelligence. One challenge that remains to be solved, however, is how to tell a compelling story using only emergent technology.

In an op-ed piece for BBC News, David Braben, co-creator of Elite, called truly open-ended game design "The Holy Grail" of modern video gaming, citing games like Elite and the Grand Theft Auto series as early steps in that direction. Peter Molyneux has also stated that he believes emergence (or emergent gameplay) is where video game development is headed in the future. He has attempted to implement emergent gameplay to a great extent in some of his games, particularly Black & White and Fable.

=== Procedural generation of open worlds ===
Procedural generation refers to content generated algorithmically rather than manually, and is often used to generate game levels and other content. While procedural generation does not guarantee that a game or sequence of levels is nonlinear, it is an important factor in reducing game development time and opens up avenues making it possible to generate larger and more or less unique seamless game worlds on the fly and using fewer resources. This kind of procedural generation is known as worldbuilding, in which general rules are used to construct a believable world.

Most 4X and roguelike games make use of procedural generation to some extent to generate game levels. SpeedTree is an example of a developer-oriented tool used in the development of The Elder Scrolls IV: Oblivion and aimed at speeding up the level design process. Procedural generation also made it possible for the developers of Elite, David Braben and Ian Bell, to fit the entire game—including thousands of planets, dozens of trade commodities, multiple ship types and a plausible economic system—into less than 22 kilobytes of memory. More recently, No Man's Sky procedurally generated over 18 quintillion planets including flora, fauna, and other features that can be researched and explored.

=== Level streaming ===
With more advanced computing hardware with faster input/output data transfer rates, such as optical drives, hard disk drives (HDDs), solid-state drives (SSDs), and larger amounts of memory, game developers have been able to take advantage of continuously loading new level assets – models, textures, and audio – into the computer or console's memory as the player approaches the edge of one level and the start of a new one. This can effectively make the transition from one level to another level appear to be seamless and avoid the use of loading screens. This is known as level streaming or in-game streaming, and is often used for open world games to give the perception of a fully-interconnected space. There are often tricks used to give the computer hardware sufficient time to load the assets for the next area. The player's speed may be reduced, while story cues are presented to draw the player's attention. The player may be required to enter areas in which their view of the world is plausibly restricted, sometimes referred to as "loading tunnels". With newer consoles, such as the PlayStation 5 and Xbox Series X and Series S, special SSD arrays alongside software libraries that have a total high data throughput can eliminate the need for any loading tunnels in a seamless world game.

== History ==
=== 20th century ===
There is no consensus on what the earliest open-world game is, due to differing definitions of how large or open a world needs to be. Inverse provides some early examples games that established elements of the open world: Jet Rocket, a 1970 Sega electro-mechanical arcade game that, while not a video game, predated the flight simulator genre to give the player free roaming capabilities, and dnd, a 1975 text-based adventure game for the PLATO system that offered non-linear gameplay. Ars Technica traces the concept back to the free-roaming exploration of 1976 text adventure game Colossal Cave Adventure, which inspired the free-roaming exploration of Adventure (1980), but notes that it was not until 1984 that what "we now know as open-world gaming" took on a "definite shape" with 1984 space simulator Elite, considered a pioneer of the open world; Gamasutra argues that its open-ended sandbox style is rooted in flight simulators, such as SubLOGIC's Flight Simulator (1979/80), noting most flight sims "offer a 'free flight' mode that allows players to simply pilot the aircraft and explore the virtual world". Others trace the concept back to 1981 CRPG Ultima, which had a free-roaming overworld map inspired by tabletop RPG Dungeons & Dragons. The overworld maps of the first five Ultima games, released up to 1988, lacked a single, unified scale, with towns and other places represented as icons; this style was adopted by the first three Dragon Quest games, released from 1986 to 1988 in Japan.

Early examples of open-world gameplay in adventure games include The Portopia Serial Murder Case (1983) and The Lords of Midnight (1984), with open-world elements also found in The Hobbit (1982) and Valhalla (1983). The strategy video game, The Seven Cities of Gold (1984), is also cited as an early open-world game, influencing Sid Meier's Pirates! (1987). Eurogamer also cites British computer games such as Ant Attack (1983) and Sabre Wulf (1984) as early examples.

According to Game Informer's Kyle Hilliard, Hydlide (1984) and The Legend of Zelda (1986) were among the first open-world games, along with Ultima. IGN traces the roots of open-world game design to The Legend of Zelda, which it argues is "the first really good game based on exploration", while noting that it was anticipated by Hydlide, which it argues is "the first RPG that rewarded exploration". According to GameSpot, never "had a game so open-ended, nonlinear, and liberating been released for the mainstream market" before The Legend of Zelda. According to The Escapist, The Legend of Zelda was an early example of open-world, nonlinear gameplay, with an expansive and cohesive world, inspiring many games to adopt a similar open-world design.

Mercenary (1985) has been cited as the first open world 3D action-adventure game. There were also other open-world games in the 1980s, such as Back to Skool (1985), Turbo Esprit (1986) and Alternate Reality: The City (1985). Wasteland, released in 1988, is also considered an open-world game. The early 1990s saw open-world games such as Colorado, The Terminator (1990), The Adventures of Robin Hood (1991), and Hunter (1991), which IGN describes as the first sandbox game to feature full 3D, third-person graphics, and Ars Technica argues "has one of the strongest claims to the title of GTA forebear". Sierra On-Line's 1992 adventure game King's Quest VI has an open world; almost half of the quests are optional, many have multiple solutions, and players can solve most in any order. Atari Jaguar launch title, Cybermorph (1993), was notable for its open 3D polygonal-world and non-linear gameplay. Quarantine (1994) is an example of an open-world driving game from this period, while Iron Soldier (1994) is an open-world mech game. The director of 1997's Blade Runner argues that that game was the first open world three-dimensional action adventure game.

I think The Elder Scrolls II: Daggerfall is one of those games that people can 'project' themselves on. It does so many things and allows [for] so many play styles that people can easily imagine what type of person they'd like to be in game.

— Todd Howard

IGN considers Nintendo's Super Mario 64 (1996) revolutionary for its 3D open-ended free-roaming worlds, which had rarely been seen in 3D games before, along with its analog stick controls and camera control. Other 3D examples include Mystical Ninja Starring Goemon (1997), Ocarina of Time (1998), the DMA Design (Rockstar North) game Body Harvest (1998), the Angel Studios (Rockstar San Diego) games Midtown Madness (1999) and Midnight Club: Street Racing (2000), the Reflections Interactive (Ubisoft Reflections) game Driver (1999), and the Rareware games Banjo-Kazooie (1998), Donkey Kong 64 (1999), and Banjo-Tooie (2000).

1UP considers Sega's adventure Shenmue (1999) the originator of the "open city" subgenre, touted as a "FREE" ("Full Reactive Eyes Entertainment") game giving players the freedom to explore an expansive sandbox city with its own day-night cycles, changing weather, and fully voiced non-player characters going about their daily routines. The game's large interactive environments, wealth of options, level of detail and the scope of its urban sandbox exploration has been compared to later sandbox games like Grand Theft Auto III and its sequels, Sega's own Jet Set Radio and Yakuza series, Fallout 3, and Deadly Premonition.

=== 21st century ===
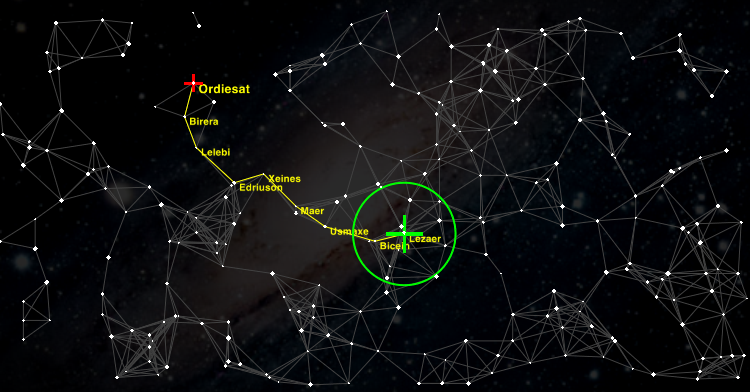
Galactic trade route map of the space trading and combat simulator, Oolite

Grand Theft Auto has had over 200 million sales. Creative director Gary Penn, who previously worked on Frontier: Elite II, cited Elite as a key influence, calling it "basically Elite in a city", and mentioned other team members being influenced by Syndicate and Mercenary. Grand Theft Auto III combined elements from previous games, and fused them together into a new immersive 3D experience that helped define open-world games for a new generation. Executive producer Sam Houser described it as "Zelda meets Goodfellas", while producer Dan Houser also cited The Legend of Zelda: Ocarina of Time and Super Mario 64 as influences. Radio stations had been implemented earlier in games such as Maxis' SimCopter (1996), the ability to beat or kill non-player characters date back to games such as The Portopia Serial Murder Case (1983), and Valhalla (1983) and the way in which players run over pedestrians and get chased by police has been compared to Pac-Man (1980).

The Assassin's Creed series by Ubisoft uses open world mechanics set in historical real world locations, such as the Holy Land or Renaissance Italy. The early games were notable for requiring the player to climb large towers as to survey the land and identify landmarks which would then populate the player's mini-maps with quests and other points of interests; this was explained in-game as to synchronize the memories of the character in the historical setting with a character in contemporary times that was viewing these genetic memories via a device called the Animus. This mechanic was reused in other Ubisoft series such as Far Cry and Watch Dogs, as well as used in other open world games like The Legend of Zelda: Breath of the Wild and Batman: Arkham Knight. The mechanic has been seen to gain some overuse in Ubisoft games, leading it to be called "Ubisoft towers" in a derogatory fashion.

In 2011, Dan Ryckert of Game Informer wrote that open-world crime games were "a major force" in the gaming industry for the preceding decade.

Another popular sandbox game is Minecraft, which has since become the best-selling video game of all time, selling over 238 million copies worldwide on multiple platforms by April 2021. Minecraft's procedurally generated overworlds cover a virtual 3.6 billion square kilometers.

No Man's Sky, released in 2016, is an open-world game set in a virtually infinite universe. According to the developers, through procedural generation, the game is able to produce more than 18 quintillion (18×10^{18} or 18,000,000,000,000,000,000) planets to explore. Several critics found that the nature of the game can become repetitive and monotonous, with the survival gameplay elements being lackluster and tedious. Jake Swearingen in New York said that the players can procedurally generate 18.6 quintillion unique planets, but they can't procedurally generate 18.6 quintillion unique things to do. Updates have aimed to address these criticisms.

In 2017, the open-world design of The Legend of Zelda: Breath of the Wild was described by critics as being revolutionary and by developers as a paradigm shift for open-world design. In contrast to the more structured approach of most open-world games, Breath of the Wild features a large and fully interactive world that is generally unstructured and rewards the exploration and manipulation of its world. Inspired by the original 1986 Legend of Zelda, the open world of Breath of the Wild integrates multiplicative gameplay, where "objects react to the player's actions and the objects themselves also influence each other". Along with a physics engine, the game's open-world also integrates a chemistry engine, "which governs the physical properties of certain objects and how they relate to each other", rewarding experimentation. Nintendo has described the game's approach to open-world design as "open-air".

== See also ==
- Nonlinear gameplay
- Persistent world
