= Não-Me-Toque =

Municipality of Rio Grande do Sul, Brazil

Não-Me-Toque Não-Me-Toque
- Municipality
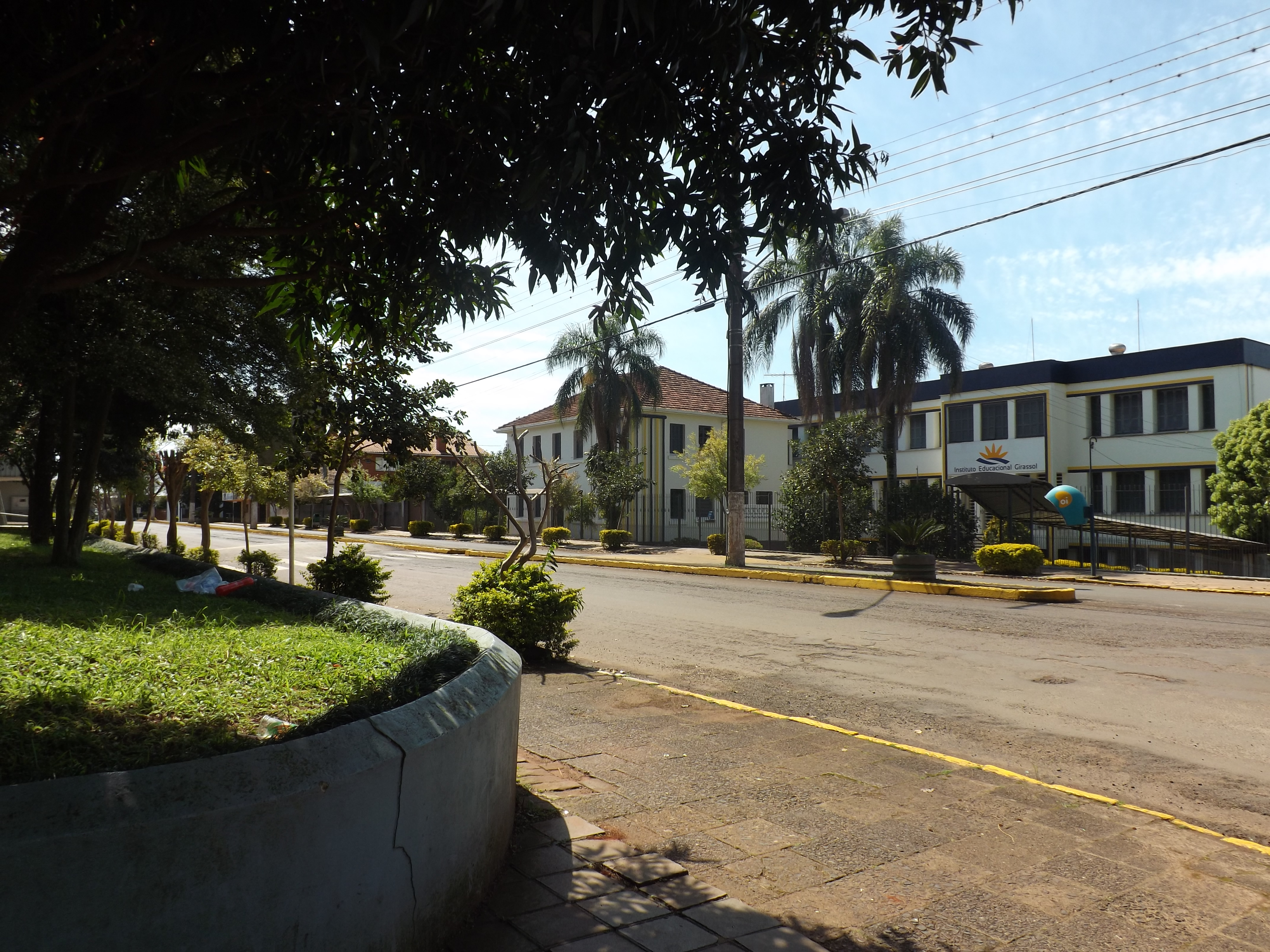
- View of Não-Me-Toque

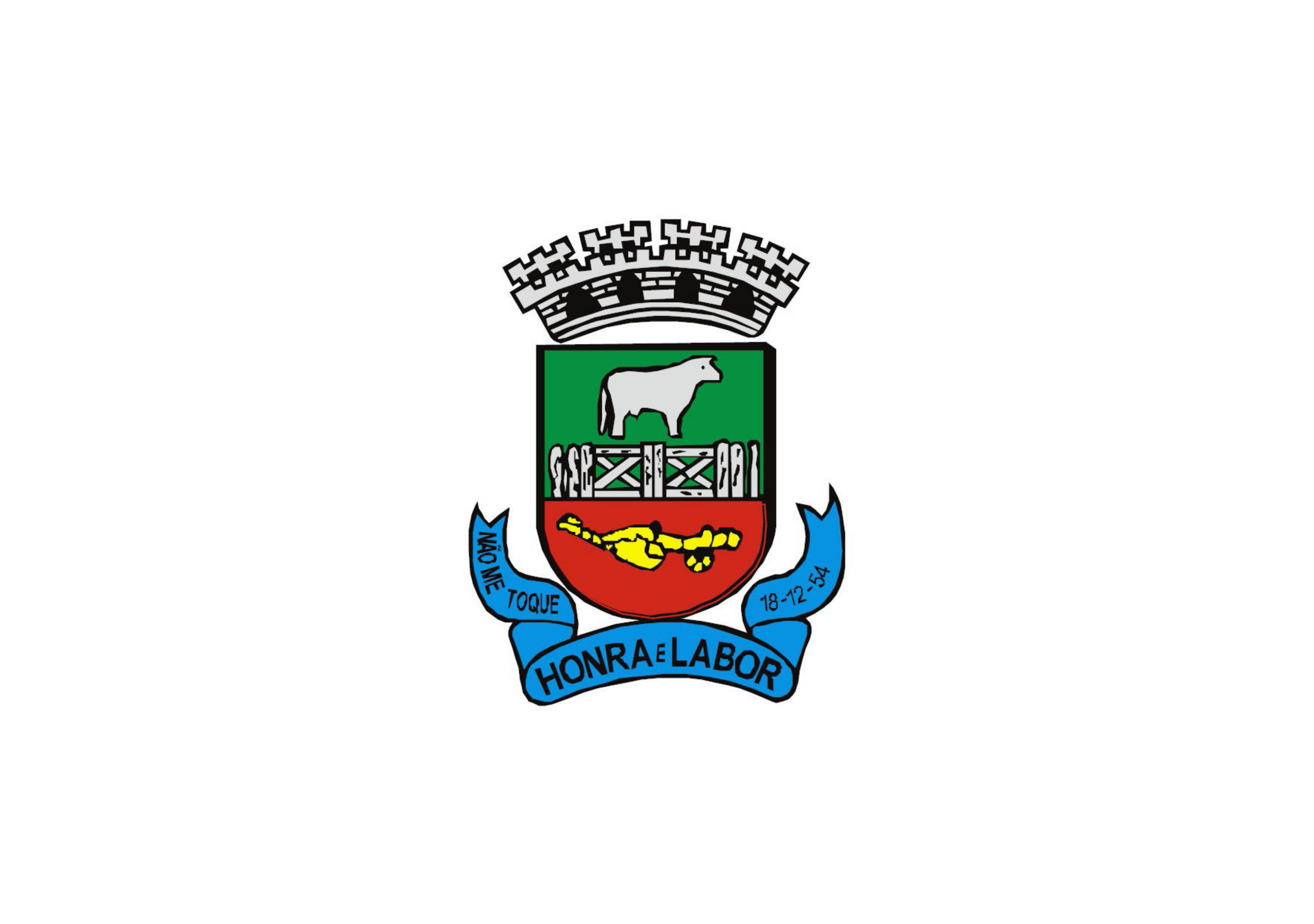
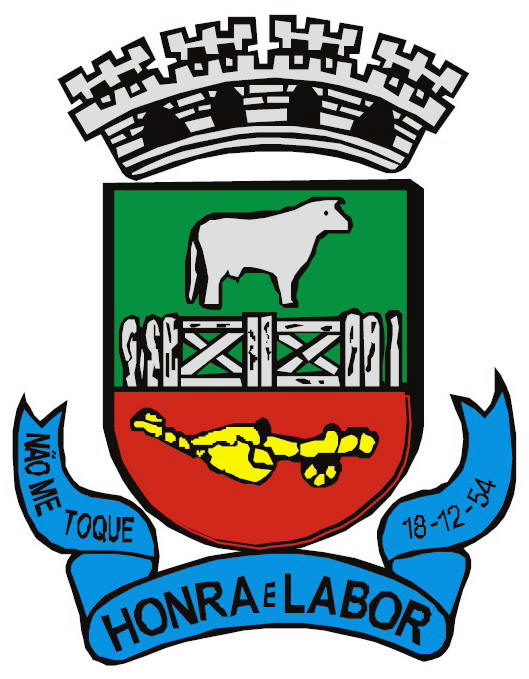
- Flag Coat of arms
- Motto: "Honra e Labor" (Latin) "Honor and work"
- Location of Não-Me-Toque in Rio Grande do Sul

- Position
- Coordinates: 28°27′32″S 52°49′15″W
- Country: Brazil
- State: Rio Grande do Sul

Government
  - Mayor: Gilson dos Santos (UNIÃO (Brasil))

Area
  - Total: 361.67 km^{2} (139.64 sq mi)
- Elevation: 514 m (1,686 ft)

Population (2020)
  - Total: 17,758
  - Density: 49.100/km^{2} (127.17/sq mi)
- Demonym: não-me-toquense
- Postal code: 99470-000
- Area code: 54
- Website: https://naometoque.rs.gov.br/

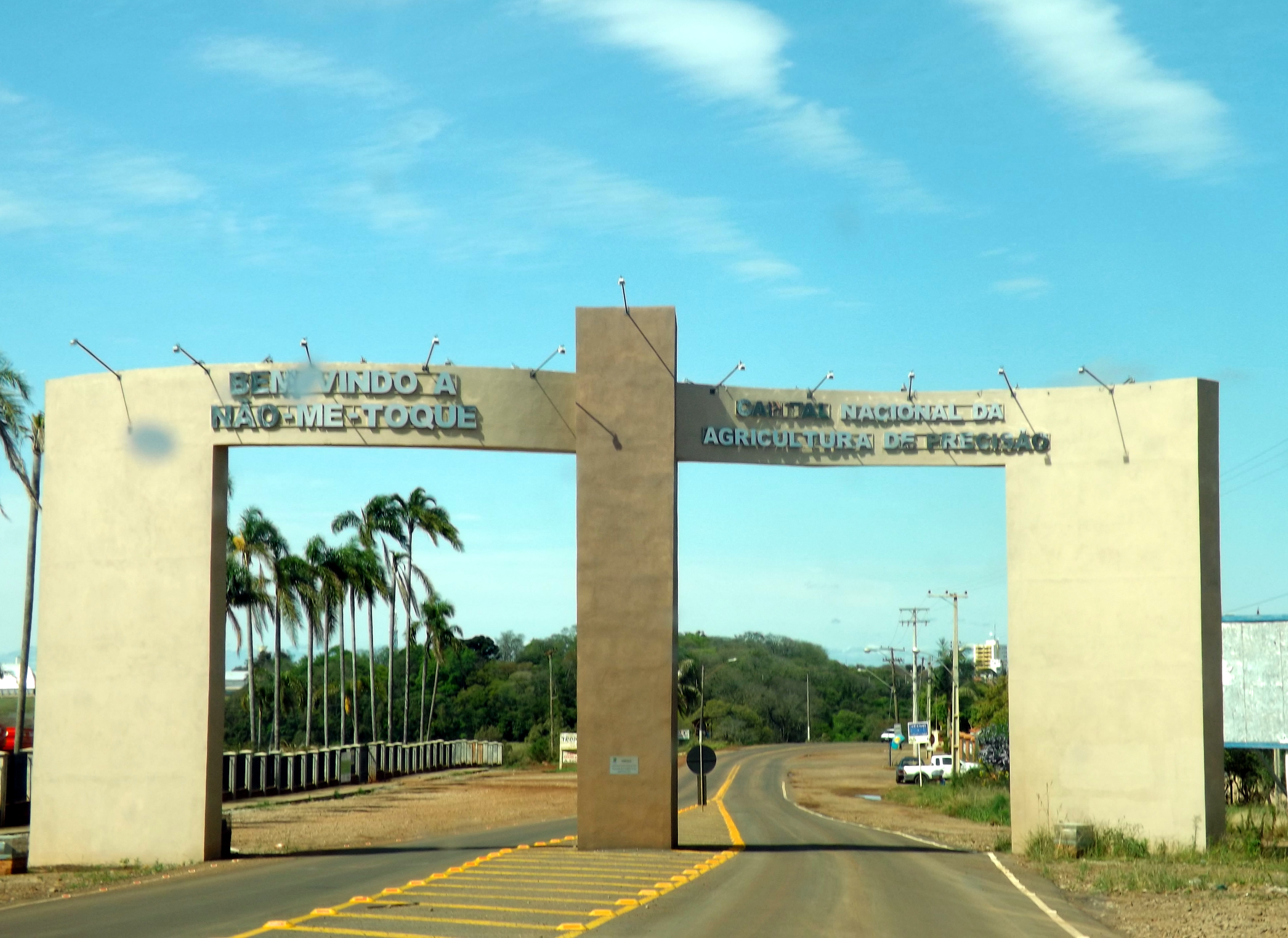
Entrance to the city.

Não-Me-Toque (literally Don't-Touch-Me in Portuguese) is a Brazilian municipality located in the state of Rio Grande do Sul.

== History ==
The city's current territory was only explored and occupied when Portuguese descendants established their farms on the place, in the second decade of the 19th century. By the end of the 19th century, families of Dutch immigrants also occupied the southern part of the territory, in 1824. In 1949, the first Dutch families arrived to the town, making the city one of the starting points of the Dutch immigration on southern Brazil.

There is no exact information of the name's origins, but there are two theories: the abundance of the Dasyphyllum spinescens plant, which name is "touch-me-not" in Portuguese; or the establishment of the farm "Fazenda Não-Me-Toque", founded on July 20, 1885.

Because of the constant humiliation the citizens of the city suffered because of the name, it was renamed Campo Real (Royal Field) in December 1971, until it was changed back after a plebiscite in April 1977.

== Geography ==
Não-Me-Toque is located in the region of the Planalto Médio, in the micro-region of the Alto Jacuí, Rio Grande do Sul. It is 471 km (292 mi) away from the coast (or the nearest coastal city). It is neighbored by the city of Carazinho on the north (the largest city nearby), Lagoa dos Três Cantos on the south, Santo Antônio do Planalto on the east and Colorado on the west. It is 280 km (173 mi) away from the state's capital, Porto Alegre.

== See also ==
- List of municipalities in Rio Grande do Sul
