= Biosys =

1999 video game

- Developer: JumpStart Solutions
- Publisher: Take-Two Interactive
- Director: Simon Redman
- Producers: Aaron Witkin (Executive); Mick Everall (Associate)
- Platform: Windows
- Release: February 1999
- Genres: Adventure, Simulation, Survival
- Mode: Single-player

Biosys (stylised as biosys or BioSys) is a 1999 simulation/graphic adventure game hybrid developed by British studio Jumpstart Solutions Interactive and published by Take-Two Interactive. Inspired by the Biosphere 2 experiment, the game is set inside an artificial biosphere.

== Plot ==
=== Background context ===
At the height of his career, celebrated ecologist and environmental campaigner Professor Alan Russell announced a Biosphere 4 project in 1990 in the Ecuadorian slopes of Mount Chimborazo as a follow-up to the Arizonian Biosphere 2. According to Russell, it would be an "enormous sealed environment, capable of identifying current research into the processes of our ecosystem". As lead of the Russell Group, he soon announced that he aimed to use the facility to develop a new type of vegetation called Bio-Engineered Synthetic Hybrids (Synths) that would combat the rising levels of CO_{2}. Russell's outlandish statements were ridiculed by the press, and to the world the plans were shelved when in 1992 Russell pulled the plug and abruptly resigned in order to avoid his public commitments and instead work on "the one key issue we now face". The Russell Group was in the process of pushing Sanctuary Initiative legislation to save the oceans, but, to the world at large, it seemed that without their leader the group lost influence and momentum. By abandoning and sabotaging the project, Russell caused a scandal. In actuality, Russell had retreated to Mt. Chimborazo and began to commence work on the biodomes, and lobbied the government to aid this project.

In 1995, it was reported that top secret construction work was happening around the biosphere location, protected by local government forces, and by August 1996 the three primary biodomes were sealed. Russell's attention turned to his project Biosphere 4 - an accelerated evolution biodome to house the Synths – and despite his reservations decided to sell to Subtech to ensure its completion. It was officially announced that Sam Devlin would become the sole funder of the Biosphere 4 research facility when his company Subtech, a subsidiary of Subsea Technologies Corporation, bought out the project. Devlin and Russell had previously been Subtech's employees in the 1970s, but when it was revealed their project for allowing people to live at ocean depths for months was to allow the mining of Earth's seabeds, Russell left while Devlin stayed. By buying him out, Devlin now compromised Russell and effectively removed the last obstacle in their way. The Biosphere 4 'popped' to become a sealed environment by the year 2000, and Russell began the second phase of his project, to create Synths. This became his singular project, to the point where he almost eradicated the rainforest biodome due to a fungal outbreak. In 1993, Russell shared his research regarding the Synth4 plants to his colleague, Sarah Parish, and asked for her help with the research. However, in 1995, he became too accustomed to the quick feedback loop of the biodome, and let the latest variant – Synth8 - be planted into the Biodome despite warnings from Sarah regarding their instability. After discovering that the Synths began attacking their babies within the growth chamber, Russell feared that he should have heeded Sarah's warnings though noted that oxygen could kill the strongest of Synths. He pumps oxygen in killing his creations, and he fears what he has unleashed.

In the lead-up to the 10th anniversary of the Biosphere 4, Russell sent Devlin his proposed speech which pushed environmental issues. This angered Devlin who noted that he owned the project and Russell, and that it was seen as "his baby" at Subtech, so he would reassert his power if need be. In 1996, Devlin emailed Russell about workers arriving to construct a leisure resort complex in the advanced evolution biodome called Club Eden, which Russell was not happy about due to putting an end to his Synth experiments. When Devlin sent Russell a blackmailing video detailing how Russell had orchestrated an assassination of a colleague, Russell noted that Biosphere 4 was his home and that he would do anything in his power to protect it. The act of welding is turning oxygen into CO_{2} as the workers began to notice a change in the ecosystem, causing the air to become unfit to breathe and making them suffer from respiratory issues or exhaustion. The workers began hearing and seeing weird things (the Synths), and Russell begins making trips to the biodome, spraying fire extinguishers to lure out the Synths. Devlin instigates a policy where if the project wasn't completed, the workers would be sealed inside the dome. Devlin also disconnects power from the biodome to the main control centre so Russell can't interfere. On December 10, 1997, the biodome wired up to the terminal so they could regulate their own atmosphere, taking the power away from Russell. Soon enough, a worker is killed by a Synth. On December 12, 1997, Devlin removed the ladder leaving to the cave out of the Biodome, effectively trapping the workers. On December 16, 1997, Russel issues his last warning and on December 20, Devlin tells the workers that everything's going to be okay. On December 23, 1997, two more workers disappear. Each of these deaths causes CO_{2} to be turned into oxygen. On December 24 during a Christmas party, Russell leaves a frantic message to the workers about the Synths, before a fire breaks loose which decimates the biodome. It's implied that Russel did this in an attempt to flush the biome clean by pumping oxygen, thus killing all the Synths, as relayed in an audio recording. There aren't enough extinguishers to put out the fire. Russell shows up to help while the leader of the workers, who had previously been skeptical of Russell, attempts to follow him to safety, but he and the rest die (accelerated by the alcohol). Russell barely escapes and passes out once he returns to the rainforest biodome, suffering from amnesia, which is where the game starts, on December 25, 1997.

Devlin sends Russell a video message saying that he knows Russell is responsible for the fire, and that he's furious and will destroy his life's work at any cost.

Upon the player nearing completion of restoring the atmosphere of Biosphere 4, Devlin sends Russell a final message detailing that thanks to Russel's efforts, Club Eden is ready for its first consignment of tourists, and that Subtech will kill Russell and posthumously ruin his reputation as the murderer of the Subtech worker crew and for being complicit in the assassination of his partner. Russell successfully escapes by un'popping' Biosphere 4, though the experiment proves that colonies can be created on other planets like Mars. When the police wish to speak to him regarding the fire and assassination, Russell disappears without a trace. Meanwhile, Club Eden opened as planned and patrons noticed their partners going missing, which Devlin put down to administration error. Devlin is later killed by a Synth, and the Synth spores spread out into the human world.

=== The game's perspective ===
The game follows the protagonist Professor Alan Russell and is set inside the fictional ecological facility Biosphere Four which was built by the Subtech Corporation. Russell awakes in what first appears to be a rainforest, but is actually one of four artificial biomes. The player initially has to maintain Russel's survival inside this environment and begin to unravel the mysteries behind this facility and the character's current predicament (Russell is suffering from amnesia). The ultimate goal of this real-time adventure is for the player to restore the natural balance in four artificial biotopes and escape.

== Gameplay ==
The player navigates a jungle with the help of the compass tool.

The game is a combination of mystery, puzzle, survival, and simulation genres.

Pressing Tab will show the health/energy status of the player, which show if the player is hungry, thirsty, tired, hot, sick, or has other physical conditions. This information is used when players plan trips through the complex – longer trips use up more resources. The game consists of 360° rotational screens, and predefined pathways for the player to follow. The game is presented from the subjective first-person point of view. The biospheres live and breath in real-time – for instance plants grow as day and night passes. Decisions made in the game can have effects on both that enclosure and the other biodomes, and poor decisions can cause plant and animal life to die.

== Development ==
Aaron Witkin, the game's executive producer, had preceded this title with the 1994 CD-ROM The Dead Sea Scrolls Revealed, along with Pixel Multimedia and under license from the Israel Antiquities Authority. This game bears a similarity to the "scientific experiment Biosphère 2 that had plunged a few men and women into a giant sphere to determine if they could preserve the ecosystem and live in total self-sufficiency".

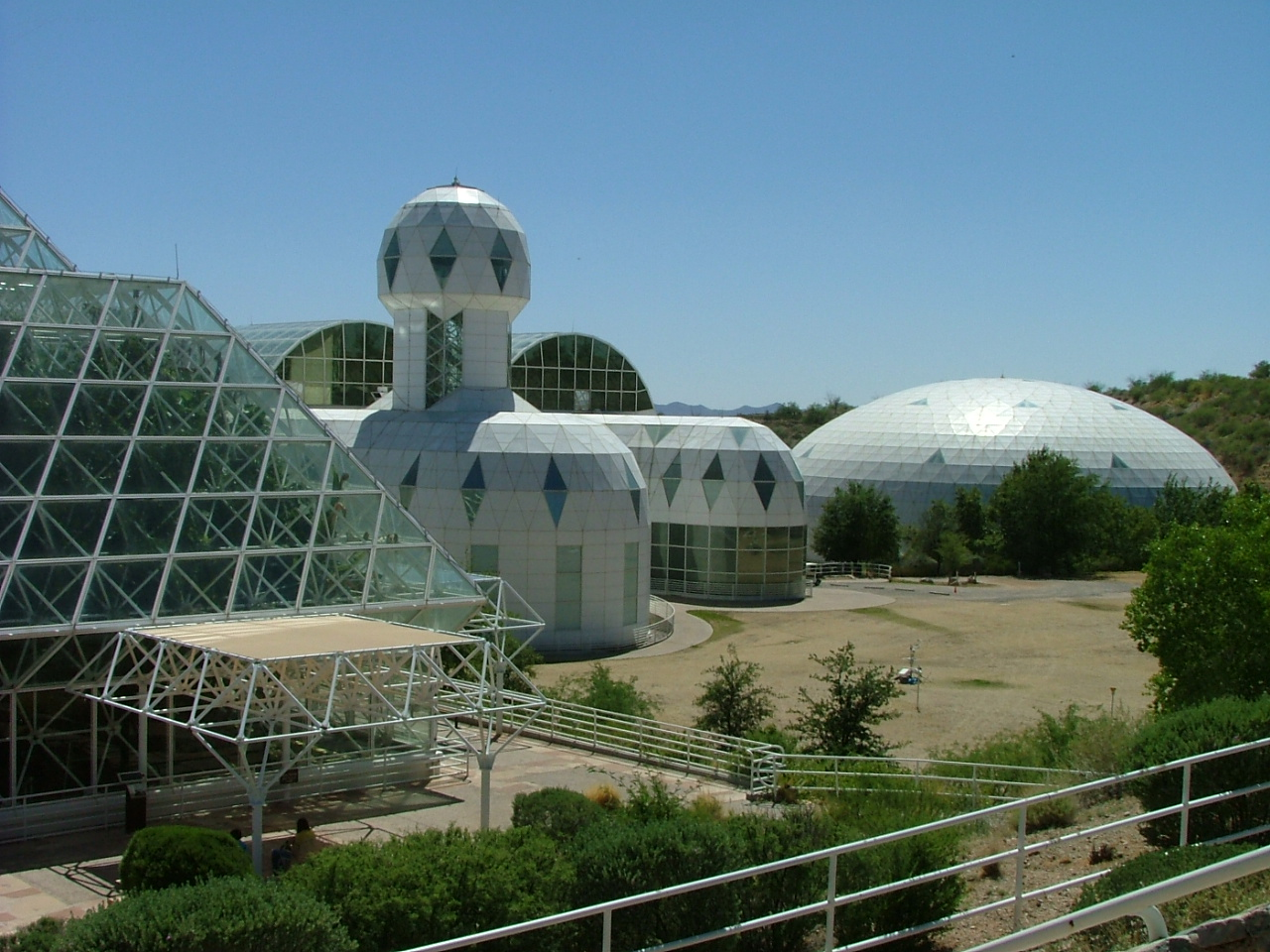
Commentators noted Biosys' similarity to the real-world Biosphere 2 experiment.

The game was announced in PC Games issue 74, which noted that Take 2 was working on a render adventure in the style of Myst, which would include puzzles while also conveying biological connections. Originally meant to be released in October 1998, then November 13, 1998, but it was eventually delayed for the following year. In January 1999, Arcade reported the game would be released later that month. By February 1999, the game was due to be released in Germany during the First Quarter of that year. It was eventually released in Germany on March 3.

Tancred Dyke-Wells was an artist, animator and game designer on the title. The game has one hundred pre-rendered locations, and includes both a day/night cycle and a health status mechanic. Jumpstart Solutions consulted with three employees of Biospheres, which was owned by the founder of artificial biosphere Biosphere 2, who were credited in the game for “Ecological Research.” Touch Interactive / Touch Animation, based on Covent Garden, did much of the development for the title. The role of Jon Brierley was to " create a hugely complex computer interface within the game, which controlled and monitored the vast virtual environment".

It became one of the first major games published by Take-Two. The game was never published in the US, though was released in the UK and Germany. In Italy the game was to be distributed by Leader.

The game was a total commercial failure.

A real-time 3D sequel entitled "Mission To Mars" was to be released at the turn of the millennium, project directed by Tancred Dyke-Wells, but it was eventually unpublished. A message at the end of Biosys told players to "look out" for the game.

As the game is so unknown, there is no dedicated community to make it accessible. For many years the best way to play it is to buy an old CD-ROM or to download and manipulate files off archive.org. However, in the late 2010s a version for download which included a Windows 1995 emulator was released by Zombs Lair.

== Critical reception ==
The game drew many comparisons with the adventure Myst and the survival game Robinson's Requiem, and critics often wrote about the game's difficulty or repetitiveness, though the audiovisuals were often praised.

=== Pre-release ===
In November 1998, PC Zone summarised the upcoming release as: "Cyborg things do battle. Very probably in the future". The following month, PC Zone noted that the word 'biosys' is short for biological systems, so assumed the game was about "cyborgs having a fight". This implies that by December 1998 (two months before its release), major magazines hadn't yet received playable demos or critic copies.

=== Contemporary ===
In 1998, All Game Guide felt that the game was "impressively detailed", and held the player's interest throughout the mystery plotline. Arcade felt that while the game involves many puzzles and resource management, it avoids being frustrating due to its engaging plot, though added that it can play a little slow. In January 1999, PC Gamer UK felt the gameplay was more sophisticated than the "pedestrian puzzling" of Myst, though felt it was let down by narrative confusion and a disorientating interface. In February 1999, Publico described it as a clone of Myst, released at the time when such a game was considered obsolete. Generation 4 said that the game felt like a "real ecosystem that seems to have been recreated". PC Player wrote that it's vital the player understands the interface as "any thoughtless change can cause the entire ecosystem to collapse", and suggested a month later that the game couldn't decide what it wanted to be; for an adventure game it had too few puzzles and for a simulation it wasn't serious enough.

In March 1999, PC Games deemed the game an unusual mix of adventure and eco-simulation, both an edutainment product and a fully-fledged graphical adventure, and recommended it for players interested in ecological issues. Gamereactor felt that a really good idea was hampered by poor execution. PC Joker deemed it an "original and challenging survival adventure", and expressed excitement that Jumpstart was working on a sequel. PC Action felt the complex narrative was the bright spot of an experience let down by things such as broken graphics and uninteresting riddles. PC Zeta felt that the game brought together lovers of three types of games: adventure, strategy, and simulation; additionally the magazine praised the audiovisual assets, noted that the puzzles were perfect for those less experienced in the adventure genre, and added that the interface is relatively easy to pick up. The magazine ultimately decided that Biosys contained all the elements of a good title: "originality, excellent story, engaging game situations and plot that unfolds in a crescendo [of] discoveries all while desperately trying to survive".

That April, Pelit thought the game would be a great experience for anyone who has imagined surviving in nature and manipulating it. Meanwhile Gamestar offered a scathing review, deeming it boring, overly complicated, and appealing to no one. PC Open deemed it an "unmissable game for both lovers of adventure for simulation enthusiasts", and deemed it one of the best video games of the year. The game reminded Gambler magazine of Robinson's Requiem, though noted it also included RPG and ecological gameplay; ultimately it deemed the game fit for the patient player due to its intricacies. PC Zone felt that while "interacting with a dynamically changing realistic world" would intriguing in theory, the game becomes very tedious, dull, and plodding in practice, and said it was like Robinson's Requiem only "complete crap"; the magazine ultimately compared the graphics negatively to Starship Titanic and said the title would only have value to those who enjoyed studying ecology. Micromania compared the effect of combating a myriad of threats in a labyrinthine environment to tamagotchi gameplay; the magazine commented that the technical design was awkward and artistic design came off as poor, in particular finding the screen transitions to be frustrating. However, Micromania praised the sound effects.

In June, Spielletips felt the game was "interesting and multi-faceted". Przygodoskop thought the game touched on themes of loneliness and loss. PC Gamer Italy concluded its review by asserting that "Even with its limits Bìosys remains a good adventure: the excellent ambience, involving storyline, and the simulation elements that distinguish it from every other adventure".

=== Retrospective ===
Biosys received the 1999 Seal of Approval from the German Center for Youth Media Culture.

In April 2001, Game reviewer Paul Smith thought he game makes more sense than Riven, but that it lacks the mystery of the game. New Scientist thought the game "probably teaches you more biology than you'll realise at the time", and notes that the game requires a fast processor and much RAM in order to look its best. In 2005, Rebell felt the gameplay of the long-forgotten Biosys made games from Russian developers look like Tamagotchi games due to its success as a challenging adventure game. A decade after its release, Wine HQ would write that it was "quite timeless and, sad enough, the only of its kind". Adventures Index summarised it as "another small masterpiece that went completely unnoticed thanks to the stupidity of the reviewers". Zombs Lair felt it is a "really interesting and, sadly, very obscure game". In 2017, Chordian felt Biosys was a game to skip because of the tedium in constantly keeping track of one health and energy status. In 2018, Egg Network felt the game was very innovative and ahead of its time.

The game inspired Edwige Lelievre's 2019 title Tevi, which was created in partnership with the Eden Project. Lelievre is currently completing a research project on Tevi another of her games called Vestigia, and Biosys; she is studying the latter from an external, poietic perspective. She has deemed the piece a meditation on "the relationship between humans and nature".
