= ReadySoft =

Canadian video game company

ReadySoft Incorporated
- Logo used since 1991
- Industry: Video games
- Founded: 1987
- Defunct: 1996
- Fate: Purchased by Malofilm, later Behaviour Communications, in 1996.
- Headquarters: Toronto, Ontario, Canada
- Key people: David Foster: founder

ReadySoft was a Canadian video game developer and publisher and distributor founded in 1987 by David Foster, based in Ontario, Canada. Products include various emulators as well as home computer ports of Sullivan Bluth's LaserDisc game series Dragon's Lair, Space Ace, and their sequels. As a publisher, it frequently handled North American release of games by French developer Silmarils.

== Emulators ==
ReadySoft's first product was a Commodore 64 emulator for the Amiga simply titled The 64 Emulator developed by Randy Linden. In 1992, ReadySoft published the A-Max II and A-Max II Plus Macintosh emulators for the Amiga which were software emulators augmented by add-on hardware.

== Collaboration with Sullivan Bluth ==
In 1988, Readysoft acquired the rights to do a home port of Dragon's Lair, the Amiga port of which was its first commercial game release. The limitations of the 16-bit machines necessitated redrawing all of the graphics from the LaserDisc originals, and cutting much of the original content. Randy Linden programmed the port and was responsible for the video compression algorithm as well as part of the rotoscoping. Reviews praised the strong graphics and sound of the ports, though noted that the gameplay did not live up to their quality. After the success of the initial Dragon's Lair, ReadySoft continued its collaboration with Sullivan Bluth to create home ports of Space Ace. It also reworked the missing scenes that could not be included with the initial releases of Dragon's Lair and Space Ace into second parts called Escape from Singe's Castle and Space Ace II: Borf's Revenge.

== Games ==
In addition to porting the Sullivan Bluth LaserDisc games, ReadySoft also created its own interactive cartoons in a similar style, initially with Guy Spy and the Crystals of Armageddon and later Brain Dead 13 when full-motion video became a viable technology on home computers.

=== Developed or ported by ReadySoft ===
- Brain Dead 13 (1995)
- Dragon's Lair II: Time Warp (1996) Rerelease
- Space Ace (1995) Rerelease
- Dragon's Lair III: The Curse of Mordread (1992)
- Guy Spy and the Crystals of Armageddon (1992)
- Space Ace II: Borf's Revenge (1991)
- Dragon's Lair II: Time Warp (1990)
- Space Ace (1989)

=== Published or distributed by ReadySoft ===
- Jersey Devil (1997) after the Malofilm acquisition, with Malofilm branding
- Deus (1996) US release
- Music Chase 1: The Music in Me (1995)
- Ishar 3: The Seven Gates of Infinity (1995) Canadian release of DOS version
- Robinson's Requiem (1994) US release of 3DO and DOS versions
- The Patrician (1993) US release of DOS version
- Arctic Baron (1993) US release of DOS version
- Sleeping Gods Lie (1991) North American release of DOS version
- Volfied (1991) DOS port
- Wrath of the Demon (1990)
- Bomb Busters (1988)
- Rock Challenge (1988)
- Cosmic Bouncer (1988)

== Infotainment titles ==
ReadySoft published a series of infotainment multimedia CDs for NHL hockey teams, with photos, videos and a trivia game. Their library included titles for the Toronto Maple Leafs, Montreal Canadiens, New York Rangers, Chicago Blackhawks, Detroit Red Wings and Boston Bruins.

In this category, it also published a multimedia car buyer's guide Cars on CD '97 with information on over 400 models of vehicles from 45 manufacturers, calling it the "largest show-room in Canada".
