= Colorado (video game) =

1990 action-adventure video game

- Front Cover of Colorado for IBM PC compatible computers
- Developer: Silmarils
- Publisher: Silmarils
- Platforms: Amiga, Atari ST, IBM PC compatible
- Release: EU: 1990; UK: 1991 (Action 16 budget re-release)
- Genre: Action-adventure
- Mode: Single-player

Colorado is a 1990 action-adventure video game developed and published by the French studio Silmarils for the Amiga, Atari ST and IBM PC compatible computers.

The player controls trapper David O'Brian as he searches for a legendary lost gold mine along the Colorado River. The game has been described as the first, and as of 2023, still one of the very few games to depict the "French West" - the territories west of the Mississippi River before these lands became the American Wild West. It is also one of the early examples of the open world game design philosophy.

Contemporary reviews were generally favorable. The reviewers consistently praised Colorado's graphics and Western setting, with many critics also highlighting its exploration and canoeing sequences. Opinion was more divided on the gameplay: while several reviewers appreciated its combination of action and adventure elements, others found it derivative, slow-paced or lacking atmosphere, with criticism frequently directed at its controls, save features, sound and disk loading problems. Contemporary reviewers also frequently compared Colorado to earlier Silmarils action-adventures such as Le Fétiche Maya and Targhan, regarding it as an evolution of the studio's established formula.

== Gameplay ==
Colorado is an action-adventure game in which the player controls the main character from either the keyboard or a joystick while exploring a three-dimensional game world. The game is divided into multiple stages connected by canoe journeys down the Colorado River. Each stage contains a primary objective required to advance the story. During canoe sequences, the player must avoid rocks, fallen trees and hostile canoeists while ensuring they reach the designated landing area, as missing it causes the canoe to be swept over a waterfall. The river connects four major areas, only allows downstream travel, and can permanently carry the player past exits.

The game combines two distinct perspectives: a tilted side-view for exploration and an over-the-shoulder pseudo-3D view while travelling on the river. The tilted perspective allowed limited movement into the depth of the screen and more complex branching paths than typical side-scrolling action games. The player can move not only horizontally but also into and out of the screen, allowing limited movement along a third axis. In addition to walking, the main character can jump, climb, crouch, hide behind scenery, reload his rifle, switch between peaceful and combat stances, and use or examine collected objects. Although the game progresses through a series of interconnected screens, some locations offer multiple routes, allowing for non-linear exploration. However, progression ultimately requires completing objectives in a fixed sequence.

The game world comprises more than one hundred locations, including mountains, forests, canyons, caves and an Indian cemetery. In addition to the main objective of locating the legendary gold mine, the player completes a variety of side objectives, such as rescuing captured miners, saving a Native American child stranded in an eagle's nest and hunting the last remaining wolves.

During the adventure, the player encounters hostile Native Americans, rival gold seekers and wild animals including wolves, bears and eagles. Combat can be carried out using a shotgun, a hatchet or a knife. As the shotgun is less effective than expected because it must be reloaded with gunpowder after every shot and inflicts relatively limited damage, melee weapons are often preferable in combat.

Inventory management is a significant gameplay mechanic. The player may carry a maximum of six items simultaneously, requiring decisions about which equipment to keep or abandon. Although earlier locations can eventually be revisited, this is not immediately apparent to the player. Items collected throughout the game include weapons, medicine, gunpowder, dynamite and trade goods. Objects may be bartered with the merchant Mac Biggle in exchange for useful supplies.

Progress can be saved during the adventure, although reviews differed in describing the game's save system. Contemporary magazines noted that saving was automatic or available at designated locations, while a later retrospective criticized the game for providing only a single save slot.

== Plot ==
The game is set in 1801 in the Rocky Mountains along the Colorado River, coinciding with the brief period during which the region formed part of French Louisiana before the Louisiana Purchase. David O'Brian is a poor trapper who receives a treasure map from the dying chief of a Cheyenne tribe, whom he rescues in the opening story. The map supposedly leads to a lost gold mine, prompting David to embark on a journey through forests, mountains and rivers while facing hostile humans and wildlife in search of the treasure.

Following the map, David travels through forests, mountains, rivers and abandoned mines while fighting hostile Native Americans, wild animals and rival treasure hunters. Along the way he rescues captured miners, recovers valuable items, trades supplies with the travelling merchant Mac Biggle and helps friendly Native Americans, including rescuing a child trapped in an eagle's nest. Eventually David reaches the legendary mine of Pocahontas. After clearing a collapsed passage with dynamite, he discovers that the mine is real and filled with gold. Before leaving, he defeats a Pawnee chief, rescues the kidnapped son of the Cheyenne chief and receives a ceremonial medallion granting him safe passage through the tribe's territory. The game concludes with David escaping from the mine with the treasure.

== Development and release ==
Colorado was developed and published by French company Silmarils. It was released in 1990 for the Amiga, Atari ST and IBM PC compatible computers. In early 1991, the game was re-released in the United Kingdom as part of the Action 16 budget range.

Colorado was among Silmarils' earliest 16-bit titles, produced shortly after the company transitioned away from Amstrad CPC development toward Amiga, Atari ST and IBM PC platforms.

== Reception ==
Contemporary review scores

Review scores
Publication	Score
Aktueller Software Markt	62%
Amiga User International	70%
Commodore User	77%
Computer and Video Games	73%
Génération 4	84%
Joystick	ST: 79% PC: 70%
The Games Machine (UK)	78%
The One	2/5
Zero	78%
Zzap!64	79%
Amiga Action	84%
Micro News	Positive
Power Play	24%
Secret Service	Graphics: 90% Sound: 60% Playability: 90%
PC Extreme	70%
Tilt	16/20

=== 1990 ===
Reviewers for Amiga Action described Colorado as a challenging arcade adventure with an emphasis on exploration and puzzle-solving, similar to prior titles by the studio. The magazine praised its strong graphics, detailed backgrounds and atmospheric Wild West setting, particularly highlighting the canoe sequences and varied gameplay. However, the reviewers criticized the awkward controls, frequent need for precise timing and the game's unforgiving difficulty, while noting that the unusual side-view perspective initially took some getting used to. The magazine awarded Colorado an overall score of 72%.

Andy Smith of British Amiga Format praised the graphics, animation and puzzle-solving, but criticized the awkward controls and felt the overall design compared unfavourably with older Spectrum arcade adventures, concluding that the game mainly suited patient players. The reviewer awarded the game a score of 62%.

Carsten Borgmeier of the German magazine Amiga Joker praised Colorado's Western setting, graphics and environmental detail, describing its scenery as encouraging exploration and its premise as more original than that of a typical arcade adventure. He also commended the variety of gameplay, particularly the blend of action, exploration and puzzle-solving. However, Borgmeier criticized the flip-screen presentation, sparse sound, occasionally awkward controls and several frustrating difficulty spikes, while concluding that the game remained an entertaining adventure despite its flaws. He awarded it a score of 74%.

Klaus Segel of the German magazine Aktueller Software Markt described Colorado as a competent but unremarkable action-adventure, comparing it to earlier titles such as Le Fetiche Maya, Targhan (both by Silmarils) and Barbarian. He praised the game's humor and acknowledged several inventive touches, but criticized its graphics as merely adequate, its weak sound, long loading times and lack of engaging gameplay, concluding that it failed to deliver sustained enjoyment despite its ideas. Segel recommended the game only at a lower price than its retail cost, awarding it ratings of 7/10 for graphics and animation, 6/10 for sound, 6/10 for gameplay, 7/10 for motivation and 5/10 for value (averaging score of 62%).

Paul Glancey of British magazine Computer and Video Games described Colorado as one of the more entertaining 16-bit Western-themed games since Barbarian, praising its colorful graphics, varied gameplay and canoeing sequences, which he considered the game's highlight. However, he found the overall pace rather slow, criticized the stiff character animation, weak sound and repetitive trekking between screens, and concluded that while the game was worth trying for players who appreciated slower-paced adventures, action-oriented players would likely prefer other titles. He awarded Colorado an overall score of 73%.

Mike Pattenden of British magazine CU Amiga considered Colorado a well-executed arcade adventure despite its familiar mechanics. He praised the graphical detail, unusual Western setting, attention to detail, exploration, combat and canoeing sequences, describing the latter as one of the game's highlights. Pattenden criticized the limited sound and noted that the game borrowed heavily from established arcade-adventure conventions, but nevertheless concluded that it was "well worth a look". He awarded the game a score of 77%.

French magazine Génération 4 reviewed Colorado in April 1990, awarding it an overall "Interest" score of 84% on all three platforms. The reviewers praised its graphics (86%) and animation (77%), while the PC version received a noticeably lower sound score (48%) than the Amiga and Atari ST releases (70%). The magazine also rated the game's packaging 8/10 and documentation 7/10. Individual reviewers Jean Delaitre, Frank Ladoire and Stéphane Lavoisard awarded the game scores of 4/5, 4/5 and 5/5 respectively. The reviewers praised Colorado for its graphics, varied gameplay and expansive world, highlighting its more than one hundred explorable locations, numerous optional missions and the combination of adventure and arcade-style canoe sequences. The reviewers also noted the game's freedom of exploration, as some areas could be approached through multiple routes.

Olivier Ka ("Kaaa") of the French magazine Joystick praised Colorado for its realistic graphics, varied environments and successful combination of adventure and arcade gameplay. The review highlighted the game's Western atmosphere, diverse enemies and canoe sequences, while noting that although the adventure mechanics were relatively straightforward, the action sections demanded careful timing and tactical weapon selection. The reviewer compared the game's atmosphere to the works of Jack London and James Fenimore Cooper, awarding the Atari ST version 79%. Reviewing the PC version in the same magazine two months later, Jeff of Joystick considered the graphics colorful and the landscapes attractive despite somewhat jerky animation. He praised the responsive canoeing sequences but found combat more difficult, criticized the weak sound and felt that the adventure elements could have been presented more clearly. The PC version received a score of 70%.

Another French magazine, Micro News, regarded Colorado as another refinement of the action-adventure formula previously used by Silmarils in Targhan, Le Fétiche Maya, and StarBlade, observing that although the studio's games relied on nearly identical mechanics, the formula remained effective. The reviewer praised the game's varied environments, detailed graphics and convincing recreation of the American frontier, also comparing its atmosphere to the novels of London and Cooper. While describing the adventure elements as relatively straightforward, the review commended the variety of weapons, item trading and canoe sequences, concluding that they added excitement to an already engaging adventure.

The German magazine Power Play (magazine) was highly critical of Colorado, arguing that its action-adventure formula was fundamentally unoriginal and that merely transplanting it to a Western setting did little to distinguish it from numerous earlier titles. The reviewer praised the graphics as respectable but criticized the choppy animation, repetitive screen-by-screen progression and cumbersome combat, concluding that the game's limited variety was unable to compensate for its uninspired design. The magazine awarded the Amiga version an overall score of 24%.

Warren Lapworth of British magazine The Games Machine praised Colorado's colorful graphics, realistic scenery and blend of arcade action with exploration, particularly highlighting the canoeing sequences as the game's strongest feature. He also commended the variety of collectible items, trading system and the ability to move both across and into the screen, considering these elements to add depth to the gameplay. However, he criticized the stiff character animation, weak sound and generally slow pace, suggesting that the game would appeal more to players who enjoyed methodical exploration than those seeking constant action. He awarded the Amiga version an overall score of 78%.

French magazine ''Tilt'' awarded ''Colorado'' an interest score of 16/20. Reviewer Olivier Hautefeuille praised the game's varied environments, strategic elements and freedom of exploration, describing it as a rewarding adventure that could keep players occupied for hours. He highlighted the need to plan routes, barter with the travelling merchant Mac Biggle and manage resources carefully. The review also commended the game's realistic landscapes and atmospheric depiction of the American frontier. Criticism focused on the limited strategic depth, repetitive item trading, the need to reload the rifle after every shot, and audiovisual presentation, with the reviewer noting that the animation and sound effects could have been stronger. Despite these reservations, he recommended the game as a worthwhile example of the action-adventure genre.

Reviewing the game for British magazine Zzap!, Robin Hogg and Scorelord praised its detailed graphics, varied exploration, combat, canoeing sequences and replay value, describing it as "a very enjoyable aardvark". They criticized the game's frequent disk access and found its music less impressive than its visuals, but considered its strong atmosphere and exploration more than compensated for these shortcomings. The magazine awarded Colorado an overall score of 79%.

=== 1991 (UK budget release) ===
In 1991, Action 16 budget release received several reviews. Amiga User International described Colorado as a competently made but insubstantial action-adventure. The reviewer considered the canoeing sequences the game's strongest feature and praised the combination of action and puzzle-solving, but criticized the lack of atmosphere, slow disk access and the reliance on loosely connected action sequences rather than a more cohesive adventure. The magazine concluded that the game was worth considering only for players who particularly enjoyed traditional arcade adventures, awarding it 70%.

In a budget review of the Action Sixteen re-release, CU Amiga described Colorado as a well-animated arcade adventure whose puzzles were integrated naturally into the story. The reviewer praised the game's consistent quality, exploration and collectible items, concluding that it was "great fun" despite its straightforward premise. The magazine awarded the budget release an overall score of 84%, higher than for the original release, likely reflecting the new budget price.

The British magazine The One was more negative. Its review described Colorado as a competent but unremarkable action-adventure. The reviewer considered the canoeing sequences the strongest part of the game and praised the three-dimensional presentation, but argued that the game lacked atmosphere and relied on a loose collection of simple action sequences connected together rather than a cohesive adventure. The review also criticized the frequent disk access and concluded that the game would appeal mainly to enthusiasts of traditional arcade adventures. The magazine awarded Colorado two stars out of five (equivalent to 40%).

David Wilson of British magazine Zero reviewed the Action 16 re-release as well, describing it as another strong addition to the label's catalogue. He praised the game's attractive graphics, unusual side-view control system, canoe sequence and the way its adventure and arcade elements combined into a coherent experience. Wilson noted that the controls retained the "usual French weirdness", but concluded that the game successfully tied its varied gameplay together into "a novel arcade adventure", awarding it 78%.

=== Others ===
1991 saw a review and walkthrough published in the Polish Computer Studio magazine (special issue of Amiga Computer Studio). The reviewer, Artur Fijałkowski, described Colorado as one of Silmarils' most successful productions, praising its realistic graphics, convincing atmosphere inspired by the works of James Fenimore Cooper and the faithful recreation of the North American wilderness. He regarded the game as an outstanding representative of the action-adventure genre and highlighted its distinctive audiovisual presentation as one of its greatest strengths.

In 1993 the game was also reviewed for Polish magazine Secret Service. Its reviewer, Jacek Marczewski, described Colorado as a highly atmospheric action-adventure, praising its combination of exploration, combat and trading as well as the variety of locations and challenges. The reviewer also noted that the game rewarded careful planning, observing that some weapons and items should be reserved for specific situations in order to complete the adventure successfully. The magazine awarded the game scores of 90% for graphics, 60% for sound and 90% for playability.

In a retrospective review published in the Polish PC Extreme (special issue of PSX Extreme) in 2025, Patryk Andersz praised the game's graphics, atmosphere and sense of immersion, arguing that its scenic backgrounds had aged remarkably well despite the game's age. Andersz also commended the exploration of forests, mountains and snowy landscapes and considered them the most enjoyable aspect of the game. He noted that the game offers considerably more depth than he had expected from a title of its era. The review criticized the game's limited inventory, sparse sound design and single save slot. Andersz identified the game's greatest weakness as the possibility of rendering it unwinnable by permanently consuming required items before reaching later puzzles, with only one save slot available to recover from such mistakes. He concluded that this significantly lowered his final assessment despite otherwise recommending the game. The magazine awarded Colorado a score of 70%.

== Legacy and significance ==
In a 2023 scholarly analysis, Jakub Majewski argues that the 1801 setting may have been deliberately chosen by the game's French developers to coincide with the brief restoration of French control over Louisiana before its sale to the United States (the Louisiana Purchase). According to Majewski, by the virtue of its very rare setting - depicting the trans-Mississippi frontier before the emergence of the traditional American Wild West - Colorado occupies a unique place among Western-themed video games. Majewski also noted that as of the time he was conducting his research, it was the first of the still one of very few games to depict this setting; the other two being the more famous Assassin's Creed III and its spin-off Assassin's Creed III: Liberation (both from 2012).

He also described the game as an unusually early precursor to later open-world games, arguing that its large interconnected world, branching exploration, and emphasis on navigation anticipated later open-world design despite the technological constraints of its two-dimensional presentation.
