= Ishar 3: The Seven Gates of Infinity =

1994 video game

- Developer: Silmarils
- Publishers: Silmarils: DOS; EU: Daze Marketing; NA: Silmarils; CAN: ReadySoft ReadySoft (Macintosh) Prism Leisure Corporation (Windows)
- Designers: Michel Pernot; Pascal Einsweiler
- Programmers: Jean-François Trevien; Louis-Marie Rocques
- Artists: Eric Galand; Guillaume Maginot
- Composer: Fabrice Hautecloque
- Series: Ishar
- Engine: ALIS (Note: Short for Actor Language Integrated System.)
- Platforms: Amiga, Atari ST, Falcon, Classic Mac OS, MS-DOS, Windows
- Release: 1994: MS-DOS; EU: 1994; NA: 1994; CAN: 1995 Mac; CAN: 1995 Windows; EU: 1999
- Genre: Role-playing game
- Mode: Single-player

Ishar 3: The Seven Gates of Infinity (French: Ishar III: Les sept portes de l'infini) is a role-playing video game developed and published by Silmarils. It was published for MS-DOS in 1994 and Classic Mac OS in 1995. A Windows version followed in 1999. The game is a sequel to Ishar 2: Messengers of Doom.

== Gameplay ==
Atari ST screenshot

The player takes the role of Zubaran (or imports a party of characters from another game in the series), and is tasked with hunting the dragon Sith. To this end, the player must cross a series of gates that lead to different time periods. Each period, like the islands of Ishar 2, has its own climate and type of landscape.

== Release ==
A 3DO version was announced but never released. Cyril Cogordan, a former Silmarils programmer, stated in an interview and on his personal website that a conversion of Ishar 3 was in development for the Jaguar CD, based upon the CD-ROM version released for the Falcon. Despite being completed and sent to Atari Corporation for approval, it was never released due to Atari closing their doors as a result of the commercial and critical failure of the Jaguar.

== Reception ==
Reception

Review scores
Publication	Score
Next Generation	2/5
PC Gamer (US)	74%
CU Amiga	92%
Amiga Computing	80%
Computer Game Review	44/39/62

Reviewing Ishar 3 for PC Gamer US, William R. Trotter wrote, "Hardcore FRPG fans will probably like it—novices will find it tedious, overwhelming, and frustrating." He called the graphics "often breathtakingly beautiful" and "as richly textured as oil paintings", but found the game's reliance on backtracking dull and disliked the high speed of combat.

In CU Amiga, Toby Dillon called Ishar 3 "almost the perfect RPG." He concluded, "All of the right elements from the last two games have been kept, the plot has been improved and the game looks simply incredible." Tina Hackett of Amiga Computing called Ishar 3 "one of the most absorbing and atmospheric adventures around", despite her minor criticisms of its sound. She praised its depth of content and characterization, and considered it "a superb addition to the Ishar series".

Next Generation reviewed the PC version of the game, rating it two stars out of five, and stated that "This is Bard's Tale all over again."
