= Brain Dead 13 =

1995 video game

- Developer: ReadySoft (Note: Ported to CD-i by International Creative Digital Image.)
- Publishers: ReadySoft: MS-DOS; EU: Empire Interactive; PlayStation/Saturn; NA: ReadySoft; JP: Coconuts Japan Entertainment; CD-i; Philips Interactive Media; iOS; Digital Leisure
- Director: David Quesnelle
- Producer: David Foster
- Designers: Riccardo Durante; Richard Carl Livingston
- Programmers: Martin Ross; Igor Divjak
- Artists: Andrew Wolf; Brad Graham; Chad Hicks
- Composer: Brian Jack
- Platforms: MS-DOS: Microsoft Windows; PlayStation; Atari Jaguar CD; Sega Saturn; 3DO Interactive Multiplayer; Mac OS; CD-i; iOS
- Release: 1995: MS-DOS; NA: 15 December 1995; EU: 1995; Windows; NA: 31 January 1996; EU: 1996; PlayStation; NA: 6 March 1996; JP: 18 October 1996; Jaguar CD; NA: 15 March 1996; EU: May 1996; Saturn; NA: 30 September 1996; JP: 10 October 1996; 3DO; NA: 1996; Mac OS; NA: 1996; CD-i; EU: 1997; iOS; WW: 8 October 2010
- Genre: Interactive movie
- Mode: Single-player

Brain Dead 13 is an interactive movie video game developed and originally published in North America by ReadySoft on 15 December 1995 and in Europe by Empire Interactive in the same year for MS-DOS. Unlike Dragon's Lair and Space Ace, which began as laserdisc arcade games, it was only released for personal computers and video game consoles. In the game, players assume the role of young computer expert Lance Galahad to defeat Dr. Nero Neurosis at his castle and its residents. Its gameplay is primarily presented through the use of full-motion video (FMV).

Brain Dead 13 was initially released for the MS-DOS before being ported to other platforms including the 3DO Interactive Multiplayer, Atari Jaguar CD, CD-i, Macintosh, Microsoft Windows, PlayStation and Sega Saturn in 1996 and 1997, with each one featuring various changes and additions compared to the original version. A conversion for the Sega CD was in development but never released. An iOS port was released in 2010.

Brain Dead 13 has been met with negative critical reception from video game magazines and dedicated outlets that have reviewed the game since its original release and later versions.

== Gameplay ==
MS-DOS screenshot

Brain Dead 13 is an interactive movie game reminiscent of Dragon's Lair and Space Ace that uses full motion video (FMV) to present the story and gameplay, which consists entirely of quick time events, where players assume the role of Lance Galahad in order to defeat Dr. Nero Neurosis from conquering the world at his castle and its residents as the main objective. During gameplay, exploration is freer than in most previously released interactive movie games, with most rooms linked to crossroads that leaves the route for finding the Brain Chamber up to the players. Even crossroads are done as quick time events. Failure to choose a path as soon as Lance reaches a crossroads and to use the other actions, as well as choosing the dangerous path, results in the game displaying the failure scenes, in which Lance is killed by Fritz or by other enemies or obstacles or he falls to his doom. The death scenes are often rather violent, but over-the-top in their cartoony approach. However, the player has infinite lives, and after the death sequence, there is a revival sequence, where Lance revives in ways that depend on which scene he was killed in.

== Synopsis ==
=== Plot ===
Lance, a young computer expert, is called to fix a computer at a scary, dilapidated castle. After repairing a large super-computer, Lance learns that his client, the disembodied brain of Dr. Nero Neurosis, has a diabolical plan to take over the world. After calling Dr. Neurosis an "average" mad scientist, he quickly finds himself in trouble, being chased around the castle by Dr. Neurosis' psychotic servant, Fritz. The player must guide Lance through the castle in order to defeat Dr. Neurosis and escape with his life.

=== Characters ===
- Lance Galahad is a young computer expert and a human player character. He has long red hair covered by a baseball cap and is an avid video game junkie. He also has a bit of a smart mouth. Lance is voiced by Riccardo Durante.
- Dr. Nero Neurosis is a mad doctor, now a disembodied brain, whose villainous goal is to rule the world. He sends Fritz off to kill Lance at the beginning of the game because of insulting him by calling him "average" (though he was planning to kill Lance from the beginning, anyway, simply to avoid paying for his repair job). He is voiced by Dave Quesnelle.
- Fritz is a hunchbacked little imp with hooks for hands who carries an array of his deadly gadgets that he uses to kill Lance. His apparent lack of intelligence does not prevent him from being a lethal adversary. Lance is pursued by him throughout the game. He is Dr. Neurosis' "pet" and diligently follows all orders given to him. He is voiced by Joe Giampapa, though Fritz does not speak in any languages at all, but only in grunts and gibberish.
- Vivi is a curvaceous, vampiric vixen with a Southern belle accent who runs a "funeral salon". It is generally an excuse for her to dismember or suck the blood of unwary or unwilling patrons, like Lance. She is voiced by June Brown.
- Moose is a big, dumb, Frankenstein's monster-like giant, who spouts various sports phrases and wields a baseball bat and a football. Moose is encountered as one of the seven "boss" sequences. He is voiced by Blayne Burnside.
- Evil Left Iris and Evil Right Iris are two sister witches who, in their own separate room, try to have Lance "for dinner".

Lance also comes across many other creatures (like man-eating vines, a giant centipede, the Yeti, the Slasher, the marionette, the librarian, the gator cook, etc.) out to kill him in the various dungeons, cellars, rooms, hallways and labyrinth garden in the castle.

== Release ==
Brain Dead 13 was first released for the MS-DOS computers by ReadySoft in North America on 15 December 1995 and later in Europe of the same year by Empire Interactive. The game was later ported to Microsoft Windows and Macintosh computers in 1996, while the 3DO Interactive Multiplayer and Atari Jaguar CD conversions were also released during the same year as with the two aforementioned PC releases. The PlayStation and Sega Saturn versions were launched in 1996 as well, with the Japanese releases of both ports being published by Coconuts Japan Entertainment. In 1997, the title was also converted to the CD-i by International Creative Digital Image and published exclusively in Europe by Philips Interactive Media.

The PC, Saturn and Jaguar CD versions of Brain Dead 13 were compressed onto a single CD-ROM and, as a result, have considerably lower video quality than the 3DO and PlayStation versions, which included two CDs instead. The first disc of the 3DO version comes in two different releases: the original, which is labeled simply "Disc 1", and a version labeled "Disc 1 (v1.1)". The v1.1 disc fixes a bug which sometimes causes the game to crash during Vivi's funeral salon in the original release. The first run of the PlayStation version freezes during startup, making it completely unplayable; as with the 3DO Disc 1, it was succeeded by a working version of the game. European and Japanese releases of the game were given a highly selective dubbing, which retains all non-verbal voice acting from the original actors, even when it appears in the same clip with verbal voice acting. For instance, in the original intro sequence Lance says "Wah ha ha! I'm game!", while the "I'm game!" line is dubbed over with a Japanese translation on the Japanese PlayStation and Saturn versions, but the laughter from the original voice actor is retained. The CD-i version, despite being shipped on a single disc, uses the DVC (digital video cartridge) for high quality MPEG compression and better video quality.

On 8 October 2010, Brain Dead 13 was ported to the iPhone, iPad, and iPod Touch via the App Store, and later upgraded from Version 1.0 to Version 1.1 on 1 December of the same year, which added support for iOS 3.0 and 4.2 and fixed various bugs. In the iOS port the screen turns black for a split second after making a move in certain scenes when Lance looks around, or after failing to make a choice. Also, button icons appear on the corners of the touch screen in an L-shape, with the "Menu" icon on the top left corner, the directional arrow icon on the bottom left, and the circular action button icon on the bottom right; the player can change or toggle the button icons any which way or size via "Settings", as well as turning the audio or visual move guide (which allows the player to quickly press an appropriate button as soon as it lights up in certain areas, making things easier) on or off. However, the icons vanish during death scenes and resurrection scenes, depriving the player of the ability to pause the game during death scenes or to skip resurrection scenes like in the MS-DOS original or all other game console versions. The iOS port, which does not require any CDs, has higher video resolution than any of the earlier versions.

A version for the Sega CD was in development and planned to be published by ReadySoft but it was never officially released, despite being advertised in magazines.

== Reception ==
Reception

Review scores
Publication	Score
AllGame	3.5/5 (3DO)
Electronic Gaming Monthly	9/10, 7.5/10, 7/10, 7/10 (3DO); 4.5 out of 10 (SAT)
EP Daily	3/10 (PC)
Famitsu	20/40 (SAT); 22/40 (PS1)
Game Informer	6 out of 10 (3DO)
GameRevolution	B (SAT)
GameSpot	3.5/10 (PC); 3.8/10 (SAT)
Next Generation	2/5 (PS1)
PC Joker	38% (PC)

Brain Dead 13 was met with mixed to negative reviews, with critics widely praising the animated sequences but bemoaning the trial-and-error gameplay. GameSpot's Jeffery Adam Young said that the game is "a skillfully animated cartoon that is almost entirely unplayable and fails completely as an interactive experience." He noted that the results of button presses are inconsistent and unpredictable. The Electric Playground's John Shaw praised the animated sequences and production value but regarded the gameplay as "tired and abysmal", criticizing the need to repeatedly rewatch sequences as the player figures out the pattern needed to progress. PC Joker's Martin Schnelle commended the audiovisual presentation but stated that its "concept was not well received years ago and is still a sure guarantee of frustration today".

The four reviewers of Electronic Gaming Monthly lauded the game as one of the best of the FMV quick-time event games, thanks to its non-linear gameplay and forgiving difficulty (in that it does not require split-second timing and gives the player unlimited continues). They particularly praised the 3DO version's high quality video and quick loading times, and said the game's one flaw is that it has no replay value. A review in GamePro, in contrast, said the game "is nowhere near as good as Dragon's Lair or Space Ace" and that the 3DO version feels like an unfinished game due to its glitches and control, though they concurred on the high quality of the video. Next Generation found the FMV quick-time event genre to be aging and unenjoyable. The Atari Times's Gregory D. George criticized the sound design but praised the gameplay and quality of the full motion video sequences for being better than Dragon's Lair, as well as the uninterrupted flow of each scene.

GameRevolution's The Terror commended the animated graphics, smooth action, and extensive high quality voice acting. GameSpot's Hugh Sterbakov stated it "makes no improvement in a decade-old genre that never managed to bring its interactive excitement up to the level of its visuals." Electronic Gaming Monthly's review team razed the Saturn version for its low quality FMV, which they found compared extremely poorly to both the 3DO version of the game and to FMV in other Saturn games. Shawn Smith pointed out that the video is the main reason people play quick-time event FMV games, making the poor quality a fatal flaw. Some of the team also complained that the game itself is simply mindless trial-and-error. GamePro similarly said that "the trial and error required to figure out button combinations is far too laborious for the mild comedic payoff that results." They also noted the poor video compression of the Saturn version, which they scored a 1 out of 5 in both control and fun factor, and a 2.5 in graphics and sound.

The game's producer, David Foster, speculated on the reasons for the negative response to the game: "The games being released for PC and console were fully interactive 3D experiences and we were attempting to release a game that didn't fit that mold. It also didn't help that the game's quick time events were so tough and heavily branched that it was challenging as an interactive experience."
