= Robinson's Requiem =

1994 video game

- Atari ST cover art by Tony Roberts
- Developer: Silmarils
- Publishers: Silmarils: PC; NA: ReadySoft; EU: Daze Marketing 3DO; NA: ReadySoft Windows; WW: DotEmu Jaguar CD Original release; NA/EU: Atari Corporation Relaunch; WW: Songbird Productions
- Designer: André Rocques
- Programmers: Jean-François Trevien; Louis-Marie Rocques
- Artists: Christophe Lambert; Eric Galand; Guillaume Maginot
- Composer: Fabrice Hautecloque
- Engine: ALIS (Note: Short for Actor Language Integrated System.)
- Platform: Amiga, Atari ST: Amiga, Atari ST, MS-DOS, Mac OS, 3DO Interactive Multiplayer, Microsoft Windows, Atari Jaguar CD
- Release: 1994: Amiga, Atari ST; EU: 1994 MS-DOS; NA: 1994; EU: 1994 Mac OS; CAN: 1994 3DO; NA: 1996 Windows; WW: 6 January 2009 Jaguar CD; WW: 30 May 2011
- Genres: Survival, simulation
- Mode: Single-player

Robinson's Requiem is a 1994 survival simulation video game developed and originally published by Silmarils exclusively in Europe for the Atari ST, Atari Falcon and Amiga. Taking place in the 22nd century where Earth and colonized planets are facing overpopulation, the game sees players assuming the role of Robinson officer Trepliev 1 from the Alien World Exploration department in his attempt to escape imprisonment from the fictional planet of Zarathustra alongside another AWE Robinson named Nina1, while facing several hostile creatures and dangers in order to survive.

Robinson's Requiem was developed in conjunction with Ishar 3: The Seven Gates of Infinity and made use of Silmarils' proprietary ALIS game engine. Although it was initially released for the Atari ST, Atari Falcon and Amiga microcomputer platforms, the game was later ported to other home computers and consoles including the PC, Macintosh, 3DO Interactive Multiplayer and Atari Jaguar CD, some of which were released by various publishers across multiple regions and each featured several changes and additions compared to the original versions. The Jaguar CD port was cancelled, but received a homebrew release in 2011 by Songbird Productions. A conversion for the Amiga CD32 was also planned, but never released.

Robinson's Requiem has been met with mixed reception from critics since its initial release. The Atari ST and Atari Falcon versions received praise for their presentation, graphics, sound design and gameplay, but was criticized for being difficult to newcomers, slow pacing and steep learning curve. Similarly, the Amiga version garnered praise for its graphics, sound and gameplay, but received criticism for the low framerate and difficulty curve. The PC versions were met with a more divided reception from video game magazines and dedicated outlets who felt divided in regards to several aspects, including the level of complexity and difficulty for players. A sequel, Deus, was released in December 1996 only on PC. It has since been re-released on compilations for modern PC platforms through download services such as Good Old Games.

== Gameplay ==
Atari ST version screenshot.

Robinson's Requiem is a survival simulation game, similar to Wilderness: A Survival Adventure and UnReal World, that takes place from a first-person perspective. Players assume the role of Robinson officer Trepliev 1 from the Alien World Exploration department whose main objective is to escape from the prison planet Zarathustra alongside another AWE Robinson named Nina1. Together they must face several hostile creatures and dangers and survive the planet's harsh alien environment for long enough. The player uses the game's systems to monitor the Trepliev 1's health status, perform surgery and create makeshift tools. Players must also keep track of hunger, thirst, fatigue, temperature and the character's health, which is displayed on its dedicated screen. Multiple statuses are also shown, depending on the actions taken during gameplay. Many actions require the completion of everyday tasks such as eating, drinking and sleeping, as well as hunting, cooking, gathering and finding a place to rest. The player uses a freely movable mouse cursor to interact with the environment and the icon-based interface on the heads-up display (HUD) when not engaged in combat.

== Synopsis ==
Robinson's Requiem takes place in the year 2163, where Earth and colonized planets are facing overpopulation by humans. A military force known as the Alien World Exploration (AWE) and its Robinsons explore potential planets across the universe that are suitable for colonization, requiring a rigorous training process and their task lasts for five years until the mandate is finished. However, a secret service organization known as Scientific Intelligence (SI) issued orders that certain Robinsons cannot return to Earth to avoid foreign viruses, but officer Trepliev 1 and other Robinsons eventually discover the organization's actions. Trepliev 1 and his crew are tasked with exploring an unknown planet as their last mission before retiring, but the team's spacecraft was sabotaged to crash-land on the location, which is revealed to be a prison planet called Zarathustra.

== Development ==
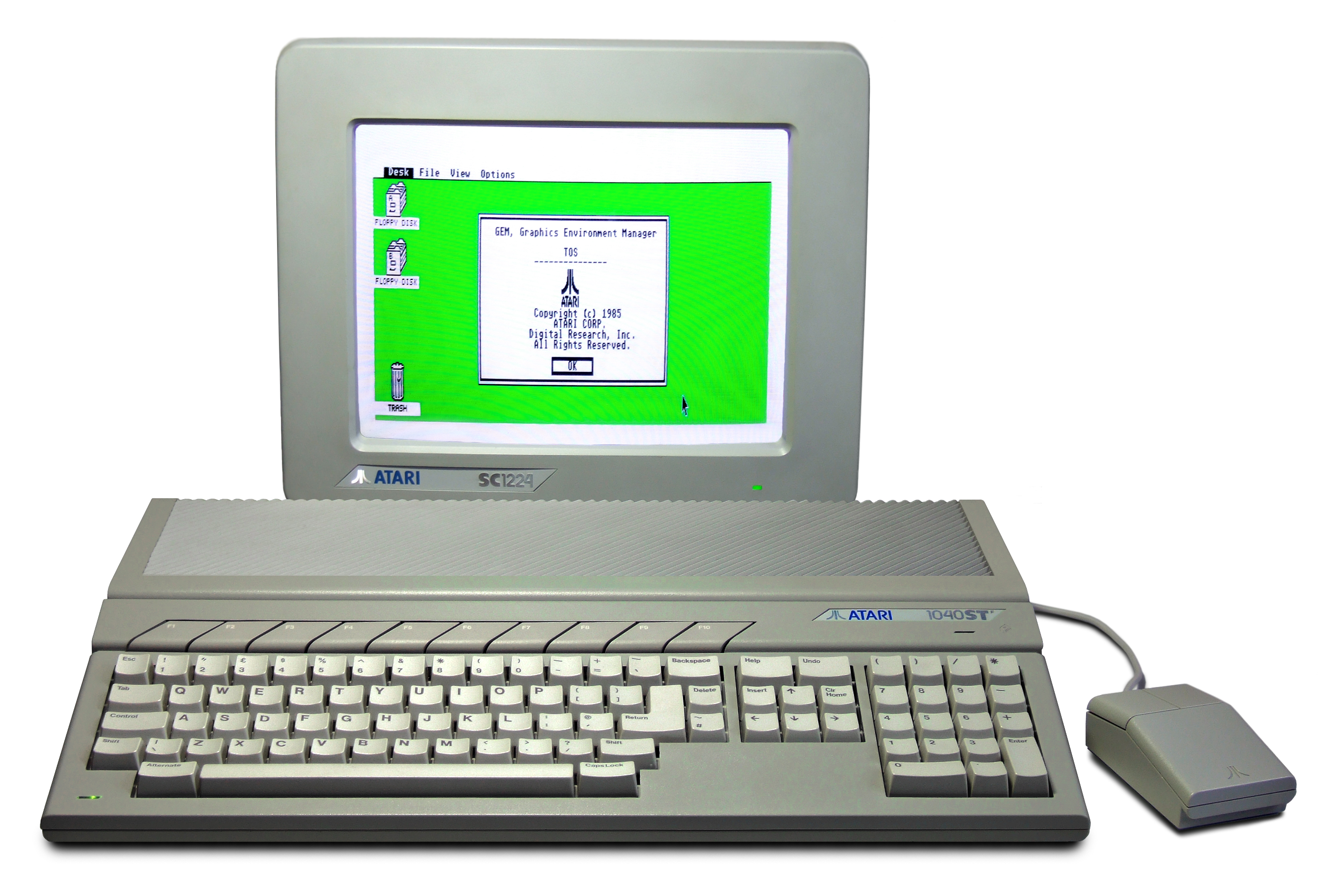
Robinson's Requiem was created alongside Ishar 3: The Seven Gates of Infinity for the Atari ST.

Robinson's Requiem was developed in tandem with Ishar 3: The Seven Gates of Infinity and made use of Silmarils' proprietary ALIS game engine created by the company's co-founder Louis-Marie Rocques, which allowed the team to port the game more easily from Atari ST to other platforms. The project was headed and designed by Silmarils co-founder André Rocques, who also shared the role of programmer alongside his brother Louis-Marie, Jean-François Trevien and composer Fabrice Hautecloque. The artwork was created by artists Christophe Lambert, Eric Galand, Guillaume Maginot, Nicolas Meylaender and Pascal Einsweiler, among other people collaborating in its development.

The 3D landscapes in Robinson's Requiem are rendered using texture-mapped voxels, similar to NovaLogic's Comanche and its Voxel Space engine, while elevation value to represent a specific height from a flat terrain were pre-calculated with interpolation and features multiple special effects. The sprites were pre-rendered using 3D Studio.

David Ingels and Cyril Cogordan were responsible for porting Robinson's Requiem to the 3DO Interactive Multiplayer and the Atari Jaguar CD add-on respectively. When converting and testing the game on the Jaguar CD, Cogordan stated both on an interview and his personal web page that the system was not capable of rendering voxel visuals, an issue Ingels also faced during the 3DO conversion process, prompting both programmers to display the visuals with texture-mapped polygons instead while writing the engine on each console as well. Cogordan was also responsible for adapting the title to Atari Falcon on CD-ROM and Macintosh.

== Release and ports ==
3DO version screenshot.

Robinson's Requiem was originally published by Silmarils exclusively in Europe for the Atari ST, Atari Falcon and Amiga in 1994. The Atari Falcon version was released on diskettes and CD-ROM, with the latter featuring full motion video cutscenes. The game was later released for PC and Macintosh by ReadySoft in North America and Europe by Daze Marketing, featuring minimal changes compared to the original versions and has since been re-released on compilations for modern PC platforms through download services such as Good Old Games. The 3DO Interactive Multiplayer version was originally announced for a February 1995 release by ReadySoft, but due to extensive delays, it was not released until 1996, only in North America, and became one of the last games released for the system. Though it features the same full motion video cutscenes as the CD-ROM release for Atari Falcon, the visuals are now rendered with polygons instead of voxels.

The Atari Jaguar CD version was first announced in late 1994 as one of the three titles Silmarils intended to release for the add-on, including its then-in development sequel Deus and Ishar 4: Ishar Genesis. The Jaguar CD port was originally intended to be published during the second quarter of 1995, but was rescheduled for an August/Q3 1995 release instead. Despite being completed and sent to Atari Corporation for approval, it was never released due to Atari Corp. closing their doors as a result of the commercial and critical failure of the Atari Jaguar platform until it was picked up for distribution by Songbird Productions and released on 30 May 2011. As with the 3DO version, this version features the same FMV cutscenes and visuals are rendered with polygons instead of voxels. A version for the Amiga CD32 was in development by Silmarils and planned to be published in May 1994. However, it was never released for unknown reasons.

== Reception ==
Reception

Review scores
Publication	Score
AllGame	3/5 (PC)
Amiga Computing	75% (Amiga)
Amiga Format	82% (Amiga)
Amiga Power	39% (Amiga)
Amiga User International	85% (Amiga)
Computer Gaming World	2/5 (PC)
Joystick	90% (A1200); 94% (PC)
Micromanía	83% (PC)
PC Gamer (UK)	40%
PC Gamer (US)	49% (PC)
PC Games (DE)	78% (PC, Disk); 79% (CD)
PC Zone	85 / 100 (PC)
ST Format	89% (Atari ST); 90% (Falcon Disk); 72% (Falcon CD)
ST Review	84% (Atari ST); 86% (Falcon)
Aktueller Software Markt	10 / 12 (PC)
Amiga Concept	91% (Amiga)
Amiga Dream	91% (Amiga)
Amiga Games	62% (Amiga)
Amiga Joker	72% (Amiga); 78% (A1200)
Atari Inside	88% (Atari ST)
CU Amiga	86% (Amiga)
Génération 4	57% (A1200); 90% (PC); 68% (PC)
The One for Amiga Games	81% (A1200)
PC Joker	85% (PC)
PC Player	68 / 100 (PC)
Play Time	60% (Amiga); 65% (PC Disk); 64% (PC CD)
Power Play	64% (PC)
Score	70% (PC)
Strana Igr	4- / 10 (3DO)

Critical reception of Robinson's Requiem was mixed. Many reviewers noted its poor graphics and high system requirements, and some found the game to be boring. However, several critics, including those from CU Amiga and Amiga Computing, believed that the game's originality overrode other complaints.

CU Amiga's Tony Dillon was impressed by its freeform item combination system, but was disappointed by the Amiga version's graphics and performance. However, he finished his review by saying, "If you want something new that will completely blow your brain, then this could well be the game for you". Jonathan Maddock of Amiga Computing also disliked the game's graphics and system requirements, but praised the game as "an entirely new gaming experience". Amiga Format's Dale Bradford noted "just wandering around, exploring and discovering how long you can stay alive is enjoyable, thanks to the non-linear gameplay", and to the "care and thought" that went into the game. All three reviewers noted the game's high level of difficulty.

Rich Pelley of Amiga Power, however, found the game to be extremely boring; he likened playing it to "being told to paint a fence and [...] discover[ing that] it's fifteen miles long". He also criticized its graphics and performance, and noted that the game's survival systems amounted to "lots of bars and charts and electrocardiograms, and not much action". The game also received poor reviews from both PC Gamer UK and PC Gamer US, who found the game frustrating and uninviting, and criticized its graphics.

== Legacy ==
A sequel, Deus, had already been announced for the Atari Jaguar CD by the time Robinson's Requiem was released. It was released in 1996 on all regions only for PC to mixed reception.
