= Crystals of Arborea =

1990 fantasy role-playing video game

- Cover art for the game.
- Developer: Silmarils
- Publisher: Silmarils
- Designer: Michel Pernot; Pascal Einsweiler
- Series: Ishar
- Platforms: Amiga, Atari ST, MS-DOS
- Release: 1990; 1993 (Budget); 2009 (Compilation)
- Genre: Role-playing video game
- Mode: Single-player

Crystals of Arborea is a medieval fantasy role-playing video game developed and published by Silmarils, and released in 1990 for the Amiga, Atari ST and MS-DOS. The game is a precursor to the Ishar trilogy, a series also produced by Silmarils, and together they were re-distributed as the Ishar Compilation in 2009.

== Gameplay ==
The game is set upon the island kingdom of Arborea, the remnant of a world all but destroyed. According to the in-game mythology, Mogroth, the deity of chaos, became furious following his banishment from the pantheon of gods. In his rage, he instilled chaos in the minds of the populace and encouraged them to rebel. Orcs and Black Elves were amongst those who converted and chose to follow Mogroth. Unwilling to allow their creations to be subjugated, the remaining deities flooded the world and drowned all but those few who now dwell on Arborea. The four elemental crystals, of earth, fire, water and air respectively, are all that now guard against the ultimate subjugation of the kingdom by the forces of chaos.

The player assumes the role of Jarel, the last Prince of the Sham-nirs, an elf-like species that inhabits Arborea. Gameplay centres on locating the four crystals, restoring them to their corresponding temples, before defeating Mogroth, the deity of chaos. To accomplish this, the player must form a party of up to six allies, such as wizards, fighters and rangers, each with different strengths and weaknesses. Using both a 3D perspective and a 2D map of the island, players can divide their forces and direct them to perform reconnaissance of a given area. Clues as to the locations of the crystals can be obtained from certain neutral non-player characters, but only if the player is able to answer their riddles or solve puzzles. According to Silmarils, there are approximately 16,000 locations to explore, though not all need to be visited in order to obtain the crystals and restore order.

Should the allies happen upon aggressive creatures or Mogroth's forces, the perspective switches to a 2D grid system. Each character is represented on the grid, but must be positioned so that they have a clear line of sight to their target before they can attack. Rangers and wizards both have the greatest line of sight, whereas swordsmen can only attack if adjacent to their opponent. Prior to obtaining the final crystal, players must battle Mogroth via the grid system. If victorious, Jarel is able to place the last crystal in position and ultimately purge the island of chaos.

== Reception ==
Reception

Review scores
Publication	Score
CU Amiga	91% (Amiga)
Amiga Action	86% (Amiga)
The One	86% (Amiga)
Amiga Power	48% (Amiga)

Upon its initial release, Crystals of Arborea received mixed reviews. Some critics praised the graphics and user-interface, remarking, for instance, that the "characters and other creatures are well-drawn and accompanied by some superb, realistic looking, background artwork." The music and sound effects were also singled out as impressive. Amiga Action acknowledged the developer's attempt to blend strategy and role-playing genres, and noted the influence of Dungeon Master on the game. However, the combat system received mixed reactions, with several commentators comparing battles to repetitive games of chess or draughts. Amiga Action described the combat system as "innovative", whereas Amiga Power commented that the battles were "strange, grid-based strategic affairs," which lacked any violence or pace. Ishar: Legend of the Fortress was released in 1992, prompting the publishers to re-distribute Crystals of Arborea as a budget title in 1993. The re-release received markedly poorer reviews, owing largely to improvements made by its successor.

The One gave the Amiga version of Crystals of Arborea an overall score of 86%, praising Crystals' UI, calling it a "simple and friendly front-end that doesn't get in the way of the atmosphere." The One also praises Crystals' graphics and music, expressing that characters are "well-drawn" and backgrounds are "superb" and "realistic looking", and notes that Crystals' music has a 'very medieval feel' which "complements the action perfectly." The One furthermore calls Crystals of Arborea "rich and rewarding."
