= Guy Spy and the Crystals of Armageddon =

1992 video game

- Developer: ReadySoft
- Composer: Mark Knight
- Platforms: Amiga, Atari ST, CDTV, Classic Mac OS, MS-DOS
- Release: 1992: Amiga, Mac, MS-DOS; 1993: Atari ST, CDTV
- Genre: Action
- Mode: Single-player

Guy Spy and the Crystals of Armageddon is an action game by ReadySoft that was published for Amiga, Classic Mac OS, and MS-DOS in 1992. Versions for the Atari ST and CDTV were published in 1993. Guy Spy is a cartoon adventure similar to Dragon's Lair and Space Ace.

== Plot ==
Guy is summoned before the chief of international security and informed that the evil Baron Von Max has located the whereabouts of the legendary Crystals of Armageddon. Max needs these crystals to power the doomsday machine he has constructed in the mountains at an unknown location.

== Reception ==
Computer Gaming World praised the graphics and the variety of gameplay in the 13 levels, concluding that it "does a great job of providing thrills for the average arcade player".
