= Targhan =

1989 video game

- Developer: Silmarils
- Publishers: Silmarils, Loriciel (Amstrad CPC and Atari ST)
- Designers: Michel Pernot, Pascal Einsweiler
- Artist: Peter Andrew Jones,
- Writer: Christophe Fagot
- Composer: Michel Jean Baillot
- Platforms: MS-DOS, Amiga, Atari ST, Amstrad CPC (1990), Macintosh (1991)
- Release: 1989
- Genre: Hack and slash
- Mode: Single-player

Targhan is a side-scrolling hack and slash action-adventure game developed and published for MS-DOS, Amiga, and Atari ST by Silmarils and released in 1989. Color Dreams had announced plans for a Genesis port but it has not been released.

In 1996 an IBM PC CD-ROM re-release was published under Action Sixteen.

The character Targhan is also a playable character in the Ishar series.

The cover features an illustration by Peter Andrew Jones.

== Plot ==
The player controls Targhan, a sword wielding barbarian from the village of Edengarhn. The long dead wizard Athna-An appeared in his dream to sing to him about the legend of the castle of the Evil One, a powerful creature that keeps a secret. He leaves his wife and village to travel through the mountains of Clorg and the forest of Luneclare. On the way to this goal, the player needs to solve puzzles and combat hostile demons, warriors and dragons.

== Gameplay ==
The player can move, jump and crouch and perform various kick and swordthrust or throw collectable shuriken.

Special items can be collected by crouching. Besides shuriken there are bottles, stone tablets, a red box, a sparkling stone, and the necklace to collect and use to trigger special events.

== Reception ==
Info magazine gave the Amiga version of Targhan an overall score of 4.5 out of 5, beginning their review by stating that Targhan is "one of the best entries in the field".

Joystick rated the Amstrad version 92%, bestowing its "Megastar" award concluding it "can be compared with the best".

ACE was more critical, calling all versions dull, bland and mediocre.
