= Metal Mutant =

1991 video game

- Developer(s): Silmarils
- Publisher(s): Silmarils
- Designer(s): André Rocques
- Platform(s): MS-DOS, Amiga, Atari ST
- Release: 1991
- Genre(s): Action-adventure
- Mode(s): Single-player

Metal Mutant is a side-scrolling action-adventure game developed and published for MS-DOS, Amiga, and Atari ST by Silmarils and released in 1991. The game allows the player to transform at any time into three different robot forms: Cyborg, Dino, and Tank.

The cover features an illustration by John Bolton.

== Plot ==
The player controls Metal Mutant, the ultimate battle machine, which was sent to the heavily protected high-tech planet Kronox to find and destroy the tyrant AROD 7. On the way to this goal, the player needs to solve puzzles and combat hostile lifeforms and enemy robots.

== Gameplay ==
Right from the start the player has a possibility to instantly transform into 3 mechanical robots, each possessing unique abilities:

Cyborg

- From the start: Jump, Recharge, Trident
- Later: Axe, Grappling Hook, Energy Blast

Dino

- From the start: Bite, Flame, Flame Tail
- Later: Shield, Remote Mechanical Fly, Bionic Eye

Tank

- From the start: 360° Laser Gun
- Later: Heavy Torpedo, Boss Energy Signature Detector

The only feature that is common to all robots is the Turbomutant, in the last screens of the game. Upgrades are performed either by finding and picking them up as modules, or programming via terminals.

== Development ==
According to an April 1991 issue of The One, Metal Mutant was originally subtitled Clash of the Tin Cans, and is inspired by the wargame board game BattleTech.

At the fan festival Jaguar Connection 2003, Silmarils co-founder Louis-Marie Rocques stated that an Atari Lynx port was developed and completed but the release was cancelled by Atari Corporation.

== Reception ==
The One gave the Amiga version of Metal Mutant an overall score of 85%, beginning their review by stating that "Metal Mutant is initially disappointing: all you do for the first few screens is match appropriate manoeuveres to combat situations and keep plugging away until your enemies are destroyed. If you begin to persevere however, you begin to discover the game's appeal: horrible puzzles, 40 different types of monster to defeat and a variety of weapons and gadgets to acquire." The One calls Metal Mutant a "130-screen test of memory and joystick dexterity" and praises its "good" graphics, further expressing that Metal Mutant has "a host of excellent animation sequences".
