= Deus (video game) =

1997 video game

- North American cover art
- Developer(s): Silmarils
- Publisher(s): NA: ReadySoft; EU: Silmarils
- Producer(s): Louis-Marie Rocques
- Programmer(s): André Rocques; Louis Elmer; Marc Bourlon
- Artist(s): Arnaud Beaume; Eric Galand; Guillaume Maginot
- Composer(s): Fabrice Hautecloque
- Platform(s): MS-DOS; Microsoft Windows
- Release: January 1997
- Genre(s): Survival, simulation
- Mode(s): Single-player

Deus is a 1997 survival simulation game developed by Silmarils and published by ReadySoft. It is the sequel to Robinson's Requiem.

== Story ==
The player again assumes the role of Robinson's Requiem protagonist Officer Trepliev, who has become a bounty hunter for the Alien World Exploration department and has to save a scientific research station from a group of terrorists called the New Crusaders.

== Gameplay ==
Like Robinson's Requiem, the game features complex health monitoring and surgery systems; however, the game now contains an optional "action mode", which removes these systems.

== Release ==
Prior to its release on DOS and Windows, the game was originally in development for the Atari Jaguar CD under the working title Deus Ex Machina and was planned to be published around the fourth quarter of 1995, however, this early version was never released.

== Reception ==
Deus' critical reception was mixed. Computer Gaming World found the realism of the simulation mode to be overwhelming, and described the game's action mode as "dull". PC Gamer US's Scott Wolf said that the game's "[i]rritations [...] outweigh any enjoyment you might find". PC Gamer UK offered a dissenting opinion; despite calling the initial learning curve "alpine", the reviewer wrote, "After a while [...] Deus suddenly starts being fun. You begin to get the hang of the interface, and start to get into the plot".
