= Ishar: Legend of the Fortress =

1992 video game

- Developer(s): Silmarils
- Publisher(s): EU: Silmarils; UK: Daze Marketing (Amiga)
- Designer(s): Michel Pernot; Pascal Einsweiler
- Programmer(s): André Rocques; Louis-Marie Rocques; Michel Pernot
- Artist(s): Jean-Christophe Charter; Pascal Einsweiler
- Writer(s): André Rocques; Louis-Marie Rocques; Michel Pernot
- Composer(s): Fabrice Hautecloque
- Series: Ishar
- Engine: ALIS (Note: Short for Actor Language Integrated System.)
- Platform(s): Amiga, Atari ST, Macintosh, MS-DOS, Atari Falcon
- Release: Amiga, Atari ST, Macintosh, MS-DOS: EU: April 1992; UK: July 1992 (Amiga); Atari Falcon: EU: November 1992
- Genre(s): Role-playing game
- Mode(s): Single-player

Ishar: Legend of the Fortress is a 1992 role-playing video game developed and published by Silmarils for the Amiga, Atari ST, Macintosh, MS-DOS, and Atari Falcon home computers. It is the first entry in the Ishar trilogy.

== Gameplay ==
Atari ST version screenshot

Ishar: Legend of the Fortress takes place on the island of Kendoria. At the beginning, the player controls a warrior called Aramir, and he must defeat Krogh, an evil sorcerer who has killed lord Jarel. The game takes its name from Krogh's fortress, Ishar, whose name means "unknown" in the game's fictional elf language. In order to achieve this, the player's characters must travel across the whole island and, among other things, meet with the surviving companions of Jarel.

Most of Ishar takes place in an outdoor environment, which was original for computer roleplaying games of the time. It also featured a unique system to change the lineup of player characters: the player can have up to five characters at the same time, but each one will like or dislike his comrades. These preferences come into play when the player tries to recruit or dismiss a character, because the other characters will then vote for or against the recruitment or dismissal. If a character cannot be dismissed by a vote, it is possible for the player to have him assassinated by another character, but there is a risk that other characters will murder the murderer himself, possibly creating a chain of murders that slays the whole party but one.

This opus was the only one of the series that in order to make a save game the player had to pay 1000 gold pieces from the party's inventory.

== Reception ==
Nicholas Bavington for Page 6 said "I can't recommend this game enough to those of you who enjoy a good hack and slash. To those who don't but enjoy blasting things get it anyway – you'll be hooked in minutes."

Rob Mead for ST Format said "The Falcon version of Ishar: Legend of the Fortress is identical to the ST version in almost every respect – only the enhanced sound and graphics enable you to tell them apart."

Amiga Action said "Noticeably distinguished in the graphics area, Ishar: Legend of the Fortress plays almost as well as it looks."

Henning Vahlenkamp for Amazing Computer said "As the first AGA-specific RPG, Ishar is a rather good effort. Its straightforward control should appeal to those put off by traditional games in this genre."

Zero said "most of all, it's the exciting sense of adventure (encompassing over 100,000 screens) that makes Ishar incredibly smart."
