= Storm Master =

1991 video game

- Developer(s): Silmarils
- Platform(s): Amiga, Atari ST, MS-DOS
- Release: 1991
- Genre(s): Turn-based strategy

Storm Master is a 1991 turn-based strategy video game for the Amiga, Atari ST and MS-DOS, produced by the now-defunct French developer Silmarils. It placed the player as the head of government for a fictional semi-medieval country.

Storm Master takes place on a European-fantasy world. Gameplay revolves around the governance and management of the country of Eolia in an ongoing war against its neighbour, Shaarkania, with the ultimate goal of sacking (and, by inference, destroying) all enemy cities.

== Gameplay ==
The game is a blend of turn-based strategy interspersed with live-action battles. This takes the form of aerial battles against enemy air fleets or air defences and requires the player to launch ballistic missiles against enemy ships or batteries. Other real-time elements of the game have the player conducting a religious ceremony with the goal of increasing the natural wind energy of the nation. This element of gameplay is enhanced by requiring the player to dispatch government ministers around the country to develop or industrialise various aspects of the state.
