= Wrath of the Demon =

1991 video game

- Developer: Abstrax
- Publisher: ReadySoft
- Programmers: David Foster, Pierre Proulx, Martin Ross (Amiga) & Nicolas Chapados (PC)
- Artists: Claude Pelletier & Stephane Ross
- Composer: David Whittaker
- Platforms: Atari ST, Amiga, CDTV, MS-DOS, Commodore 64
- Release: 1991
- Genre: Hack and slash
- Mode: Single-player

Wrath of the Demon is a 1991 hack and slash video game developed by Quebec-based developer Abstrax, and published by ReadySoft. Versions for Atari ST, Amiga, Commodore CDTV, and MS-DOS were released in early 1991. A Commodore 64 version was released later. A Sega Genesis port was in development, but cancelled.

== Plot ==
The player controls a hero on a quest to defeat a demon.

== Development ==
The nine musical tracks are by David Whittaker. The programmers for the Amiga version were David Foster, Pierre Proulx and Martin Ross. The programmer for the PC version was Nicolas Chapados. The game was designed and illustrated by Claude Pelletier and Stephane Ross. Also Michel Cadorette provided support during the production of the Amiga version in different areas.

== Reception ==
Reception

Review scores
Publication	Score
ACE	884/1000 (Amiga)
The One	79% (Amiga)

ACE gave the Amiga version of Wrath of the Demon an overall score of 884 out of 1000, calling it better than Shadow of the Beast II, stating that Wrath of the Demon is "technically ... the most accomplished and polished game yet written for the Amiga". ACE praised Wrath of the Demon's 'smooth' scrolling during horseback sequences.

British gaming magazine The One gave the Amiga version of Wrath of the Demon an overall score of 79%, and expressed that while it suffers from "repetitive" gameplay, Demon has "excellent presentation". Further praising its "superlative" graphics, The One praised Wrath of the Demon's parallax scrolling, "classy" animation, and "atmospheric" sound. The One compared Demon's emphasis on graphics and action gameplay to Shadow of the Beast, and expressed that while its gameplay is linear and 'unoriginal', it's 'substantial' and appealing.
