= Le Fétiche Maya =

1989 video game

- Developer: Silmarils
- Publisher: Silmarils
- Platforms: Amiga; Atari ST; DOS
- Release: 1989
- Genre: Action-adventure

Le Fetiche Maya is a 1989 French action adventure game by Silmarils.

== Critical reception ==
Generation 4 previewed the game in their Issue 15.

Raze magazine wrote that the game was an entertaining example of the action-adventure genre. ASM Magazine concluded "there is absolutely no feeling in this game." Joystick suggested the game would suit "lovers of exotic adventure". Generation 4 noted the title seamlessly transitions between a "graphic, animated...adventure game" and a "jeep driving simulation phase". MegaOcio wrote it "can rub shoulders perfectly with other classics of the same class." MicroMag felt it "skilfully mixes scenery and action".

Amiga Games rated it 58%.
