= Asghan: The Dragon Slayer =

1998 video game

- Developer: Silmarils
- Publishers: Grolier Interactive; Ubi Soft
- Composer: Dominique Voegelé
- Platform: Microsoft Windows
- Release: December 1998
- Genre: Action-adventure
- Mode: Single-player

Asghan: The Dragon Slayer is a 1998 hack-and-slash action role-playing game developed by Silmarils and released in December 1998. The player takes on the persona of Asghan, a warrior prince who swears to avenge the death of his father by dragons. The game is praised for smooth integration of action and role-playing elements as well as a wide array of enemies and weapons. However, it suffers from a lack of character development and awkward controls.

== Story ==
When the prosperous land of Brightmoon faces a pernicious threat in the form of dragons invading from the neighboring Isle of Kyrk, the warrior prince Asghan begins a perilous journey to counter the attack. The dragons themselves are spurred along by the evil sorcerer Morghan. Asghan embarks on his journey both to avenge his father as well as protect his land.

== Gameplay ==
Asghan attacking an enemy with a sword. The bottom left corner shows his health.

Asghan: The Dragon Slayer is characterized largely by physical puzzles (running, jumping, crawling) as well as typical fantasy elements such as spellcasting and exorcism. Apart from being agile and magically proficient, Asghan is also able to use an array of different weapons. He employs these skills in a series of dungeons and arenas, including a ferocious female dragon's dungeon, a green dragon's dungeon, an iceberg, a forest, and a witch's cavern.

== Influences ==
Like most modern fantasy franchises, Asghan: The Dragon Slayer is filled with elements from J. R. R. Tolkien's The Lord of the Rings story. Throughout the game, the player encounters Hobbits, Orcs, Elves and great Eagles resembling those found in Tolkien's works.

== Reception ==
Reception

Review scores
| Publication | Score |
|---|---|
| Hyper | 75/100 |
| PC Zone | 50% |

PC Gaming World's Mat Peck gave Asghan a score of 8/10. He called it "a great game".
