= USS Colorado =

USS Colorado may refer to the following ships of the United States Navy:

- USS Colorado (1856), a three-masted steam screw frigate in commission from 1858–1876
- USS Colorado (ACR-7), a Pennsylvania-class armored cruiser in commission from 1905–1927
- USS Colorado (BB-45), a Colorado-class battleship in commission from 1923–1947
- USS Colorado (SSN-788), a Virginia-class nuclear-powered fast attack submarine commissioned in 2018, in active service

In fiction:

- USS Colorado (SSBN-753), a fictional Ohio-class submarine featured in the 2012 TV series Last Resort
