= Colorado, Mitchells Plain =

Suburb of Cape Town, in Western Cape, South Africa

Colorado
- Location within Western Cape Location within South Africa
- Coordinates: 34.027°S 18.592°E
- Country: South Africa
- Province: Western Cape
- Municipality: City of Cape Town
- Main Place: Mitchells Plain, Cape Town

Area
  - Total: 0.38 km^{2} (0.15 sq mi)

Population (2011)
  - Total: 1,442
  - Density: 3,800/km^{2} (9,800/sq mi)

Racial makeup (2011)
  - Black African: 3.40%
  - Coloured: 82.65%
  - Indian/Asian: 0.35%
  - White: 0.07%
  - Other: 0.14%

First languages (2011)
  - Afrikaans: 15.13%
  - English: 96.05%
  - IsiXhosa: 1.60%
- Time zone: UTC+2 (SAST)

Colorado is a neighbourhood in the north western part of the Mitchells Plain urban area of the City of Cape Town in the Western Cape province of South Africa.
