= Colorado Trading & Clothing =

American textile company

Colorado Trading & Clothing CO
- Industry: retailers textile industry
- Headquarters: Denver, Colorado

The Colorado Trading & Clothing CO is an American company operating in the textile industry. The company is based in Denver, Colorado. The company was involved in a controversy where it was alleged that they were importing textiles from Burma even when it was under sanctions for human rights violations.

Their product was sold by Spaulding, and included shirts with a Bush-Cheney logo sold by the website for the Bush campaign for President in 2004. The story received international attention.
