= Cerro Colorado =

Cerro Colorado is Spanish for red mountain/hill. It may refer to:

== Europe ==
- Cerro Colorado mining deposit, in Huelva, Spain.

== North America ==
- Cerro Colorado (Baja California), mountain in Tijuana, Mexico
- Cerro Colorado (borough), Tijuana, Baja California, Mexico
- Cerro Colorado, Arizona, a ghost town in Arizona, U.S.
- Cerro Colorado Mountains, a mountain range in Arizona, U.S.

== South America ==
- Cerro Colorados, a mountain in the Andes of northwestern Argentina
- Cerros Colorados Complex, in Neuquén, Argentina
- Cerro Colorado mine, a copper mine in northern Chile
- Cerro Colorado (volcano), a volcano in northern Chile
- Cerro Colorado Formation, west of Chile Chico in Chilean Patagonia
- Cerro Colorado District, a district in Arequipa, Peru
- Cerro Colorado, a burial site of the Paracas culture in Peru; see Paracas National Reserve § Protected status
- Cerro Colorado, officially Alejandro Gallinal, in Uruguay
