= Colorado, Rio Grande do Sul =

Municipality in Brazil

Coordinates: 28°31′26″S 52°59′38″W

- Municipality
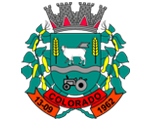
- Flag Coat of arms
- Interactive map of Colorado, Rio Grande do Sul
- Country: Brazil
- Time zone: UTC−3 (BRT)

Colorado is a municipality in the state of Rio Grande do Sul, Brazil. As of 2020, the estimated population was 3,130.

== See also ==
- List of municipalities in Rio Grande do Sul
