= Silmarils (company) =

French computer game developer (1987–2003)

- Industry: Video game
- Founded: 1987; 39 years ago
- Founders: Louis-Marie Rocques; André Rocques
- Defunct: 2003
- Fate: Bankruptcy
- Headquarters: France

Silmarils was a French computer game software company founded in 1987 by Louis-Marie and André Rocques. It produced games for PC, Amiga, Amstrad CPC, Macintosh, Atari ST and Atari Falcon.

The company is most closely associated with its Ishar series. Crystals of Arborea was one of the first games to feature a real-time 3D environment and a large world with very few limits on movement. The company went bankrupt in 2003, and in 2004 the Rocques brothers and another former Silmarils member, Pascal Einsweiler, founded a new studio called Eversim, specializing in political strategy games.

The company was named after J. R. R. Tolkien's Silmarils.

== Games ==
- 1987
  - Manhattan Dealers
- 1988
  - Mad Show
- 1989
  - Le Fetiche Maya
  - Targhan (planned for Sega Genesis)
  - Windsurf Willy
- 1990
  - Colorado (planned for Sega Genesis)
  - Crystals of Arborea
  - Star Blade (planned for Sega Genesis); also known as Starblade
- 1991
  - Boston Bomb Club
  - Metal Mutant
  - Storm Master
  - Xyphoes Fantasy
- 1992
  - Bunny Bricks
  - Ishar I: Legend of the Fortress
- 1993
  - Ishar II: Messengers of Doom
  - Transarctica
- 1994
  - Robinson's Requiem
  - Ishar 3: The Seven Gates of Infinity
- 1996
  - Deus
- 1997
  - Time Warriors
- 1998
  - Asghan: The Dragon Slayer
- 2001
  - Arabian Nights
  - Les Visiteurs: La Relique de Sainte Rolande
- 2003
  - Inspector Gadget: Mad Robots Invasion
- unknown
  - Asghan 2
