= Ishar =

Video game series

- Compilation edition
- Genre(s): Role-playing
- Developer(s): Silmarils
- Publisher(s): Silmarils
- Spin-offs: Amiga, Atari ST, Macintosh, MS-DOS

Ishar is a series of three role-playing video games by Silmarils for IBM PC compatibles, Amiga, Atari ST, and Macintosh. They are preceded by Crystals of Arborea. The games are played in first-person perspective, with all but Crystals of Arborea allowing the player to direct a group of five characters, each with a selectable race, gender, and class.

== Crystals of Arborea ==
Crystals of Arborea was published by Silmarils in 1991. It precedes Ishar both chronologically and by its gameplay. Morgoth, the main antagonist of Crystals of Arborea, is the father of Krogh, the one of Ishar: Legend of the Fortress. Moreover, most of the heroes of the game, Jarel's companions, can be met in Ishar or even in Ishar 2.

== Ishar: Legend of the Fortress ==
The first game in the series came out in 1992 on Amiga, Atari ST and DOS. It takes place on the island of Kendoria. At the beginning, the player controls a warrior called Aramir, and he must defeat Krogh, an evil sorcerer who has killed lord Jarel. The game takes its name from Krogh's fortress, Ishar, whose name means "unknown" in the game's fictional elf language. In order to achieve this, the player's characters must travel across the whole island and, among other things, meet with the surviving companions of Jarel.

== Ishar 2: Messengers of Doom ==
Ishar 2 was published in 1993 on Amiga, Atari ST and DOS. In Ishar 2, the player starts with the character of Zubaran, who is the new lord of Ishar. He receives a vision that tells him to defeat the sorcerer Shandar. It is also possible to import a party of characters from the first Ishar. The game now takes place on an archipelago, each island bearing the name of one of Jarel's companions. Each island also features a different type of landscape: Irvan's island is covered with swamps, Akeer's and Olbar's are underground complexes, Zach's island is covered by a city, Jon's is mountainous, and Thorm's has treetop gangways in a forest.

This game has a combat system that's more ergonomic than in the first Ishar, and a day-night cycle in which shops are closed at night and the nightclub is closed by day. It also adds a bank. Saving the game does not remove gold from the player anymore.

== Ishar 3: The Seven Gates of Infinity ==
Ishar 3 was published in 1994. The player starts with Zubaran or imports characters from another game of the series, and has to hunt the dragon of Sith. In order to do that, he needs to cross a series of gates, each one sending him to a different time period. Each period, like the islands of Ishar 2, has its own climate and type of landscape.

== Ishar 4: Ishar Genesis ==
A fourth game in the series, Ishar 4, was in development and announced in 1995 for the Atari Jaguar CD under the working title Ishar Genesis. It was intended for a December 1995 release but development was discontinued for unknown reasons. Former Silmarils programmer Cyril Cogordan stated that ideas created for the unreleased fourth installment were later implemented in Asghan: The Dragon Slayer, released three years later.
