= Commodore 64 Games System =

Video game console

Commodore 64GS
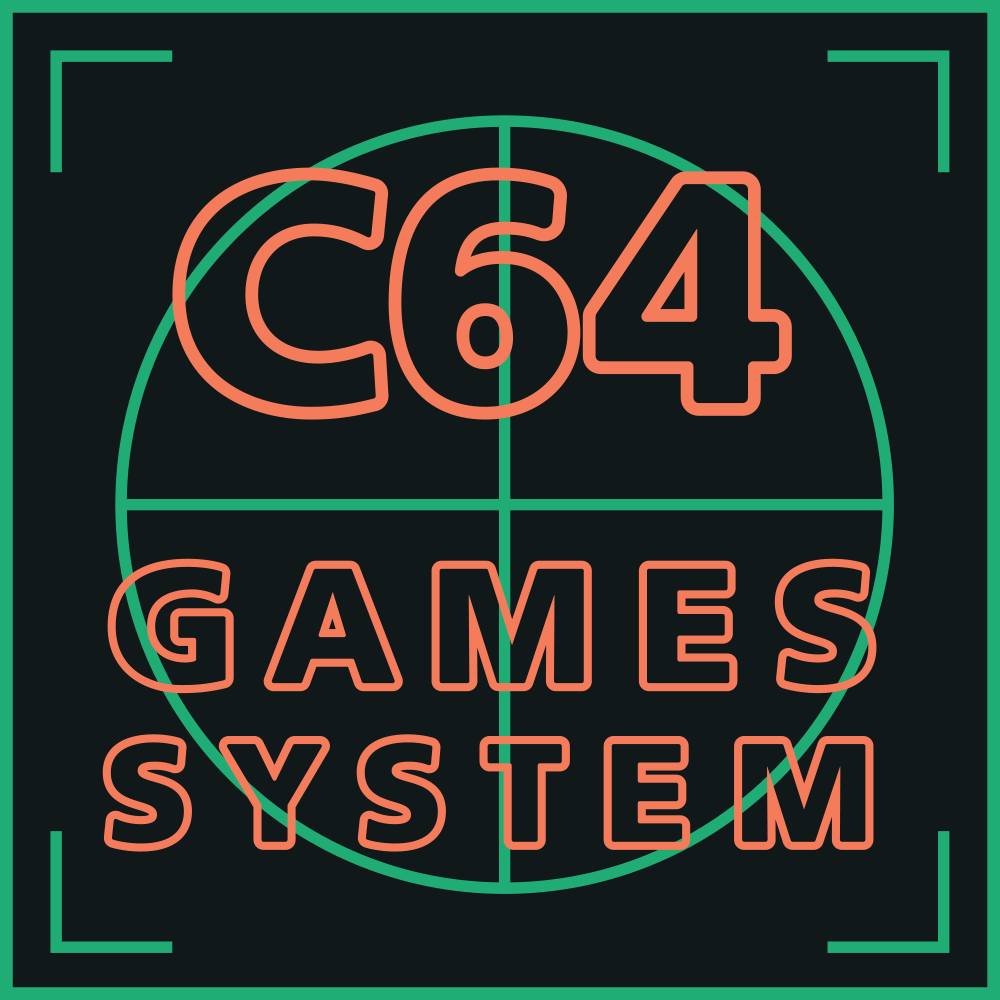

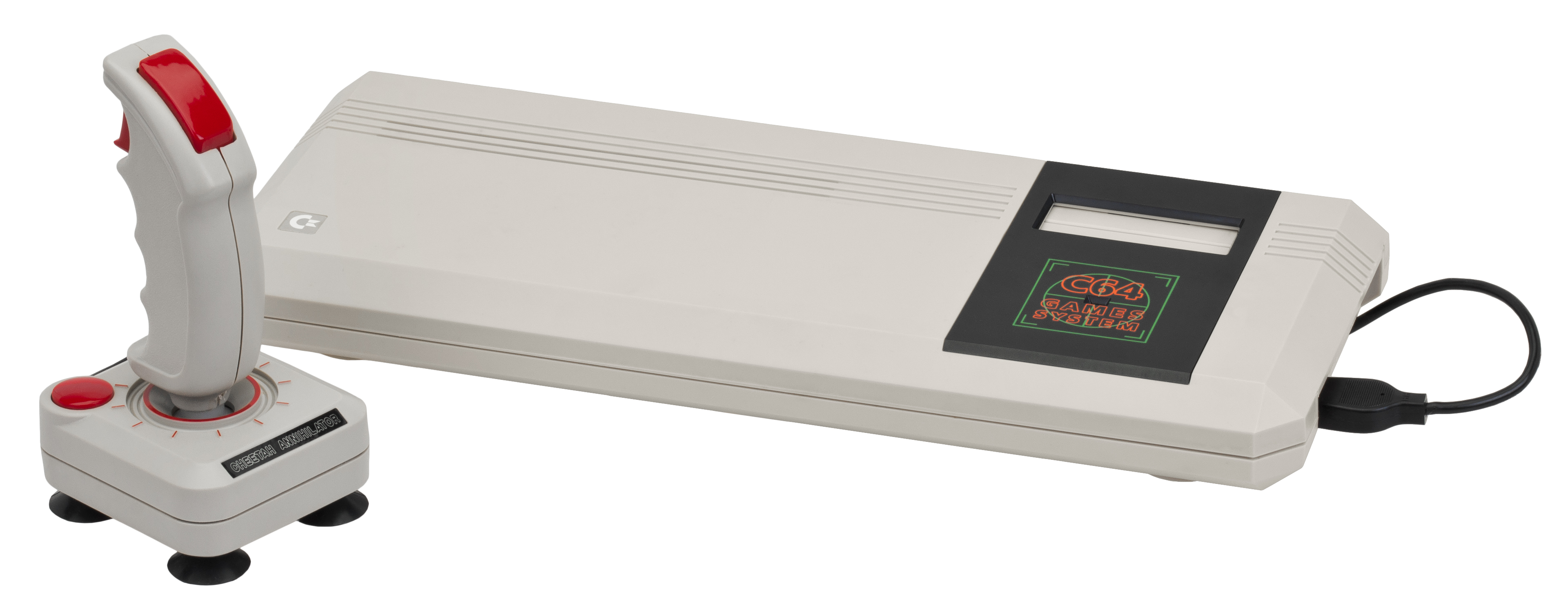
- Also known as: C64GS
- Manufacturer: Commodore International
- Type: Home video game console
- Generation: Third
- Released: December 1990; 35 years ago
- Introductory price: £99 (equivalent to £240 in 2025)
- Units sold: ≈2000
- Units shipped: ≈20,000
- Media: Cartridge
- Predecessor: MAX Machine
- Successor: CDTV

The Commodore 64 Games System (often abbreviated C64GS) is the cartridge-based home video game console version of the popular Commodore 64 home computer. It was released in December 1990 by Commodore into a booming console market dominated by Nintendo and Sega. It was only released in Europe and was a considerable commercial failure. The C64GS came bundled with a cartridge containing four games: Fiendish Freddy's Big Top O'Fun, International Soccer, Flimbo's Quest, and Klax.

The C64GS was not Commodore's first gaming system based on the Commodore 64 hardware. However, unlike the 1982 MAX Machine (a game-oriented computer based on a very cut-down version of the same hardware family), the C64GS is internally very similar to the complete Commodore 64, with which it is compatible. Out of the approximately 20,000 consoles produced, only 2000 consoles were sold.

The initiative to release a console based on the Commodore 64 was claimed by Commodore UK and, in particular, Steve Franklin, reportedly requesting the development of a games machine to be sold more cheaply than the Commodore 64. Such a machine was to be launched at a £99 price point, at a time when the Commodore 64 itself sold for £159. It was envisaged that children wanting only to play games on a Commodore 64 would accept a console version of the computer with more limited application at a lower price. Reminiscent of Commodore's strategy several years earlier, it was also envisaged that a low-cost console would "fracture the console sector" and "put a block on Sega and Nintendo's aspirations".

== Available software ==
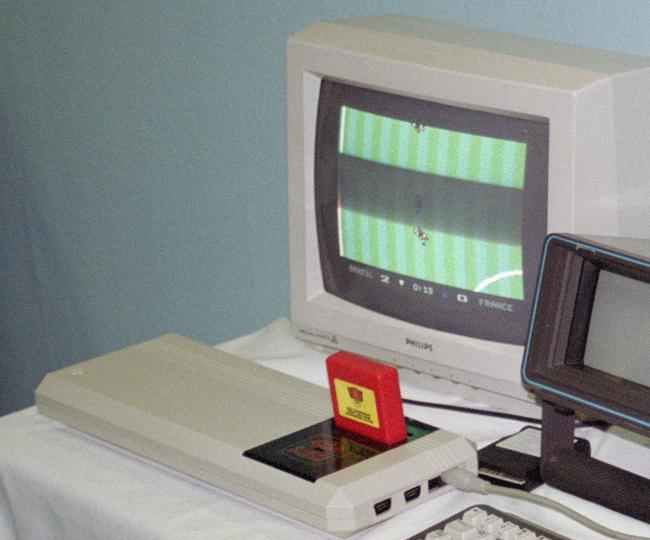

Support from games companies was limited, as many were unconvinced that the C64GS would be a success in the console market. Ocean Software was the most supportive, offering a wide range of titles, some C64GS cartridge-based only, offering features in games that would have been impossible on cassette-based games, others straight ports of games for the original C64. Domark and System 3 also released a number of titles for the system, and conversions of some Codemasters and MicroProse games also appeared. Denton Designs also released some games, among them Bounces, which was released in 1985.

The software bundled with the C64GS, a four-game cartridge containing Fiendish Freddy's Big Top O'Fun, International Soccer, Flimbo's Quest and Klax, were likely the most well known on the system. These games, with the exception of International Soccer, were previously ordinary tape-based games, but their structure and control systems (no keyboard needed) made them well-suited to the new console. International Soccer was previously released in 1983 on cartridge for the original C64 computer.

Ocean produced a number of games for the C64GS, among them a remake of Double Dragon (which was only sold at trade shows), Navy SEALS, RoboCop 2, RoboCop 3, Chase HQ 2: Special Criminal Investigation, Pang, Battle Command, Toki, Shadow of the Beast and Lemmings. They also produced Batman The Movie for the console, but this was a direct conversion of the cassette game, evidenced by the screens prompting the player to "press PLAY" that briefly appeared between levels. Some of the earliest Ocean cartridges had a manufacturing flaw, where the connector was placed too far back in the cartridge case. The result was that the cartridge could not be used with the standard C64 computer. Members of Ocean staff had to manually drill holes in the side of the cartridges to make them fit.

System 3 released Last Ninja Remix and Myth: History in the Making, although both were also available on cassette. Domark also offered two titles, Badlands and Cyberball, which were available on cartridge only.

Through publisher The Disc Company, a number of Codemasters and MicroProse titles were also reworked and released as compilations for the C64GS. Fun Play featured three Codemasters titles: Fast Food, Professional Skateboard Simulator and Professional Tennis Simulator. Power Play featured three MicroProse titles: Rick Dangerous, Stunt Car Racer and MicroProse Soccer, although Rick Dangerous was produced by Core Design, not MicroProse themselves. Stunt Car Racer and MicroProse Soccer needed to be heavily modified to enable them to run on the C64GS.

Commodore never produced or published a single title for the C64GS beyond the bundled four-game cartridge. International Soccer was the only widely available game for the C64GS but had actually been written for the C64.

== Hardware-based problems ==
The C64GS was plagued with problems from the outset. Firstly, despite the wealth of software already available on cartridge for C64, the lack of a keyboard means that most cannot be used with the console. This means that much of the cartridge-based C64 software, while fundamentally compatible with the C64GS, was unplayable.

To partially compensate for the lack of a keyboard, the basic control system for the C64GS was a joystick supplied by Cheetah called the Annihilator. This joystick, while using the standard Atari 9-pin plug, offers two independent buttons, with the second button located on the base of the joystick. The joystick standard is fundamentally compatible with the ZX Spectrum's Kempston Interface and the Master System, but no other joystick on the market offered compatibility with the proprietary second-button function. Standard C64 joysticks and Master System controllers were fundamentally supported, but the lack of second-button support (the Master System's second button did not function in the same way) meant that the Cheetah Annihilator was essential for playing certain titles such as Last Ninja Remix and Chase HQ 2.

However, it was poorly built, had a short life, and was not widely available, making replacements difficult to come by.

== Primary reasons for failure ==
Prior to the console's release, Commodore had generated a great deal of marketing hype to drum up interest in an already crowded market. Zzap!64 and Your Commodore, Commodore 64 magazines of the era, reported that Commodore had promised "up to 100 titles before December", even though December was two months from the time of its writing. In reality 28 games were produced for the console during its shelf life - most of which were compilations of older titles, and a majority of which were from Ocean. Of those 28 titles, only 9 were cartridge-exclusive titles, the remainder being ports of older cassette-based games.

While most of the titles that Ocean announced did appear for the GS (with the notable exception of Operation Thunderbolt), a number of promises from other publishers failed to materialize. Although Thalamus, The Sales Curve, Mirrorsoft and Hewson had expressed an interest, nothing ever materialized from these firms. Similar problems plagued rival company Amstrad when they released their GX4000 console the same year.

There were other reasons attributed to the failure of the C64GS, the major ones being the following:

- Poor software support: Most of the existing software on cartridge did not function well with the C64GS, and enthusiasm from publishers was low. Ocean Software, Codemasters, System 3, MicroProse and Domark developed titles for the system, but probably only because the games were compatible with the original C64, providing the titles with a commercial safety net in case the C64GS failed. And failure to reprogram the games for use with the cut-back system was another blame for the fault.
- The C64 computer: The C64GS was essentially a cut-back version of the original Commodore 64, and the games developed for it could also be run on the original computer. The C64 was already at an affordable price, and the C64GS was sold for the same. People preferred the original C64, particularly since the cassette versions of games could often be picked up for a fraction of the cost of the cartridge versions.
- Obsolete technology: The C64 was introduced in 1982.
- An already saturated console market: The 8-bit C64GS entered the market in 1990, parallel to 16-bit fourth generation consoles such as the Mega Drive and the Super Nintendo Entertainment System. The Nintendo Entertainment System and Master System were already dominating the market with more popular titles, and did so until around 1992.
- TV hookup, joystick support and cartridge slots were already found on regular C64 machines. Hence normal C64s were already recognized as "game consoles" despite actually being home computers with integrated keyboards.
- Compatibility: The C64GS games can be run on C64.

Commodore eventually shipped the four-game cartridge and Cheetah Annihilator joysticks in a "Playful Intelligence" bundle with the standard Commodore 64C computer. Several years later, Commodore's next attempt at a games console, the Amiga CD32, encountered many of the same problems.

== Technical specifications ==
The specifications of the C64GS are a subset of those of the regular C64; the main differences being the omission of the user port, serial interface, and cassette port. Since the system board is a regular C64C board these ports are actually present, but simply not exposed at the rear.
