= Jim Power =

Jim Power may refer to:

== Games ==
- Jim Power in Mutant Planet, a 1992 platform game for the Amiga, Atari ST and Amstrad CPC
- Jim Power: The Lost Dimension in 3-D, a 1993 platform game

== People ==
- Jim Power (economist), Chief Economist at Friends First and commentator in Ireland's media
- Jim Power (hurler) (1895–1998), Irish hurler for Galway
- Jim Power (Gaelic footballer), Irish Gaelic footballer
