= Val d'Isère Skiing and Snowboarding =

1994 video game

- Developer: Virtual Studio (Note: Music and sound effects by Teque London.)
- Publisher: Atari Corporation
- Producer: Bill Rehbock
- Programmers: Dragan Nestoroski; Olivier Richez; Philippe Olive; Vincent Baillet
- Artists: Constantin Maschas; Philippe Tesson
- Composer: Stephen Morgan
- Platform: Atari Jaguar
- Release: NA: December 1994; EU: January-February 1995
- Genre: Sports
- Modes: Single-player, multiplayer

Val d'Isère Skiing and Snowboarding is a 1994 sports video game developed by Virtual Studio and published by Atari for the Atari Jaguar. It is a conversion of the sports game Tommy Moe's Winter Extreme: Skiing and Snowboarding (Note: Known in Europe as Val d'Isère Championship and in Japan as Ski Paradise with Snowboard (スキーパラダイス with スノーボード, Sukī Paradaisu with Sunōbōdo).), released that same year for the Super Nintendo Entertainment System (SNES). In the game, the player participates in freeriding, training, and competition at the Val d'Isère ski resort, controlling either a skier or a snowboarder. Its gameplay takes place from a third-person perspective.

Val d'Isère Skiing and Snowboarding was produced by Bill Rehbock, who worked on Jaguar titles such as Wolfenstein 3D and Doom (1993), with Virtual Studio's Olivier Richez as project lead and co-programmer. Loriciel producer Vincent Baillet began working on the project with the goal of understanding and fully utilizing the Jaguar's capabilities. Since the Jaguar's hardware was different from the SNES, everything originally created for Tommy Moe's Winter Extreme had to be rewritten from scratch. However, Loriciel went bankrupt during production, until the Arcynvest Group acquired a majority stake in the company and renamed it Virtual Studio.

Val d'Isère Skiing and Snowboarding received mixed reviews: its graphics, controls, and frenetic pace were praised, but most had mixed opinions about the sound. Some critics also pointed out the game's steep learning curve and lack of variety in its gameplay. By 1995, the game had sold 9,751 copies.

== Gameplay ==
Like Tommy Moe's Winter Extreme: Skiing and Snowboarding, Val d'Isère Skiing and Snowboarding is a winter sports game, described as a ski/snowboard simulator. The game takes place at the Val d'Isère ski resort. The player can choose between a skier or a snowboarder, both with the same speed and maneuverability. The player can access a settings screen to adjust the controls. Additional settings can be accessed by entering a cheat code on the main options screen. The game also offers a two-player option which allows two players to compete by alternating turns.

The player character, a snowboarder, performs a stunt after jumping from a ledge on a slope, while another ledge approaches

The player begins descending the slope once the signal at the starting line is green. The action unfolds behind the skier/snowboarder from a third-person perspective. The player can accelerate or decelerate, jump, turn, make sharp turns, and stop. When executing a mega jump from a ledge, the player character will perform a stunt. The player must avoid various obstacles during the descent, such as trees, rocks, barriers, snowplows, and other skiers. Colliding with other skiers will slow the player character down, but hitting an obstacle will cause a wipeout. The player can dodge obstacles by jumping, but cannot move while doing so. Changes in slope conditions, such as ice rinks, mud puddles, and stream crossings, will cause the player to descend faster or slow down almost to a standstill, respectively. The player must stay on the slope, as veering into the deep snow will cause a decrease in speed. If the player veers off the slope, an arrow will indicate the correct direction to avoid getting lost.

There are three different game modes to choose from: Freeride, Training, and Compete. Freeride is an arcade-style mode where the goal is to reach the finish line within a time limit. The player must reach several checkpoints to gain extra seconds before time runs out. If the player misses a checkpoint, the time limit remains, resulting in a premature end to the run. The slope can be split, allowing the player to choose between two routes. Once the finish line is crossed, a ski lift will take the player to the top of the next slope. There are a total of seven slopes in Freeride mode, all of them progressively more difficult and which must be unlocked. Later slopes in Freeride mode feature collectible power-ups, such as time multipliers, speed boosts, jump boosts, and shields that protect the player for a limited time.

Training is a time trial mode in which the player practices their skills in three disciplines: downhill, giant slalom, and slalom. Each discipline offers four different slopes, all progressively more difficult. The player descends the slope to achieve the best possible time while positioning themselves between the gates. In downhill, the gates are wider, while in both types of slalom, the gates are narrower. If a gate is missed, a two-second penalty is added to the final record for each one missed. In Compete mode, the player participates in four championships, each of which consists of three rounds depending on the type of event chosen: downhill, giant slalom, or slalom. The player advances in the competition based on their finishing time. In the first round, they must finish in the top 7 to qualify; in the second, in the top 5; and in the third and final round, in the top 3. The player will receive a trophy for finishing in the top three and advance to the next championship; once all four championships are completed, they will move on to the finals. The player has a limited number of attempts to qualify, and the game is over once all attempts are exhausted.

== Development ==
Val d'Isère Skiing and Snowboarding for the Atari Jaguar is a conversion of the sports game Tommy Moe's Winter Extreme: Skiing and Snowboarding, which was released in 1994 for the Super Nintendo Entertainment System (SNES). The game was created by French developer Virtual Studio, formerly known as Loriciel, which also developed Tommy Moe's Winter Extreme. In 1993, Loriciel signed an agreement with Atari to become a third-party developer for the Jaguar. However, Loriciel had been facing financial difficulties since 1990, stemming from the challenges of entering the console market, both in terms of development and publishing, which ultimately led the company to declare bankruptcy. In 1994, the Arcynvest Group acquired a majority stake in Loriciel and renamed it Virtual Studio, retaining most of its existing staff, with the aim of expanding software development to other platforms.

Val d'Isère Skiing and Snowboarding was produced by Bill Rehbock, an Atari producer who worked on Jaguar titles such as Wolfenstein 3D and Doom (1993), with Olivier Richez of Virtual Studio as project lead. Richez had previously worked on Tommy Moe's Winter Extreme with Philippe Tesson and Loriciel producer Vincent Baillet. Richez was also responsible for the game's programming alongside Dragan Nestoroski and Philippe Olive. Tesson and Constantin Maschas handled the game's graphics, with Vincent Duranton and Cyril Masquillière providing additional artwork. It was one of Masquillière's first works in the video game industry, before participating as an artist in Ubi Soft titles such as POD (1997) and F1 Racing Simulation. The music was scored by Stephen Morgan of Teque London, who later composed the soundtrack for World Tour Racing.

According to Baillet, he began working on the project with the main task of understanding and getting the most out of the Jaguar, which proved challenging since the console's hardware was different from that of the SNES, which meant that everything originally done for Tommy Moe's Winter Extreme had to be rewritten from scratch. Baillet worked on the display of the slopes and sprites, as well as the sound playback, while Richez, Tesson, and team handled the bulk of the work. Val d'Isère Skiing and Snowboarding runs at 60 frames per second (fps), compared Tommy Moe's Winter Extreme on the SNES running at 25 fps. Baillet considered the Jaguar's hardware to be peculiar, with many ingenious features and some significant limitations, but stated that both he and Richez enjoyed that kind of challenge, and regretted that Loriciel's bankruptcy occurred during production. Following Loriciel's bankruptcy, Baillet moved to Psygnosis in 1994, where he served as studio manager in Paris.

== Release ==
Val d'Isère Skiing and Snowboarding was first unveiled in a promotional recording sent by Atari to video game retail stores on November 14, 1994, with a planned release date of early December 1994, before Christmas. Atari first published the game for the Jaguar in North America in December 1994, followed by Europe between January and February 1995. In France and Spain, it was distributed by Accord and Products Final respectively. The game was also distributed in Japan by retailer Messe Sanoh.

== Reception ==
Reception

Review scores
Publication	Score
Game Informer	5.5/10
GameFan	88/100, 83/100, 88/100
Next Generation	2/5
Atari Explorer Online	2.5/5
Atari Gaming Headquarters	2.5/5
The Atari Times	72%
Electronic Games	C+
Entertainment Weekly	B+
Games World	30/100
Ultimate Future Games	66%
VideoGames	8/10

According to internal documentation from Atari, Val d'Isère Skiing and Snowboarding sold 9,751 copies by April 1995. The game received mixed reception from critics. (Note: Attributed to multiple references: Consoles +, Joypad, Player One, Video Games, Jaguar, Play Time, STart Micro, Excalibur, ST-Computer, ST Magazine, Game Power, Superjuegos, Hobby Consolas, and neXGam.)

GamePro's Sarah Nade stated that Val d'Isère Skiing and Snowboarding excellently showcased the Atari Jaguar's graphical capabilities, citing the large sprites and photorealistic background. Nade also praised the smooth controls and the sound effects, but felt the music was fairly standard and noted that beginners might struggle to keep up with the game's frenetic pace. Dave Halverson and Nicholas Dean Des Barres of GameFan considered it a quality title, lauding the fluid scaling of the visuals. They also commended the controls, but felt the music, while good, was a tad cheesy and noted its steep learning curve due to the frantic gameplay. Entertainment Weekly's Bob Strauss highlighted the game's presentation and highly responsive controls. VideoGames' Jim Loftus was impressed with the game's breakneck pace and felt that this was what made it fun. He also commented that while the sound effects were good, they were not particularly impressive, and noted the lack of variety in the gameplay.

Game Zero Magazine praised Val d'Isère Skiing and Snowboarding its crisp graphics, good music and controls, although the publication noted that it requires practice to master. Electronic Games' Bill Kunkel commended the lavish background graphics, solid character animations, and controls, but felt the game was somewhat tedious due to the limited movement. The Atari Times' Adrian Mroczko stated that, while the game's visuals were good, it was easy to lose sight of the track and out-of-bounds areas due to the sprites that made it up not being compactly spaced, the color scheme itself, and the roller coaster-like hill effect. He also opined that the controls were adequate for beginners but unresponsive at more advanced slopes, the soundscapes were unremarkable, and the two playstyles offered little differentiation. Ultimate Future Games asserted that the game looked better and moved faster compared to Tommy Moe's Winter Extreme: Skiing and Snowboarding on the SNES, but pointed out the lack of variety in the gameplay.

Game Informer commended the game's smooth graphics and addictive gameplay, but noted the lack of a split-screen multiplayer mode, as well as the lack of variety in tricks and jumps. Atari Explorer Online's Timothy Wilson gave positive comments about the game's audiovisual department and controls, but considered its gameplay, while addictive, to be run-of-the-mill. Atari Gaming Headquarters's Keita Iida opined that Val d'Isère Skiing and Snowboarding was a marked improvement over its SNES predecessor, Tommy Moe's Winter Extreme, than most other 16-bit conversions on the Jaguar. However, he felt that the different modes did not offer enough variation to give the game longevity, and criticized the choppy animations and wahsed out sprites. Next Generation argued that the game would not stand the test of time, citing a lack of variety in the gameplay. Games World panned the game for its uninspired gameplay, appalling audio, and lack of a proper map for the slopes. Author Andy Slaven opined that the game was not good, despite considering that several aspects were better than those of its SNES predecessor.
