= GX4000 =

1990 video game console

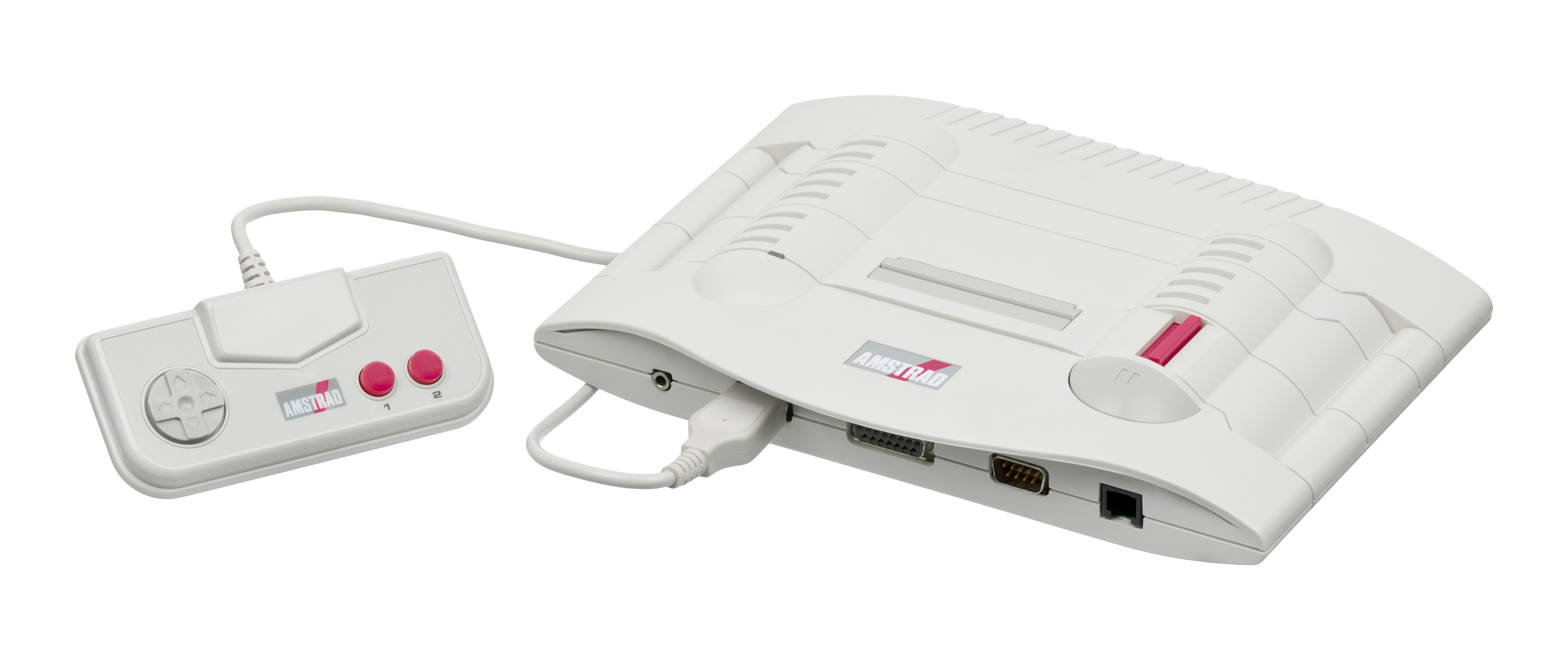
- GX4000 with gamepad
- Manufacturer: Amstrad
- Type: Home video game console
- Generation: Third
- Lifespan: EU: September 1990
- Discontinued: 1991
- Units sold: 15,000
- Media: ROM Cartridge
- CPU: Z80 @ 4 MHz
- Memory: 64 kB RAM, 16 kB VRam
- Display: RGB and composite out 160×200, 16 colours 320×200, 4 colours 640×200, 2 colours 12-bit colour depth
- Graphics: ASIC
- Sound: AY-3-8912
- Best-selling game: Burnin' Rubber

The GX4000 is a home video game console developed and marketed by Amstrad. It was released exclusively in Europe in September 1990, and was the company's only attempt at entering the console market. As part of the third generation of consoles, it was the first British-manufactured programmable games console.

Development was based heavily on Amstrad's existing CPC Plus home computer range, with which it shared hardware architecture. This allowed for an easier transition of software, although many of the console's games were direct ports with minimal enhancements. The system featured improved graphical capabilities compared to earlier Amstrad computers and came with custom-designed gamepads, a sleek futuristic design, and support for RGB output—a feature uncommon among consoles at the time.

Despite its technical advantages and a marketing budget of £20 million, the GX4000 sold poorly. Critics and consumers cited its limited and unimpressive game library, many of which were simplistic CPC ports, as a major drawback compared to the richer offerings from Sega and Nintendo. The console was discontinued within a year of release, and it has since become a curiosity of British gaming history, often cited as an example of a commercial failure in the home console market.

== History ==
=== Background ===
By 1989, Amstrad was facing significant financial and commercial challenges, with profits falling sharply from £160 million to £76 million over the course of the year. The company encountered difficulties across several key areas, including disappointing performance of the PC2000 line, declining sales of its video recorder range, and a decision to withdraw from the audio systems market. In addition, the once-popular Amstrad CPC home computer range was showing signs of stagnation after six years on the market, with its appeal waning in the face of advancing technology and changing consumer preferences.

In response to these difficulties, Amstrad's chairman Sir Alan Sugar announced in April 1990 that the company would embark on an ambitious strategy to introduce a new product every month in an effort to revitalise its position in the consumer electronics market. As such, the company decided to foray into the burgeoning home video game console sector. At the time, the console market in Europe was becoming increasingly competitive. Sega's Master System and the Nintendo Entertainment System were gaining footholds in the United Kingdom, whilst rival Commodore were reportedly preparing to release their own console based on the popular Commodore C64. Against this backdrop, Amstrad saw an opportunity to leverage their expertise in home computing to enter the console market with a product that could compete with these established brands.

=== Development ===
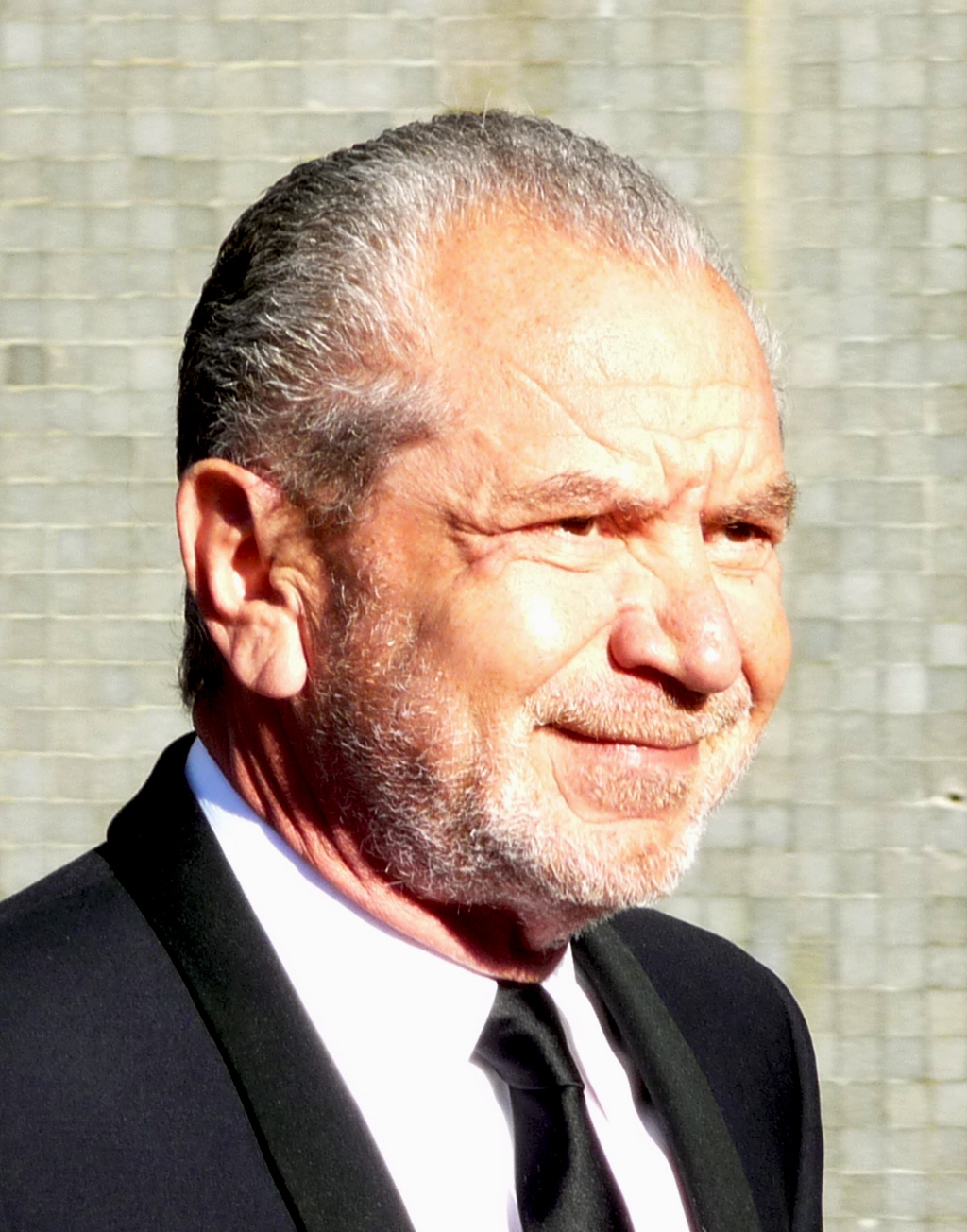
Lord Alan Sugar, owner of Amstrad, pictured in 2009.

The console's development was heavily influenced by the company’s existing line of Amstrad CPC home computers, particularly the CPC Plus range which was released concurrently. Rather than creating an entirely new hardware platform, Amstrad opted to repurpose and slightly enhance the CPC architecture for use in a dedicated console format. In order to bring the GX4000 to market as efficiently and cost-effectively as possible, Amstrad based the console on existing 8-bit CPC architecture. However, with increasing competition from Nintendo, Sega, and 16-bit home computers such as the Amiga 500 and Atari ST, the company recognised the need to enhance the system’s capabilities to remain competitive. As a result, the GX4000 incorporated hardware features not present in the standard CPC range, including support for hardware sprites, smooth scrolling, and an expanded 4,096-colour palette. According to programmer Stuart Middleton, the inclusion of hardware sprites in particular brought the GX4000 "into the same league as the Atari, Nintendo and Sega 8-bit machines", highlighting Amstrad’s effort to match the technical standards set by its rivals.

The console was designed following Amstrad's "typical" process, where the external casing was finalised before the internal hardware was configured to fit within it. This method had also been used for the CPC 464, where the keyboard, tape deck, and case were fixed before the circuitry was arranged to suit the design. Roland Perry, one of Amstrad’s engineers, noted that the process was similar for the GX4000, with his team completing the console’s distinctive casing before the internals were adapted. Amstrad did not pursue a 16-bit design for the GX4000 due to a lack of expertise and resources. Perry admitted that the company "couldn't produce a ground-up 16-bit console" and that had an easy upgrade path had existed, they would have taken it. As no such option was available, Amstrad instead built upon their familiar 8-bit architecture.

A key design goal during development was to modernise the CPC hardware to bring it closer in capability to contemporary consoles like the Master System and Nintendo Entertainment System. This led to the inclusion of improved video modes, expanded colour palettes, and hardware sprite support—features that had been absent or limited in the original CPC line. Despite these improvements, software compatibility remained a priority; the GX4000 could run games designed specifically for its cartridge format, but many titles were direct ports or slightly enhanced versions of existing CPC software, limiting the system's ability to deliver a distinct or cutting-edge gaming experience.

=== Launch ===
After months of speculation, the GX4000 was officially announced along with the 464 plus and 6128 plus computers at the CNIT Centre in Paris in August 1990. Alan Sugar adopted a pragmatic and understated approach during its press conference. When questioned about the system’s 8-bit architecture in comparison to emerging 16-bit competitors, Sugar dismissed the importance of technical specifications, emphasising instead that the console's success would depend on the overall product and user experience. The system was launched a month later in four countries, Britain, France, Spain, and Italy, priced at £99.99 in Britain and Fr990 in France; software was priced at £25 for most games. The racing game Burnin' Rubber (1990), a power pack, and two controllers were bundled with the machine. It was the first programmable home video game console to be manufactured in the United Kingdom.

Amstrad committed significant resources to the launch of the GX4000, expanding its telemarketing and sales team with the recruitment of new representatives, in preparation for the crucial Christmas period. The console was priced competitively and, unlike its CPC computers, did not require customers to purchase a dedicated monitor, reducing the overall cost of entry. Amstrad also invested £20 million in marketing the system for Europe, with the advertising focussing on a home alternative to playing arcade games. Although the press generally supported the launch, some publications expressed reservations about the console’s prospects. Malcolm Miller, Amstrad's marketing director, felt that the GX4000's "major advantage" in the field would be its low cost, seeing it as the "natural upgrade path" for consumers.

=== Reception ===
Upon its release, the Amstrad GX4000 received some positive initial coverage in the gaming press. At the time, the outlook for the GX4000 appeared promising, with expectations that it could compete effectively in the home console market. It was featured on the cover of Computer and Video Games magazine, where journalist Julian Rignall praised its graphical capabilities, particularly its ability to display up to 32 colours on-screen from a palette of 4,096—a specification he noted was comparable to that of the 16-bit Amiga 500. Rignall described the GX4000 as "graphically superb" and technically superior to both the Nintendo Entertainment System and Master System. He also expressed optimism about the console’s prospects, suggesting that it had "a very exciting line-up of games in the not-too-distant future". Ross Lawton from Amstrad Action thought that GX4000 would "storm" the console market throughout the 1990s, praising its sleek futuristic design for being "right" in the then-new decade. Rik Haynes from ACE likewise praised the console's design and hardware, saying that its "future looks bright" given its technical prowess.

=== Commercial failure ===
The GX4000 was not successful commercially. Sales were disappointing from launch, struggling to compete with established rivals Sega and Nintendo. At the time, the market was shifting towards 16-bit platforms like the Amiga 500 and Atari ST, where software piracy was widespread. Although Amstrad promoted the GX4000’s cartridge format as a secure alternative to floppy disks, the high price point deterred buyers. Software for the system was short in number and slow to arrive, consumer interest remained low, and coverage from popular magazines of the time was slight, with some readers complaining about a lack of information regarding the machine. (Amstrad Action was one of the few magazines to support the console.) Within a few weeks of the initial launch, the system could be bought at discounted prices, and by July 1991 some stores were selling it for as little as £29.99.

Many GX4000 games were CPC titles simply repackaged on cartridge format with minor or no improvements, which led to consumer disinterest, with many users unwilling to pay £25 for a cartridge game they could buy for £3.99 on cassette instead. While some games such as Pro Tennis Tour (1990) by Ubisoft and Tennis Cup 2 (1990) by Loriciels benefited from enhanced graphics when ported to the GX4000, many others failed to take advantage of the console’s expanded capabilities. Most titles were widely regarded as substandard. Compounding these problems was the slow and inconsistent availability of software in retail outlets. By March 1991, reports emerged of a "cartridge crisis", with Amstrad criticised for delays attributed to its control over cartridge manufacturing. In response to poor sales and market dissatisfaction, the price of the GX4000 was reduced to £79.95 in an effort to stimulate demand.

Amstrad lacked the marketing power to compete with the producers of the Mega Drive (released in November 1990 in Europe) and eventually the Super Nintendo Entertainment System. There were also problems with software manufacturing, with companies complaining that the duplication process took months instead of weeks, leading to little software available at launch, and some games being released late or cancelled entirely. When discussing the market failure of the system, the designer, Cliff Lawson, claimed that the GX4000 was technically "at least as good" as the SNES, and that the machine faltered due to a lack of games and Amstrad not having the money to compete with Nintendo and Sega. When asked whether anything could have been done to make the machine a success, he replied that more money would have been required to give software houses more incentive to support Amstrad, and that the games and software needed to be delivered sooner; he also remarked that making the machine 16-bit would have helped.

The GX4000 ultimately sold fewer than 15,000 units, and was quietly discontinued in 1991.

== Hardware ==
=== Technical specifications ===
GX4000 printed circuit board	The GX4000 offered RGB video capability with the SCART connector in back.
GX4000 printed circuit board	Rear profile, with RGB video capability and SCART connector
The connectors on the front of the console.	GX4000 gamepad
The connectors on the front of the console.	GX4000 gamepad

The Amstrad GX4000 is powered by an 8-bit Zilog Z80A CPU running at 4 MHz, accompanied by a custom ASIC that provides hardware support for sprites, smooth scrolling, programmable interrupts, and DMA sound processing. This design allowed the console to offer enhanced graphical and audio features compared to Amstrad's earlier CPC computer range.

The system supports three display modes: Mode 0 allows a resolution of 160×200 pixels with 16 colours, Mode 1 offers 320×200 pixels with 4 colours, and Mode 2 provides 640×200 pixels with 2 colours. The GX4000 features a 12-bit RGB colour depth, offering a palette of 4,096 possible colours, with up to 32 colours displayable on-screen simultaneously—16 allocated for the background, 15 for sprites, and one for the screen border.

For sprite handling, the console is capable of displaying up to 16 high-resolution sprites per line. Each sprite measures 16×16 pixels and can be magnified by factors of two or four in both the horizontal and vertical axes. Each sprite also supports up to 15 true colours from the available palette. Memory on the GX4000 includes 64 KiB of RAM, with 16 KiB of this acting as video RAM, and cartridges can contain up to 512 KiB of ROM. Audio is delivered via a three-channel stereo General Instrument AY-3-8912 chip with support for DMA sound processing. Input and output options include two digital controller ports, an analogue controller port compatible with the IBM standard, a lightgun connector (RJ11), audio and RGB video output via an 8-pin DIN connector, and power supply inputs either from an external power supply unit or directly from a compatible monitor.

=== Peripherals ===
The GX4000 controller is similar to the gamepads of the Master System, Nintendo Entertainment System, and TurboGrafx-16. There are two buttons and a directional controller on the gamepad. A pause button is on the console itself. There is also an IBM-standard analogue controller port on the console's circuit board, but analogue controllers are not widely supported by software.

A light gun can be connected via dedicated RJ11 connector. Multiple third party variants were available; though only two games have light gun support: Skeet Shoot (1990) and The Enforcer (1990). These were both distributed with a third-party gun.

== Game library ==
A total of 27 games were produced and distributed for the GX4000, the majority of which were made by British and French-based companies such as Ocean, Titus, and Loriciels.

Title	Genre(s)	Publisher(s)	Release date(s)	GX4000 version
Barbarian II: The Dungeon of Drax	Action	Ocean	1990	
Batman	Action	Ocean	1990	GX4000 enhanced
Burnin' Rubber	Action	Ocean	1990	GX4000 only
Chase HQ II	Racing	Ocean	1990	Very few copies released
Copter 271	Shooter	Loriciels	1991	GX4000 only
Crazy Cars II	Racing	Titus	1990	GX4000 enhanced
Dick Tracy	Action	Titus	1991	GX4000 enhanced
Epyx World of Sports	Sports	Epyx	1990	GX4000 enhanced
Fire & Forget II	Racing	Titus	1990	GX4000 enhanced
Gazza II	Sports	Empire Interactive	1990	Unreleased
Klax	Puzzle	Domark	1990	GX4000 enhanced
Mystical	Action	Infogrames	1990	
Navy SEALS	Action	Ocean	1990	GX4000 only
No Exit	Fighting	Coktel Vision	1990	GX4000 enhanced
Operation Thunderbolt	Shooter	Ocean	1990	GX4000 enhanced
Pang	Shooter	Ocean	1990	GX4000 enhanced
Panza Kick Boxing	Fighting	Loriciels	1991	GX4000 enhanced
Plotting	Puzzle	Ocean	1990	GX4000 only
Pro Tennis Tour	Sports	Ubi Soft	1990	GX4000 enhanced
RoboCop 2	Shooter	Ocean	1990	GX4000 only
Skeet Shoot	Shooter	Trojan	1990	GX4000 only
Super Pinball Magic	Pinball	Loriciels	1991	GX4000 enhanced
Switchblade	Action	Gremlin Graphics	1990	
Tennis Cup 2	Sports	Loriciels	1990	GX4000 only
The Enforcer	Shooter	Trojan	1990	GX4000 only
Tintin on the Moon	Action	Infogrames	1990	
Wild Streets	Action	Titus	1990	GX4000 enhanced
