= Arabian Nights (2001 video game) =

- Spanish release front cover
- Developer(s): Silmarils
- Publisher(s): PAL: Visiware Wanadoo Edition; NA: The Adventure Company
- Producer(s): Laurant Weill
- Programmer(s): Fabrice Coquillard
- Writer(s): André Rocques
- Composer(s): Dominique Voegelé
- Platform(s): Microsoft Windows
- Release: 2001
- Genre(s): Action-adventure
- Mode(s): Single-player

Arabian Nights is a 3D action-adventure video game published in 2001 for Microsoft Windows in Europe. It was developed by Silmarils and published by Visiware and Wanadoo Edition. It is based on One Thousand and One Nights. It was released digitally on 20 December 2019 by Silmarils on GOG.com.

== Plot ==
Following a wish granted by a Genie, the Sultan of Akabha had quintuplets, named Muscade, Melissa, Hellebore, Spiruline and Guarana.

According to the laws of the Emirate of Akabha, a daughter of the sultan must take a husband before her twentieth birthday, or she will be declared as Al Jotani (Arabic word for "street girl"), and will be taken from the palace and stripped of all her royal rights. On the death of the sultan, power will pass to the eldest son, or if there is no eldest son, to the fiancé of the eldest daughter, failing that to the grand vizier.

The five princesses disappear on the eve of their twentieth birthday. The player controls Ali, a bold and agile young man bestowed with magical powers and different weapons, who must save the princesses in record time, and must also capture their hearts.

Arabian Nights is divided into seven episodes, each one with an introduction and a conclusion. The first episode contains a tutorial.

== Reception ==
Reception

Aggregate score
Aggregator	Score
Metacritic	50/100
