= No Buddies Land =

1991 video game

- Developer: Expose Software
- Publisher: Loriciel
- Platform: Atari ST
- Release: 1991
- Genre: Platform
- Mode: Single-player

No Buddies Land is a 1991 platform game developed by Expose Software and published by Loriciel. The game's developer, Expose Software, included members of the Atari demoscene, and the game featured vertical scrolling and digitized audio, which were technically innovative at the time. Upon release, No Buddies received mixed reviews, with critics praising the visual presentation of the game, but faulting the simple gameplay and high difficulty.

== Gameplay ==

The game is a platformer where players are Bud, who must climb a tower into the clouds to reverse a curse, leading the land to be flooded. The objective of the game is to vertically ascend six levels to the top, avoiding traps, enemies, and a slowly rising water level that requires the player to keep moving.

== Reception ==
Reception

Review scores
Publication	Score
Joystick	61%
Amiga Joker	48%
Play Time	51%
Power Play	57%
Tilt	C

Oliver Baumgärtel of Play Time found the graphics and animations to be above average, but considered the game's narrative to be "unimaginative", stating that the game was unexciting and had "excessive difficulty" due to a lack of a password system. Stating the game had "little that we haven't already seen", Richard Lowenstein of Amiga Joker said that the game was "more frustrating and fun" due to its "tricky platforms" and limited lives. Diego de Mauve of Tilt considered the game's technical execution to be "cutting-edge", but the game's appeal to be limited due to the difficulty. Dismissing the game as "no-name mediocrity" in all aspects, Power Play stated the game's "simple platforming" no longer appealed to players. Retro Gamer retrospectively described the game, stating it was a "solid example of [a] vertical platformer", but "the graphics aren't a whole lot to speak of and the difficulty is rather unforgiving".
