= André Panza =

French kickboxer

André Panza (born 1959 in Strasbourg), nicknamed Doctor KO, is a French martial artist, coach, and businessman. He is a nine-time world champion across three disciplines: six times in Kickboxing, twice in Savate, and once in full contact. He has also competed in professional Boxing and Muay Thai and holds a 4th-dan black belt in Judo. In kickboxing, savate, and full-contact competition, Panza had 114 fights, with 109 victories—87 by knockout—and 5 defeats.

== Early life ==
Panza was born in 1959 in Strasbourg. He has Italian ancestry on his father's side. His family is heavily involved in martial arts: his father holds 6th dan in judo and 6th dan in aikido; his mother holds 4th dan in judo and 5th dan in aikido; and his sister Marie-Paul was vice-world champion in judo and holds 5th dan.

== Competitive career ==
Panza won nine world championships in three disciplines: six in kickboxing, two in French boxing, and one in full contact. His record in those disciplines is 114 fights, 109 victories, 87 knockouts, and 5 defeats. Panza fought several notable fights in his career. In his first world kickboxing title he knocked down Pascal Leplat several times and won by first-round knockout. In 1984 Andre fought Dominique Hervois Dakhlaoui in Savate in the European Cup and won by decision.

In 1989 Panza fought Spanish fighter José Vicente Eguzkiza in Savate in the finals at the World Cup and lost by decision. In that same year Panza fought Ronnie Deleon. Panza defeated the American challenger, via a referee stoppage (TKO) in the 5th round. Panza, successfully defended and retained his WKA World Super Welterweight title.

In 1991 the Professional Kickboxing Organization had Panza as the number 10 ranked Light Middleweight in the world. In 1992 Panza fought Krongsak Sakkasem at the 7th Festival des Arts Martiaux in Paris, France. Panza lost by TKO from punches in round 9.

== Professional boxing record ==
Panza was a professional boxer in the super welterweight division. He was active from 1986 to 1994, with a record of 4 bouts: 3 wins (2 by knockout) and 1 loss. His professional debut was on 29 November 1986.

== Coaching career ==
Panza began teaching at about age 16, when he obtained his first coaching qualifications in French boxing and judo. After retiring from competition he continued to train both professional and amateur fighters at Panza Gym. Panza is also the manager of his own combat-sports equipment company and head of the Panza-Gymnothèque, a multi-discipline combat-sport and fitness club. His teaching covers recreational sport, self-defense, and competition.

== Lutte-contact ==
Panza has promoted lutte-contact, which he describes as a logical union of strikers and grapplers, with ethics and rules to keep it a sport accessible to all. Technically, he says, lutte-contact uses standing Muay Thai techniques and judo and sambo techniques on the ground; strikes on the ground are not allowed, which requires a high level of ground technique.

== Personal life ==
Panza is married to Yvette Palatino, a French savate fighter and kickboxing world champion who is also involved in coaching at the Panza Gym.

Panza has a son, Jean-Brice, who was a French junior champion in kickboxing and Thai boxing, and a daughter, Angélina, who has been French champion in English boxing and Thai boxing.

== Video Game ==
A video game named after Panza, Panza Kick Boxing, was released in 1990. Panza has said it was the first game devoted to kickboxing.
