= L'Aigle d'Or =

1984 video game

L'Aigle d'or
- Developer: Loriciels
- Programmer: Louis-Marie Rocques
- Platforms: Amstrad CPC, Oric, Thomson MO, Thomson TO
- Release: March 1984
- Genre: Action

L'Aigle d'Or is a 1984 French action video game by Loriciels.

== Development ==
The game had an initial investment of approximately 100,000 FF and took three months of work.

== Release ==
Games & Strategy suggested that in the Loriciels catalog, the game was "only (and wrongly)" cited as a role-playing game. Microphone anticipated the game's release on MO5 to be successful due to the recent success of its Oric release. The game peaked at 30,000 copies sold.

== Critical reception ==
Tilt wrote the game is: "the precursor of a new range of adventure software, which will be more and more realistic, more and more “real”. An undeniable success." Micro 7 gave it a rating of 5 out of 5 stars.

== Legacy ==
The game has been described as reminiscent of the Thomson MO5 video game Thesaurus and the Oric (acquired by Atmos) title Le secret du tombeau. Tilt noted that publishers were using "drastic measures to extract the quintessence of the Thomson TO7/70", citing L'Aigle d'Or, Thesarus, and Mandragore in the adventure and role-playing genres.

It had a sequel in 1992 called L'Aigle d'or, le retour.

== See also ==
- Le Mystère de Kikekankoi, Loriciels' follow-up game in 1985.
