= Fiendish Freddy's Big Top o' Fun =

1990 video game

- Developer: Gray Matter
- Publisher: Mindscape
- Designer: Chris Gray
- Platforms: Commodore 64, ZX Spectrum, Amstrad CPC, Commodore Amiga, Atari ST, IBM PC
- Release: 1990
- Genre: Comedy sports
- Modes: Single-player, multiplayer

Fiendish Freddy's Big Top o' Fun is a video game developed by Gray Matter under developer Chris Gray and published in 1990 by Mindscape. It originally appeared on the 16-bit Atari ST, IBM PC and Commodore Amiga, before later being converted to the ZX Spectrum, Commodore 64, Amstrad CPC. The Commodore 64 version was included on cartridge bundled with the Commodore 64 Games System.

== Plot ==
A greedy banker by the name of I.M. Tightwad, whom the Big Top o' Fun circus owes $10,000, arrives on the scene with the intent of demolishing the circus tonight unless it can pay up. He plans to build a luxury hotel complex on the terrain. In a fit of desperation, the ringmaster organises a display of six acts to raise money for the doomed circus: diving, juggling, trapeze, knife throwing, tightrope and the human cannonball. The performance in each act is judged by five clown judges, who offer money depending on the quality of the show. Mr. Tightwad, however, doesn't want the circus to successfully pay up its due, so he sends his evil clown lackey, Fiendish Freddy, to sabotage the acts.

== Premise ==
The game is similar to many of the multi-event sports games of the time such as Epyx' California Games, Winter Games and Summer Games. However, Fiendish Freddy differs not only by its surroundings (circus acts) offering a comedy element, but it also offers a plot and a clear goal of earning $10,000. Each player can choose to be represented by one of the circus animals, namely, a lion, a bear, a tiger, a monkey, and an elephant. The six acts are:

=== Diving ===
The player assumes the role of a diver and is challenged to jump off four diving boards of increasing height into containers of water of decreasing size, beginning with a huge wooden container, then a bucket, a wet sponge, and finally a glass of water. A set series of stunts must also be performed throughout the jump in order to get more money. Freddy will attempt to hinder the player by blowing the diver off course with an enormous hair dryer if he fails to perform the stunt in time.

=== Juggling ===
The player assumes the role of a unicycle-riding clown and has to complete four juggling sessions of increasing difficulty. Each level brings more items to juggle, but not just regular ones – sometimes, babies get lost in the mass and must be thrown back into their prams. Of course, Freddy will try to throw a surprise or two into the mix, in the form of bombs, which can be thrown back at Freddy to make them explode in his face, or missiles that must be juggled as per other objects. If even a single bomb or missile ever hits the ground, the resulting explosion will kill the juggler.

The juggler is allowed five mistakes (marked by dots changing from green to red) before the challenge is failed. Missing five times without dying from a bomb or missile causes an off-stage performer to use a cane on the juggler and yank him.

=== Trapeze ===
The player assumes the role of a trapeze jumper and is challenged to proceed from right to left over three levels, jumping from one rope to another. Along the way, there are rings of fire and moving targets that have to be jumped through. Freddy, as usual, will try to ruin the act, this time showing up on a jetpack with a pair of large scissors to cut the trapeze rope if the player takes too long to time the jump, causing the jumper to fall.

Sights on the ground, ranging from a marching band and organ to a trainer with his elephant, are also present as a possible distraction, although it can also be argued that the former are providing the music for the act.

=== Knife Throwing ===
The player assumes the role of a knife thrower and must throw knives at balloons on a rotating wheel with a female assistant strapped to it. The assistant is not a target and will scream if hit, also causing the screen to be covered in blood. There are a limited number of knives available. If the player fails to burst all of the balloons by running out of either time or knives, the performance is failed as Freddy can be seen unscrewing the wheel. Freddy will also try to make it harder once in a while by throwing smoke bombs in to hinder the player's vision.

=== Tightrope ===
The player assumes the role of a tightrope walker and must walk across the tightrope while carrying a pole to keep balance, across three levels. Freddy will intervene occasionally, whether flying on his jetpack in an attempt to knock the walker off the rope, or by throwing saw blades at the walker to slice him in half. The blades can be deflected with the pole. If the walker falls off by losing balance, Freddy will pick a finger off the walker's grip on the rope, causing him to fall.

=== Human Cannonball ===
The player assumes the role of a cannonball man in the final act, where he will be launched from a cannon into a target trampoline. The cannonball man's female assistant will put a predetermined amount of gunpowder into the cannon, and the player has to move the target to determine the distance, then set the angle of the cannon so that the cannonball man will land on the target. Freddy plays a smaller role in this act; he only gets involved if the player takes too long to decide where to land, upon which he destroys the cannon by jamming it with a cork.

=== Endings ===
There are two endings to the game, depending on whether or not the player manages to collect enough money to save the circus:

- If the player fails, the circus is demolished, and a building labeled Freddy's Towers is erected in its place. Fiendish Freddy himself appears afterwards, grinning towards the player and carrying a sign with "The End" on it.
- If the player succeeds, the ringmaster and the performers decide to get even with Fiendish Freddy by launching a portly diva toward him with a seesaw. A panicked Freddy attempts to flee, only to get crushed by the fat lady. In the subsequent scene, the Big Top o' Fun circus gets expanded, and a blimp can be seen flying through, carrying a banner with "The End" on it.

== Graphic violence ==
The game's black humor was principally very dark and the violence was surprisingly graphic for a title of this period – the tightrope walker gets sliced in two through the midriff when hit by a blade, and the juggler is blown to pieces when hit by a bomb, for example. The lack of any kind of media panic in retrospect might seem surprising, although such public outrage only became common from about 1992 onwards, following the releases of Wolfenstein 3D and Mortal Kombat, which contained CGI blood and gore.

== Critical reaction ==
Reception

Awards
Publication	Award
Crash	Crash Smash
Sinclair User	SU Classic

=== ZX Spectrum ===
Your Sinclair awarded the game 80%, but reviewer David Wilson clearly stated that this was for the disk version – the tape version suffered from an extremely unwieldy multi-load system. CRASH awarded it 90%.

=== Amiga ===
German Amiga magazine Amiga Joker awarded the game 81%, CU Amiga 80%, Zzap! 91%.

=== Commodore 64 ===
Zzap! magazine awarded the game 89%, while Power Play gave a rating of 66%.
