= Tommy Moe's Winter Extreme: Skiing and Snowboarding =

1994 video game

- North American cover art
- Developer: Loriciel
- Publishers: FRA/DE: Loriciel; NA: Electro Brain; UK: Mindscape; JP: Pack-In-Video
- Producer: Laurant Weill
- Programmers: Olivier Richez; Vincent Baillet
- Artist: Philippe Tesson
- Composer: Michel Winogradoff
- Platform: Super Nintendo Entertainment System
- Release: FRA: February 1994; NA: June 1994; DE/UK: September 1994; JP: November 25, 1994
- Genre: Sports
- Modes: Single-player, multiplayer

Tommy Moe's Winter Extreme: Skiing and Snowboarding, (Note: Known in Japan as Ski Paradise with Snowboard (Japanese: スキーパラダイス WITH スノーボード)) known in Europe as Val d'Isère Championship, is a winter sports video game for the Super Nintendo Entertainment System that uses skiing and snowboarding as extreme sports in freestyle mode, training mode, or competition mode.

== Gameplay ==
Good timing allows players to jump high into the air.

Competition mode gives players three chances to successfully complete the challenges. Otherwise, players get the "game over" screen advising them to try again. The freestyle mode plays like a video arcade racing game, the training mode allows players to use any course, and the competition mode is like the Winter Olympic Games. Controls can be modified and players can either use skis or snowboards. The game is named after US alpine skier Tommy Moe and is co-endorsed with Val-d'Isère, which hosted the men's downhill skiing event during the 1992 Winter Olympics in Albertville, France. The Japanese version of the game also features as endorsement from Italian ski equipment company Nordica, evident on the game's box.

Conditions can change on the course, including dawn, dusk, darkness, and afternoon conditions, and even forcing players to navigate through a winter storm. Once players reach the bottom of the hill in freestyle mode, they must use the ski lift in order to climb to the top of the next mountain. There are less than 70 seconds to get to the next checkpoint. The fastest speed that snowboards can go is 66 miles per hour (106.2 kilometres per hour) on hilly terrain and 88 miles per hour (141.6 kilometres per hour) on flat terrain.

A password allows players to continue their saved progress as they explore new regions of the mountain and refine their skiing or snowboarding skills.

== Development and release ==
The game was released in France in February 1994 and in the United States that same June. the United Kingdom, Germany, and Japan releases followed later that year.

== Reception ==
Reception

Review scores
Publication	Score
Computer and Video Games	58%
Electronic Gaming Monthly	8/10, 7/10, 7/10, 7/10, 7/10
Game Players	77%
Official Nintendo Magazine	56/100
Total!	5
Electronic Games	B+
Entertainment Weekly	B
Games World	57/100
Super Gamer	77/100

Award
Publication	Award
GameFan (1994)	Best Simulation (SNES)

Tommy Moe's Winter Extreme: Skiing & Snowboarding received an average reception from critics. GameFan awarded it "Best Simulation Game" on the SNES in their third Megawards edition.
