= Mach 3 (1987 video game) =

- Developer: Loriciels
- Publisher: Loriciels
- Designers: Vincent Baillet; Bruno Masson
- Composer: Michel Winogradoff
- Platforms: Amiga, Amstrad CPC, Atari ST, MSX, Thomson, ZX Spectrum, MS-DOS
- Release: 1987: Amstrad, ST, MS-DOS, Thomson; 1988: Amiga; 1989: MSX, Spectrum
- Genre: Shoot 'em up
- Mode: Single-player

Mach 3 is a 3D shoot 'em up video game released by Loriciels in 1987 for Amstrad CPC, Atari ST, Thomson MO6 and TO8, and MS-DOS. An Amiga port was published in 1988 and versions for the ZX Spectrum and MSX in 1989.

== Gameplay ==
The player controls a spacecraft and shoots various enemy crafts while avoiding mines and obstacles. During the intro screen, a sampled is phrase is spoken: "Get ready for Mach 3."
