= Flimbo's Quest =

1990 video game

- Developer: System 3
- Publisher: System 3
- Designers: Roger Schuttelaar, Laurens van der Donk
- Artist: Arthur van Jole
- Composers: Johannes Bjerregaard [C64] Reyn Ouwehand [C64 loader music] Charles Deenen [Amiga port] Steve Wetherill [Atari ST port]
- Platforms: Amiga, Amstrad CPC, Atari ST, Commodore 64
- Release: NA: 1990
- Genre: Platform game
- Mode: Single-player

Flimbo's Quest is a 2D platform game published by British publishing house System 3 (later renamed to Studio 3 Interactive) for the Commodore 64, Amiga, Atari ST and Amstrad CPC. A ZX Spectrum version was produced, but never released. The game itself was developed by Laurens van der Donk in the Netherlands who was involved in the demoscene being in both Boys Without Brains (BWB) and Hotline.

The music was put together by developers Maniacs of Noise. The original C64 music was composed by Johannes Bjerregaard with the exception of the loading music which was composed by Reyn Ouwehand (who later released a remix of that song). Charles Deenen arranged the Amiga version's music which follows Bjerregaard's original.

== Overview ==
The mad scientist Fransz Dandruff has created a machine that draws the life energy from its victim for himself, thus extending his life indefinitely. Dandruff kidnaps Pearly, beauty queen of Dewdropland, to provide this energy. Her boyfriend Flimbo sets out to save her.

The player controls Flimbo through seven distinct levels, collecting scrolls for the wizard Dazz Bazian, to allow him to create a spell that will send Flimbo to the next level. The levels are free-roaming, and some exploration is necessary to find the scrolls from enemies scattered around the area, as well as other secrets such as banks and various power-ups. These power-ups include a super weapon, which extends the range and strength of Flimbo's shooting, invulnerability, which lasts for 30 seconds—this does not protect from water or holes—and in level 6, hourglasses, which add two minutes to the time limit. All of these can be purchased in Dazz's shops, along with individual letters or complete words of the code. Hearts can also be obtained in five colours to give the player an extra life.

Flimbo's Quest takes place over seven levels: a normal rural landscape, a fishing village, a mountain landscape, a weird alien world, a forest, a graveyard and Fransz Dandruff's laboratory. There are also two different songs which alternate between levels.

Although there are only a few different enemy types in each level, there is a further distinction to be made by the player, in terms of location on the level. In level 5 for example, the player may be required to kill an antelope, but it is not possible to tell from the mugshot alone where in the level it is (an enemy carrying a scroll will flash in the 8-bit versions, or have an arrow on top of it in the Amiga and Atari ST versions). There is also a maximum amount of money which can be obtained in each level, assuming that the player manages to kill enough enemies, though it is inadvisable because of the stringent time limit.

Each level provides two or three secret power-ups, which can be activated by simultaneously firing and ducking in the correct places. These power-ups can be used to quickly finish the level. Among the power-ups available are superscrolls, item upgrade (free heart/heart to scroll/scroll to superscroll), two minutes extra time, and a "smart bomb" which will destroy all enemies on and just outside the boundaries of the screen.

At the end of level seven, the letters that Flimbo has collected are revealed to be assembly language instructions, and are programmed into Dandruff's computer to free Pearly. When the game is completed, it restarts from the beginning with the time count, money, lives, hearts (if any) and score that the player had.

== Reaction ==
Reception

Award
Publication	Award
C+VG	Hit

The video gaming press gave Flimbo's Quest a mediocre reception as standard and unoriginal platform fare. However, the C64 version achieved a high level of distribution due to the game being distributed on a cartridge with four games. It was distributed in the early 1990s with the Commodore 64. The cartridge was also distributed with the ill-fated Commodore 64 Games System console (also known as the C64GS).

== Notes ==
Due to the "cartoony" font of the title "Flimbo's Quest" that was written on the game disk, and the hard-to-read brown-on-blue colours, it was often misread as "Fumbo's Quest" with the L and I merging into a U. Some software retailers even marketed the game with this name.
