= Best of the Best: Championship Karate =

1992 video game

- Developers: Futura; Loriciel (Game Boy, Genesis, NES)
- Publishers: EU: Loriciel; NA: Electro Brain
- Designer: Pascal Jarry
- Programmer: Pascal Jarry
- Artists: Marco De Flores; Christophe Perrotin; Isabelle Maury
- Composer: Michel Winogradoff
- Platforms: Amiga, Amstrad CPC, MS-DOS, NES, Super NES, Game Boy, Mega Drive/Genesis
- Release: 1992; 1993 (SNES, Genesis)
- Genre: Fighting
- Modes: Single-player, multiplayer

Best of the Best: Championship Karate (Note: Known in Japan as The Kick Boxing for the TurboGrafx-CD, Mega Drive and Game Boy and as Super Kick Boxing for the Super Famicom) is a 1992 kick boxing game that features black belt kick boxing masters. The object is to win the kick boxing championship by defeating an array of kick boxing masters in a series of fighting matches. The Sega Genesis version is one of the few games to offer support for the Sega Activator motion controller.

Best of the Best is an updated version of Panza Kick Boxing which was released in 1990 in Europe for various computers as well as the TurboGrafx-16.

Martial artist/actor Ron Yuan stated in a 1994 interview that "I know a lot of pure gamers will disagree, but the best SNES fighting game from a purely technical martial arts point of view is Best of the Best. It didn't get much notoriety, but my friends and I know martial arts, and they go nuts whenever we play."

== Reception ==
Juris Graney of The Australian Commodore & Amiga Review compared Best of the Best to its predecessor: "Best of the Best Championship Karate is almost a reproduction of my old favourite, Panza Kick Boxing. In fact, it's the sequel, subtitled Panza Gold Edition. Everything is the same – the crowd, the referee, the moves and everything else. The only difference is an advanced stage at the end."
