= Infernal Runner =

1985 video game

- Developer: Loriciel
- Publisher: Loriciel
- Designer: Michel Koell
- Platforms: Commodore 64, Amstrad CPC
- Release: 1985
- Genre: Platform
- Mode: Single-player

Infernal Runner is a French satirical horror-themed platform game for the Commodore 64 published by Loriciel in 1985. Originally designed by Michel Koell and Yves Korta, the satirical tone has been compared to Jet Set Willy and Takeshi's Challenge. Éric Chahi, who later created Another World, is credited with porting the game to the Amstrad CPC. It has been described as one of the first survival horror games.

== Gameplay ==
Players find themselves trapped in a house with lethal traps and various other menaces, and they must escape alive by collecting all keys and opening all trunks, all while avoiding starvation by collecting food. It is unknown what the actual story is: after collecting enough items, a wall on the map will disappear and the player can escape the game, upon which the character is run over by an ambulance car and is carried offscreen on a stretcher.
