= Plotting (video game) =

1989 video game

- North American arcade flyer
- Developer: Taito
- Publisher: Taito
- Platforms: Arcade, Atari ST, Amiga, Commodore 64, Amstrad CPC, GX4000, ZX Spectrum, Famicom, Game Boy
- Release: Arcade: JP: June 1989; NA: August 1989; Famicom: JP: December 15th, 1989; Game Boy: JP: March 16th, 1990; NA: April 1990; Amiga, C64, GX400, ST, Spectrum: EU: 1990
- Genre: Puzzle
- Modes: Single-player, multiplayer

Plotting, released as Flipull (Note: Japanese: フリップル, Hepburn: Furippuru) in Japan, is a 1989 tile-matching puzzle video game developed and published by Taito for arcades. It was released in Japan in June 1989 and North America in August 1989. It was ported to the Famicom and Game Boy. As Plotting it was ported to the Atari ST, Amiga, Commodore 64, Amstrad CPC, GX4000, and ZX Spectrum. The game bears strong graphical and some gameplay similarities to Puzznic.

== Gameplay ==
Arcade screenshot

== Reception ==
Reception

Review score
Publication	Score
Electronic Gaming Monthly	7/10, 8/10, 6/10, 7/10 (GB)

In Japan, Game Machine listed Plotting on their August 1, 1989 issue as being the eighth most-successful table arcade unit of the month. The game was ranked the 23rd best game of all time by Amiga Power.

== Legacy ==
In 2005, Plotting was re-released for Xbox, PlayStation 2, and Microsoft Windows as part of Taito Legends. Hamster Corporation released the game as part of the Arcade Archives series for the Nintendo Switch and PlayStation 4 in May 2022.
