= World Tour Racing =

1997 video game

- Developer: Teque London
- Publisher: Telegames
- Programmer: Lee Briggs
- Composer: Stephen Morgan
- Platform: Atari Jaguar CD
- Release: NA: June 4, 1997; EU: June 1997
- Genre: Racing
- Modes: Single-player, multiplayer

World Tour Racing is a 1997 racing video game developed by Teque London and published by Telegames for the Atari Jaguar CD. In the game, the player controls a Formula One car competing against computer-controlled opponents in races across multiple locations. Gameplay consists of three modes and the player can customize the vehicle's characteristics.

World Tour Racing was programmed by Lee Briggs, who worked on several Zeppelin Games releases. The team aimed to replicate Virtua Racing for the Jaguar, but the polygonal look became outdated as it progressed and were pressured to include texture mapping. The music was scored by Stephen Morgan, who also composed Val d'Isère Skiing and Snowboarding. In 1996, Atari merged with JTS and ceased production of the Jaguar, resulting in the game not being released despite being finished. Telegames became involved after sub-licensing it from Atari and Briggs helped resolve technical issues so the game could be published. A PC version was planned but never released.

World Tour Racing received average reception from critics and retrospective commentators; the music, multiplayer, and AI were praised, but others expressed mixed opinions regarding the controls, while some criticized the visuals, frame rate, and lack of Memory Track support.

== Gameplay ==
Gameplay screenshot showcasing the United States track

World Tour Racing is a three-dimensional Formula One racing game, similar to Checkered Flag (1994) on the Atari Jaguar, where the main goal is to finish a race ahead of other racers controlled by the computer. During gameplay, the player can alternate between multiple camera views. The player can choose or adjust various gameplay options before starting a race, such as lap count, gear transmission, button mapping, and difficulty. Excessive crashes and tire wear will impair the vehicle's handling and performance on the track, forcing players to pit and repair damaged components.

There are three different modes of play to choose from at the menu screen: Single Race, Championship and Arcade. Single Race is a race mode where players compete against computer-controlled opponents on any track and complete a number of laps. Championship is a season mode where players compete against ten opponents to qualify and advance across sixteen tracks. Arcade mode is similar to Championship mode, except that players accumulate points and must finish in a high position for the next round. In both Championship and Arcade modes, players can access a workshop where they can customize the vehicle's tires, airfoil setting, gearbox and brakes.

The game is compatible with the ProController, but does not support the Memory Track cartridge for saving; however, a password is provided to players to resume progress. Additionally, the game has a split screen multiplayer option for Single Race and Arcade modes.

== Development and release ==
World Tour Racing was developed over the course of two years by Teque London, which previously worked on Brutal Sports Football. It was programmed by Lee Briggs, who worked on several Zeppelin Games releases as well as F1-Racer for the Amiga. The game was initially conceived as "Virtua Racing on the Atari Jaguar", but the polygonal look became outdated as it progressed and the team was pressured to include texture mapping. Sprite-scaling and bitmaps tricks were used with the Jaguar's GPU for extra landscape detail, while the game runs at a variable display resolution due to a technique used by Briggs to maintain the frame rate. Twelve of the game's sixteen tracks were based on real F1 circuits, while the rest were fictional ones created by the staff. Originally, only six cars appeared in each race but this was increased to ten during the tuning process, while the AI was built on another platform before the project began but was tested and refined over time. The music was scored by Stephen Morgan, who also composed Val d'Isère Skiing and Snowboarding.

The game was first shown at the 1995 Winter Consumer Electronics Show, announced for release in February 1995 under the name Teque's F1. It made another appearance at the 1995 ECTS Spring event as Formula One, but was delayed until October 1995 and renamed F1 Racer. It was also shown at Atari Corporation during "Fun 'n' Games Day", an event to showcase upcoming Jaguar titles to journalists. In 1996, Atari merged with JTS Corporation, ceasing production of the Jaguar and games that were in development for it. This resulted in the game not being published despite being finished, but Atari agreed to continue supporting the Jaguar as part of the merger.

Telegames became involved after sub-licensing it from Atari and Briggs helped resolve technical issues so the game could be published. By this time, Telegames was one of the last remaining third-party publishers for the Jaguar and Briggs thanked them for releasing it to the public. The game was released under its final title, World Tour Racing, in North America on June 4, 1997, followed by a European release the same month. Being a late release for the Atari Jaguar CD, it was only available through direct order from Telegames and Electronics Boutique. In France, the game was distributed by La Terre du Milieu. A PC version was planned but never released.

== Reception ==
Reception

Review scores
Publication	Score
Atari Gaming Headquarters	4/10
The Atari Times	85%
Jaguar Explorer Online	3/5
ST-Computer	70%

World Tour Racing received average reviews. Jaguar Explorer Online's Clay Halliwell commended the full-motion video cutscenes, upbeat music, controls, and multiplayer, but he found the game barely better than Checkered Flag (1994), criticizing its dismal visuals, low frame rate, unhelpful computer steering assistance, limited sound effects and lack of Memory Track support. The Atari Times appreciated the graphics and AI, but felt the choppy frame rate affected the gameplay and disapproved of the limited musical variety. ST Magazine's Pascal Berrocal highlighted its numerous options, cinematics, soundscapes, and gameplay, but faulted the drab visuals and jerky frame rate.

ST-Computer's Helge Bollinger considered it better than Checkered Flag and Club Drive, giving favorable remarks about its controls, AI, music and multiplayer, but found the graphics inferior to those of PlayStation titles and sound effects poor. He also criticized the lack of Memory Track support. Atari Gaming Headquarters' Keita Iida noted its replay value and vehicle customization but panned the abrupt controls, poor frame rate, and rampant slowdown. Brett Daly of Jaguar Front Page News (a part of the GameSpy network) praised its audiovisual presentation and gameplay but noted the inconsistent frame rate. Author Andy Slaven regarded it as a mediocre racing game due to the choppy frame rate and poor controls. neXGam said that "World Tour Racing is once again a prime example of the suffering of many Jaguar games. A lot of potential, with many good approaches, but which were destroyed through many smaller and larger mistakes".
