= Bumpy (video game) =

1989 video game

- Developer: Loriciels
- Platforms: ZX Spectrum, Amstrad CPC, Atari ST, MS-DOS
- Release: 1989
- Genre: Platform
- Mode: Single-player

Bumpy is a 1989 platform game created by Loriciels. It was published for ZX Spectrum, Amstrad CPC, MSX, Atari ST, and MS-DOS.

== Gameplay ==
The player controls a ball, collecting items to open the exit. While most platforms are perfectly harmless, some have additional qualities, such as being destructible, thereby granting access to other parts of the screen. Some platforms are on fire, which will turn out lethal unless the player has picked up a water droplet in advance.

== Legacy ==
A remake of the game was created in 1992 with the name Bumpy's Arcade Fantasy.

Loriciels wanted a 16-bit game so they handed it over to Infogrames who made Pop-up in 1991. The loading screen and graphics changed but the music sound effects and gameplay remained the same. The Game Boy version of Pop-up was renamed Cool Ball in the United States.
