= Downhill Challenge =

1988 video game

- US MS-DOS cover
- Developer: Microids
- Publishers: Loriciel (FR); Broderbund (US)
- Platforms: Amstrad CPC, Atari ST, Amiga, Apple IIGS, MS-DOS, Commodore 64, ZX Spectrum
- Release: 1988
- Genre: Sports
- Mode: Single-player

Screenshot

Downhill Challenge is a skiing video game developed by Microïds. It was published 1988 in the US by Broderbund and in France by Loriciel as Super Ski. In the UK it had an Eddie the Eagle license. The third-person, 2.5D game has 4 modes: Downhill, Slalom, Giant Slalom and Ski Jump. It can be played up to 5 players taking turns with their results compared at the end.

== See also ==
- List of Microids games
