= Super Skweek =

1991 video game

- Developer: Loriciel
- Publisher: Loriciel
- Designers: Laurent Arditi; Stephane Ducasse
- Platforms: Amiga, Atari ST, Lynx, MS-DOS, Amstrad CPC, Game Gear, PC Engine, iOS
- Release: 1991
- Genre: Puzzle
- Modes: Single-player, multiplayer

Super Skweek is a puzzle video game developed and published by Loriciel. The game was released on multiple platforms in the early 1990s as a follow-up to 1989's Skweek (released as Slider in 1991 in the United States). Atari Corporation released the Lynx version in North America.

== Gameplay ==
Super Skweek

The player plays the Super Skweek, an orange-furred creature of unknown origin. Under the command of the King, the player has to move over blue tiles in order to repaint them pink, fighting off the monster invasion in doing so. There are five islands, each consisting of 50 levels.

Some levels contain various monsters roaming around, and certain special tiles such as slippery tiles, explosive tiles, floating tiles and tiles which move the player in a certain direction. There are also coins to collect in order to buy prizes at the shop such as bombs or other improved powers.

== Reception ==
For the Atari Lynx version of the game French magazine, Consoles Plus gave a score of 97%. On atariarchives.org Robert Jung gave the game a score of 7.5 out of 10. For the Amiga version Amiga Action gave Super Skweek 82%.

== Legacy ==
Super Skweek was rereleased in 2013 for iOS.
