= Reversi Champion =

1984 video game adaptation of the board game Othello

- Publisher: Loriciels
- Directors: Vincent Baillet (Oric, SC-3000); Jacques Métois (CPC)
- Writer: Loriciels
- Platforms: Oric 1, Oric Atmos, Sega SC-3000, Amstrad CPC
- Release: 1984
- Genres: Board game, abstract strategy game, Othello
- Modes: Single-player, multiplayer

Reversi Champion is a video game adaptation of the Othello board game. Playable in single-player or two-player modes, it was developed and published by Loriciels and released in 1984 for the Oric 1, Oric Atmos, and Sega SC-3000 computers. An Amstrad CPC version followed in February 1986.

While the Oric and SC-3000 versions offer relatively basic gameplay, the Amstrad CPC edition stands out for its extensive options and refined controls for placing pieces. All versions are notable for their range of difficulty levels.

Vincent Baillet, the original developer, created the game while still a high school student. He programmed early versions for programmable calculators and the ZX81, which competed in international Othello programming tournaments. Baillet later adapted the game for the Oric 1 at Loriciels' request, with the SC-3000 version released concurrently in 1984. A planned Rainbow 100 version was ultimately canceled. In 1986, Jacques Métois developed a distinct Amstrad CPC adaptation.

Contemporary reviews praised the game's accessibility and polish, though some criticized the Amstrad CPC version's algorithm as suitable only for beginners. Other critiques noted a lack of originality, but overall, Reversi Champion received positive feedback.

== Gameplay ==
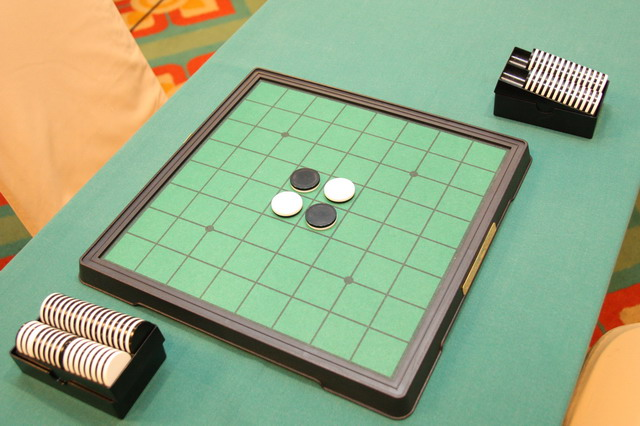
An Othello game board at the start of a match.

Reversi Champion is a digital adaptation of the Othello board game. Two players compete on a game board of 64 squares, one using white pieces and the other black. The objective is to have the most pieces of one's color on the board by the end of the game. Players take turns placing a piece of their color, capturing opponent pieces by flanking them in a row, column, or diagonal, thereby flipping them to their color.

The game supports single-player mode against the computer or two-player mode, with a demonstration mode featuring computer-versus-computer play also available.

Game screen representations

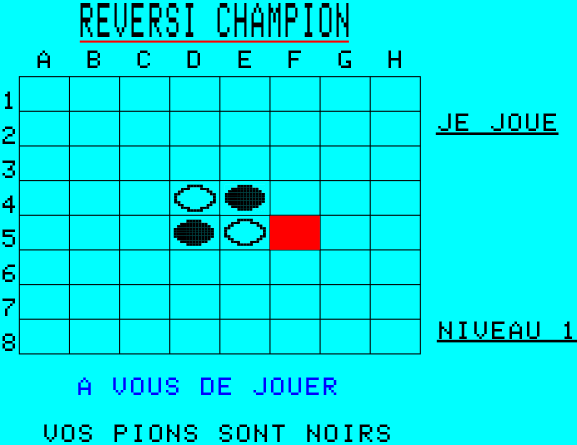
Oric version

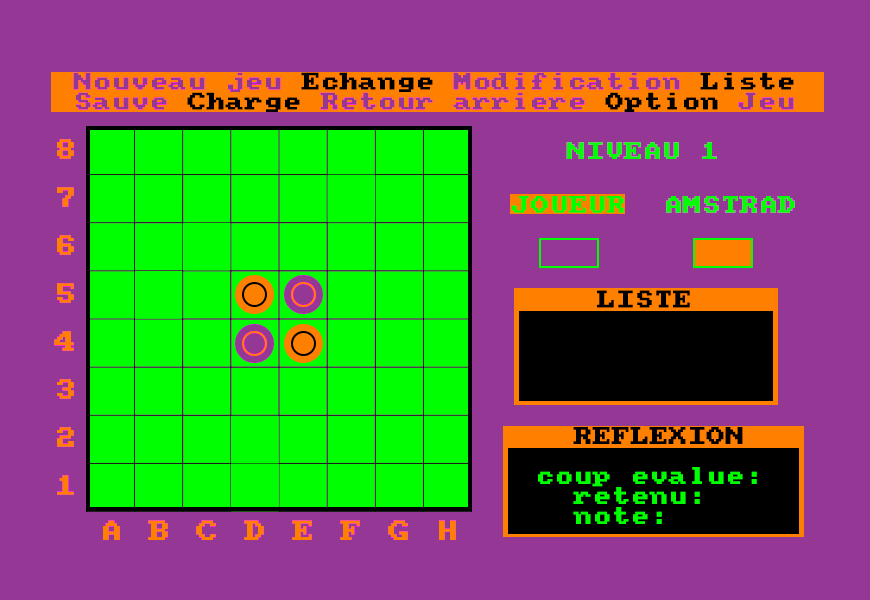
Amstrad CPC version

On Oric 1 and Oric Atmos, the game board dominates the screen, displayed in black against a light blue background. To the right, information such as whose turn it is, the difficulty level, and occasional computer hints are shown. On the Amstrad CPC, the board occupies the left half, rendered in green against a purple background with orange and purple pieces. Players can customize these colors. The top of the screen features an options menu, while the right side displays the difficulty level, a log of recent moves, a field for entering the next move, and a panel evaluating the computer's possible moves.

In the Oric version, players select a square using the keyboard from a list of available moves displayed by the computer. On the CPC, players move a cursor, depicted as an arrow, across the board using a joystick, arrow keys, or an AMX mouse. Alternatively, players can input square coordinates via the keyboard. A list of possible moves is also accessible.

The Oric version offers fifteen difficulty levels plus "Beginner" or "Expert" modes, with the computer's thinking time varying by level. Players can undo moves, request hints, change levels mid-game, or interrupt the computer's move calculation. The CPC version provides six difficulty levels, with thinking time also scaling with difficulty. It includes 4,000 possible opening moves and ten options, such as undoing moves, swapping player pieces mid-game, editing the board, or saving a game for later. These options open windows for user interaction.

== Development ==
=== Early versions and international Othello tournaments ===
In the early 1980s, Vincent Baillet, the future programmer of the Oric and Sega SC-3000 versions, was an avid Othello player. Inspired by the interactive Reversi Challenger board, which performed impressively despite limited hardware, he developed Othello programs for the HP-41C programmable calculator, ZX81, and possibly the TI-58 and Casio FX-502 calculators.

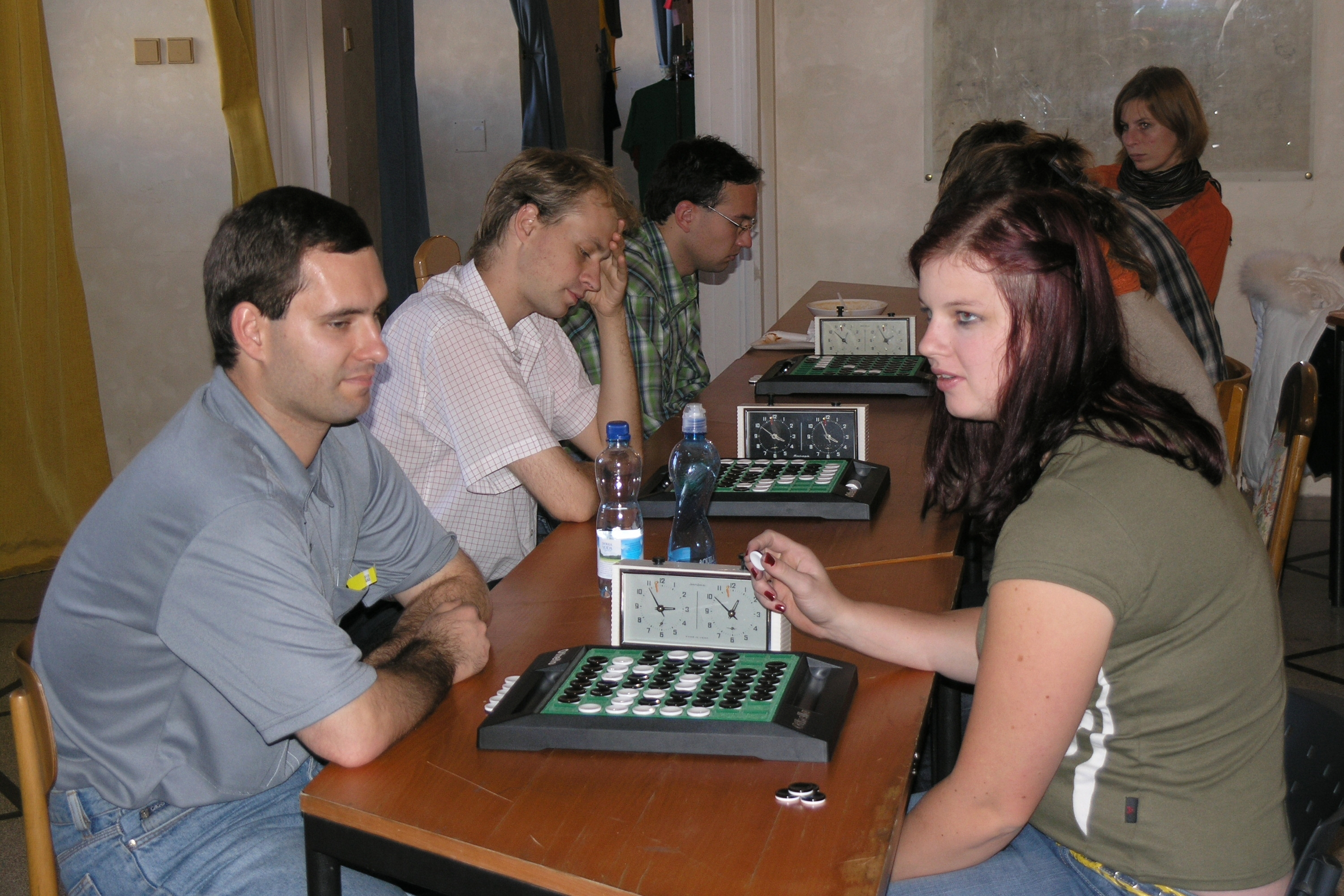
Vincent Baillet honed his skills in Othello programming tournaments (here, players at the 2008 Deskohraní festival in Prague).

During this period, L'Ordinateur Individuel hosted annual international Othello programming tournaments at SICOB. Baillet competed multiple times, initially with calculator programs and later with a ZX81 version, gaining recognition in 1982 and 1983. In 1982, among 200 competitors across three categories, he placed third in the "compiled programs" category with his ZX81 program, written entirely in Zilog Z80 machine code. The other categories were "interpreted programs" and "pocket computers."

Still a high school student, Baillet refined his program the following year, enabling it to play against itself to optimize strategies. The program assigned weights to variables for black and white pieces, adjusting them based on game outcomes to find an optimal balance. A key challenge was the unreliable cassette storage medium. In 1983, his ZX81 program, now a prototype for Reversi Champion, placed second among 96 competitors, including 20 in the compiled programs category.

=== Release of Oric and Sega SC-3000 versions ===
Baillet approached Laurent Weill of Loriciels to develop an Oric 1 version, securing a contract immediately. To appeal to a broader audience, he introduced weaker difficulty levels, possibly incorporating randomness in lower-level computer responses.

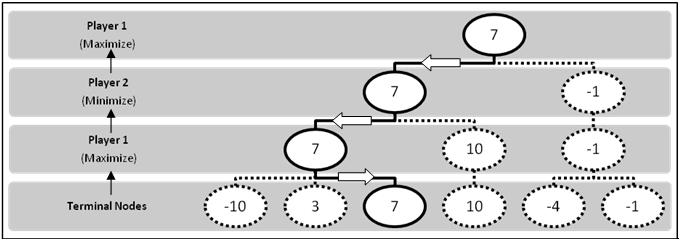
In the minimax algorithm, Player 1 seeks the highest value, and Player 2 the lowest, among possible outcomes (see "Terminal nodes"). The highlighted path shows successive choices.

Drawing on articles from L'Ordinateur Individuel and Micro-Systèmes, as well as the book Chess Skill in Man and Machine, Baillet implemented a minimax algorithm with alpha-beta pruning and other optimization techniques. The algorithm evaluates all possible moves and responses to a set depth.

At Loriciels' request, Baillet also developed the Sega SC-3000 version, which closely resembled the Oric version and posed no significant development challenges. Although the Oric version was ready earlier, Loriciels delayed its release to launch both versions simultaneously in 1984. Baillet earned 10 francs per copy sold, with each retailing for approximately 100 francs. (Note: Contemporary advertisements suggest a retail price of 140 FF.)

=== Cancellation of the PC-compatible version ===
In 1982, Digital Equipment Corporation (DEC) released the Rainbow 100, a hybrid computer supporting VT100, CP/M, CP/M-86, and MS-DOS. DEC commissioned a port of Reversi Champion, which Baillet developed, but the project was abandoned, and he received no compensation.

=== Amstrad CPC adaptation ===
For the Amstrad CPC version, Loriciels did not involve Baillet, despite his expertise. Instead, Jacques Métois created a new adaptation, released in 1986, seemingly independent of the earlier versions.

== Reception ==
=== Sales ===
Vincent Baillet estimated that approximately 1,000 copies were sold for each of the Oric and Sega SC-3000 versions.

=== Critical response ===
Contemporary reviews highlighted the game's strengths. The Oric version's ease of use was praised by Théoric and Jeux & Stratégie, while the CPC version's joystick controls, likened to a mouse, were lauded by CPC and Hebdogiciel. The Oric version's presentation was described as "pleasant" and "polished" by Théoric and "very good" by Jeux & Stratégie. The CPC version's interface and windowed options were commended by Amstar's Yannick Bourrée and Hebdogiciel. CPC appreciated the CPC version's extensive options and clear manual, as did Jeux & Stratégie for the Oric manual. Amstrad Magazine's Frédéric Nardeau noted the CPC version's fast cassette loading. Théoric gave a glowing review of the Oric adaptation, and Jeux & Stratégie's Michel Brassinne called it "excellent," awarding it 5/5 for accessibility and overall quality. Five issues later, Brassinne and Emmanuel Lazard, a French Othello champion, gave it 3/5, ranking it second among eight Othello programs. For the CPC version, Micro V.O.'s Yves Huitric praised its varied openings and six difficulty levels. Tilt found it "interesting" and "well-designed," rating it 5/6. Hebdogiciel named it "Software of the Week" and the best Othello game, a view echoed by Nardeau, who gave it 5/5 for interest and difficulty.

The CPC version's algorithm was praised by Bourrée and Hebdogiciel for challenging amateurs early on, with Tilt noting its suitability for beginners. Bruno de la Boisserie, a former French Othello Federation secretary, rated all versions as medium to strong, depending on the difficulty, and fully compliant with Othello rules. (Note: Rated on a scale from very weak to strong.) Brassinne noted the French Othello Federation's endorsement of the Oric version. However, Lazard criticized the CPC algorithm for poor tactics—focusing on both central and edge squares, ineffective against skilled players—and delayed move evaluation. He found it "pleasant" but inferior to the Oric version, limiting beginner progress. Baillet also deemed the CPC version's level "weak."

Other critiques included a lack of originality, rated 2/5 for Oric by Brassinne and 0/5 for CPC by Lazard. Brassinne questioned the Oric version's hints, which failed to secure wins if followed consistently. Baillet explained that hints used a shallower depth-first search, favoring the computer. Tilt echoed this for the CPC, warning against blindly following hints. They praised its speed but noted longer thinking times at higher levels. Nardeau criticized the CPC version's lack of confirmation for the "New" option, risking unintended game resets. Hebdogiciel found the CPC graphics lackluster, while Tilt called them standard, rating them 4/6. Conversely, Amstrad Magazine found them "clear and pleasant," awarding 4/5.

== Legacy ==
In 1997, Jacques Métois, the CPC version's developer, drew inspiration from Reversi Champion to create Othello Windows for Microsoft Windows 16-bit and 32-bit systems.

== See also ==
- Reversi
- ZX81
- Minimax
