= Quadrel =

1991 video game

- Cover art
- Developer: Loriciels
- Publisher: Loriciels
- Designer: Christophe Delmaere
- Platforms: Amiga, Amstrad CPC, Atari ST, MS-DOS
- Release: June 1991
- Genre: Puzzle
- Mode: Single-player

Quadrel is a puzzle video game developed by Loriciels and released in June 1991. It was released for MS-DOS, Amiga, Atari ST, and Amstrad CPC

== Gameplay ==
The game consists of a series of screens composed of patterns created by criss-crossing lines. the object of the game is to color the image entirely by using the four or less colours available in each screen. The same color can not be used to fill in adjacent shapes, requiring the player to form a strategy in order to complete each screen. Each screen is treated as a separate game. Two modes of play are available. The basic mode is a timed challenge for a single player, the player is scored by the number of seconds they spend to complete each screen. The main mode is for two players or a single player against the computer. In this mode the number of times each color may be used is limited. The player who cannot take their turn due to the placement of colors on the screen or the lack appropriate colors available to use loses.

== Reception ==
The game received poor to mixed reviews, varying from 37% to 76%.
