= Navy SEALs (video game) =

1990–1991 video game

- Developer: Ocean Software
- Publisher: Ocean Software
- Programmer: John Meegan
- Artist: Stephen Thomson
- Composer: Matthew Cannon
- Platforms: Amstrad CPC, GX4000, Commodore 64, Amiga, Atari ST, ZX Spectrum, Game Boy
- Release: UK: 1990; NA: 1991; EU: 1991
- Genres: Platform, shoot 'em up
- Mode: Single-player

Navy SEALs is a shoot 'em up platform video game developed and published by Ocean Software. It was first released in the United Kingdom for the Amstrad CPC, GX4000 and Commodore 64 in 1990. It was later re-released in the rest of Europe for the ZX Spectrum, Atari ST and Amiga home computers in the following year. It was then ported to the Game Boy on 1 September 1991 in the United States. The game is based on the film of the same name and follows the protagonist, Lieutenant Dale Hawkins, progressing through five side-scrolling levels.

The game was developed by Ocean Software, renowned for creating video games based on films and other licensed properties. Navy SEALs focuses on Hawkins recovering caches of Stinger missiles from Arab soldiers in the Middle East. The game received positive reviews upon release, with critics mainly praising the graphics, presentation and challenging gameplay, but the criticism was directed at the ZX Spectrum port, which received disapproval over its monochrome graphics.

== Gameplay ==
A screenshot from the first level of the game. The interface displays Hawkins' health, time remaining, selected weapon, and number of lives.

The game is a side-scrolling shoot 'em up and revolves around the protagonist, Lieutenant Dale Hawkins, recovering caches of hidden Stinger missiles from Arab terrorists in Oman. The game features a total of five levels with varying locations and begins with allocating five lives to the player. The main objective of the game is to locate and place time bombs on boxes containing Stinger missiles, in which the player is required to escape before the time runs out. The enemies featured in the game are Arab terrorists; the player must neutralise them by shooting them with their selected weapon, which is a handgun by default. Other weapons available in the game include machine guns, rocket launchers, and a flamethrower, which are only accessible through finding hidden crates.

The second level of the game is in Beirut, and focuses on the player, along with a group of Navy SEALs, rescuing hostages in a 3D presentation of the city. If the player is successful in rescuing the hostages and recovering all missiles, the remaining forces will rendezvous at a submarine. During the game, the player-character may grapple onto ledges, climb ladders, crawl, and jump in any direction. The player can also push large crates in order to reach higher platforms. Combat is focused on shooting an enemy with a weapon on sight, but the player can crawl at any time in order to avoid the oncoming bullets of an enemy. The player is also able to neutralise enemies by dropping down onto them whilst dangling from a higher platform. In every level, the game sets a time limit when a bomb is placed on one of the crates containing Stinger missiles.

== Background ==
The music for Navy SEALs was composed by Matthew Cannon, an employee of Ocean Software.

== Reception ==
Reception

Review scores
Publication	Score
Crash	94%
Computer and Video Games	75%
Raze	88%
Your Sinclair	86%
Commodore Format	81%
Mean Machines	76%

Awards
Publication	Award
Crash	Crash Smash
Sinclair User	SU Classic

The game received mostly positive reviews upon release. Richard Smith of Crash heralded the graphics for their detail, colour and smooth animation, summarising that it was a "landmark in every aspect". Chris Jenkins of Sinclair User wrote that the graphics and animation were "fabulous", whilst focusing particular praise on the game's background details. Jeff Matthews of Raze praised the graphics for both Amstrad GX4000 and Commodore 64 ports, heralding them as "nicely detailed" and "super-smoothly animated", respectively. Matt Bielby of Your Sinclair praised the presentation and gameplay, citing them both as "out of the ordinary", whilst also praising the developer's attention for detail. Steve Fielder of Commodore Format praised the game's ability to fully utilise the colour palette of the Commodore 64, in which Fielder praised the "smooth" side scrolling levels and "wonderfully" detailed backdrops.

Two reviewers of Mean Machines praised the sprites and background drops, calling both "cleverly animated" and "atmospheric". However, the other reviewer criticised the game's hard difficulty. Robert Swan of Computer and Video Games criticised the playability of the ZX Spectrum version, calling it "less playable" due to its presentation in monochrome and hard difficulty. Reviewing the GX4000 port, Swann praised the "colourful" graphics, but expressed scepticism over the difficulty. Fielder also praised the game's soundtrack as "mystifying".
