= Ronnie Deleon =

American kickboxer

Ronnie "Diamond" Deleon, from Corpus Christi, Texas, is a two-time World Kickboxing Champion. He has won the following professional titles:

- 1987 W.K.A. Super Welterweight North American Champion
- 1989 W.K.A. Super Welterweight World Champion
- 1993 K.I.C.K. Light Heavyweight North American Champion
- 1994 K.I.C.K. Light Heavyweight World Champion
- 1997 F.F.K.A. Light Heavyweight North American Champion
