= Mandragore (video game) =

1984 video game

- Developer: Infogrames
- Publisher: Infogrames
- Platforms: Commodore 64; Apple II; MSX; Thomson MO5; Thomson TO7/70; ZX Spectrum
- Release: 1984

Mandragore is a 1984 video game from Infogrames.

== Gameplay ==
The kingdom once ruled peacefully by King Jorian collapses into chaos after a sudden fall of shooting stars kills him, allowing the evil tyrant Yarod‑Nor to seize power. A band of warriors rises to oppose him, and the player begins by creating a four‑member party, selecting each character's occupation, race, sex, and attributes before naming them and setting out. Instead of buying supplies from an innkeeper, players must find objects in villages or châteaux and sell them to local buyers to raise money for needed equipment. Exploration begins in a map‑based view where movement is typed as N, S, E, or W, and the scrolling display shows terrain features. Entering a château reveals about thirty rooms and dungeons filled with monsters, treasures, and puzzles that must be overcome before reaching Yarod‑Nor. The screen layout shows the current area, the four characters, nearby objects and monsters, and a text‑input zone where abbreviated two‑letter commands control actions. Characters are directed by selecting their number and issuing commands such as attacking, provided they carry the proper weapon. The party may also be split to search multiple rooms at once, though lone members face greater danger.

== Reception ==
Reception

Review scores
Publication	Score
Aktueller Software Markt	9/10
Commodore User	4/10
Your Computer	4/5
Zzap!64	65%

Your Computer praised the game's easy-to-understand instructions. Commodore User criticised the game's sound.

Mandragore sold 70,000 copies. It won the Arcade Prize from the Ministry of Culture.
