= Panza Kick Boxing =

1990 video game

- Developer: Futura
- Publisher: Loriciels
- Platforms: Amiga, Amstrad CPC, Atari ST, MS-DOS, TurboGrafx-16, TurboGrafx CD
- Release: Early 1991
- Genre: Fighting

Panza Kick Boxing (Note: The game is also known as Panza's Kick Boxing, André Panza Kick Boxing or André Panza's Kick Boxing.) is a French fighting video game developed by Futura and originally published by Loriciels in 1991. The game is a video game adaptation of Thai kick boxing. It received high critical praise particularly for its graphics and gameplay while receiving minor criticism for its repetitiveness. A sequel with various names to distance from the Panza endorsement, including Best of the Best: Championship Karate in the United States, was released a few years later.

== Plot and gameplay ==
The player controls a kick boxer who fights their way up the league table defeating opponents, while their ultimate goal is to challenge the Champion André Panza and take his title. The Gymnasium section allows the player to train their character to improve one of three skills - strength, resistance, and reflex - which will improve their performance in future fights.

The game contains a total of 56 kicks and punches, which players can assign to one of the 8 joystick movements to customise their boxer's fighting style. Moves inspired by real-life kick boxing include long sweeps, short jabs, and crunching kicks.

The two boxers are viewed from ring level, and a referee is present to call 'break' or count you out; each bout takes at least three rounds and each round ends either when a boxer is KO-ed or the timer runs out. A row of lights above the ring are a visual cue to how close the player is to losing, which extinguish as they are hit.

== Development and release ==
The game was developed by Futura. It was endorsed by French kickboxing then-champion André Panza, who also supplied technical advice. It contains realistic attacking and defensive moves, and around 600 frames of animation.

Panza Kick Boxing was originally published by Loriciels in France in 1991, and subsequently by NEC Technologies in the United States and Kixx (the budget range of U.S. Gold) in the United Kingdom, Germany, and Italy. The game was a new venture for NEC, which has previously built a business off their TV Sports series of events. Additionally, the game was published on the TurboGrafx-16 by Turbo Technologies, a joint venture by NEC and Hudson Soft.

== Reception ==
Reception

Review scores
Publication	Score
Joystick	98%, 86%, 80%, 75%
Generation 4	92%
Amiga Action	90%, 87%
The Australian Commodore and Amiga Review (ACAR)	85%
Zero	84%
CU Amiga	82%
Amiga Joker	81%
Datormagazin	80%
Amiga User International	75%
Power Play	65%
Aktueller Software Markt	100%
Tilt	C
Go	81%
Special Program	Positive

ST Action and TurboPlay described it as "tremendous" and "fantastic" respectively, while Amiga Computing deemed it "extremely good". Adam Smith from Rock Paper Shotgun praised the animations for the referee. Games Village called it "one of the best Kickboxing simulators ever produced in history".

Mixed reviews were offered by reviewers like Tony Horgan of Amiga User International who criticised the game's repetitiveness which he argued is standard for this genre.

Italian site Games Village discussed how the "modest...pixel portrait of the solemn André Panza" on the cover juxtaposed the quality of the game in a larger discussion about how "the palatability of a video game is not necessarily linked to the actual value of its gameplay, nor to its technical prowess".

Commenting on the contemporary context in which the game was developed, TurboPlay suggested that with Champions Forever Boxing (1991) and Panza Kick Boxing saturating the TurboGrafx-16 market, it was unlikely for Cinemaware to release their TV Sports Boxing on the platform.

== Legacy ==
A 1992 sequel was announced in October 1992 tentatively titled Panza Kick Boxing 2. The game, closer in design to a re-release, was published in Japan as The Kick Boxing (Micro World) and Super Kickboxing (Electro Brain) as Panza was unknown in the country. This updated version was later imported in the United States by Electro Brain as Best of the Best: Championship Karate in July 1993. The game has also been subtitled Panza Gold Edition.

Amiga Joker noted that while the gameplay, graphics, sound and options screen had been updated from the original, "apart from the title there are only a few real innovations", describing it as a "deceptive package". MegaTech suggested the latter title was an effort to tie the game to the 1989 martial arts film Best of the Best. Sega Zone described it as "one of the most differingly-named [sic] games in the history of gaming". The Australian Commodore and Amiga Review noted that while the game is officially a sequel, it's "almost a reproduction".

In contrast to the original, this version received a mixed reception in Europe, and Asia. However, actor and martial artist Ron Yuan deemed it the "best SNES fighting game from a purely technical martial arts point of view", while Brazilian magazine Ação Games described it as "one of the best games of the genre" and one that fans of Luta Livre would enjoy. Super Action further deemed it "classic kick boxing action".
