= Jim Power: The Lost Dimension in 3-D =

1993 video game

- North American cover art
- Developers: Loriciel; Piko Interactive (NES)
- Publishers: EU: Loriciel; NA: Electro Brain; WW: Piko Interactive
- Platforms: Super NES, MS-DOS, Windows, Mega Drive/Genesis, NES, Switch, PlayStation 4
- Release: Super NES: NA: December 1993; WW: 2021; MS-DOS: EU: 1993; NA: 1993; Windows: WW: September 30, 2015 Mega Drive/Genesis; WW: 2021 NES; WW: 2021 Switch, PS4; WW: June 2, 2022
- Genre: Platform
- Mode: Single-player

Jim Power: The Lost Dimension in 3-D is a 1993 platform video game developed by Loriciel and published by Electro Brain for the Super Nintendo Entertainment System and MS-DOS. A Sega Genesis version was developed but never released. In 2021, Piko Interactive recovered this version and crowdfunded a release, alongside a new Nintendo Entertainment System port. A version for the Nintendo Switch and PlayStation 4 was released on June 2, 2022.

== Gameplay ==
The game has several contrasting modes of gameplay, including side-view platforming, top-view, and horizontal shoot 'em up. It follows Jim Power in Mutant Planet as a different title, but at the same time reinterpreting the original game by taking many basic elements and levels from it. The soundtrack was composed by Chris Hülsbeck of Turrican fame.

It is a 2D game using many layers of parallax scrolling backgrounds to give a greater sense of depth. The three-dimensionality implied in the title was effected by 3D glasses that were packaged with the game, using the Pulfrich effect to provide a unique "3D" experience for the time when polygonal 3D graphics were rudimentary and too expensive to implement. The 3D feeling could also be related to the overhead stages, showing rotating effects in the same vein as those depicted in similar games like Contra III: The Alien Wars.

== Different Versions ==
A version of this game was also developed for the Mega Drive/Genesis under the name Jim Power: The Arcade Game. However, despite being in an almost complete state, this title was never published and remained unreleased until a ROM image was eventually leaked. This unpublished version features all levels and cannot be finished, although only a single music track (once again, arranged by Chris Hulsbeck) is present in the whole game and it uses placeholder sound effects from Mega Turrican. Jim Power: The Arcade Game is mostly the same game as Jim Power: The Lost Dimension in 3-D, albeit with some minor graphical differences derived from technical aspects. All the top-view stages were also replaced by additional shoot-'em-up levels, hence the rebranded title of this version depicting a further arcade experience rather than a "3D" one. In 2021, a fully finished version of the game was released by Piko Interactive. Retaining the same Jim Power: The Lost Dimension in 3-D title of its counterpart versions, it restores the ending, music tracks and sound effects which were missing in the known prototype version, together with some other minor game polishing.

A brand new NES version was also developed from scratch by Piko Interactive to go along the long lost Mega Drive/Genesis version and modern re-releases of previous versions of the game.

== Music ==
The music in Jim Power: The Lost Dimension in 3-D was directly influenced by the music from the video game series Ys, as can be noted when comparing Jim Power's "Forgotten Path" and Ys III's "A Searing Struggle". In an interview, composer Chris Hülsbeck admits that the sound between these two songs is similar, but states that it was not done on purpose. "Inadvertently a melody from the Ys series must have slipped deep into my subconscious because one of the melodies of Jim Power turned out extremely similar".

== Reception ==
The game received average reviews. Nintendo Power scored it 3.125 out of 5, while the reviewers of Electronic Gaming Monthly scored it an average of 6 out of 10.
