= Jim Power in Mutant Planet =

1992 video game

- Developers: Digital Concept; Loriciel
- Publishers: EU: Loriciel; JP: Micro World; WW: Piko Interactive
- Designers: Fernando Velez; Guillaume Dubail
- Programmers: Fernando Velez (Amiga); Alain Boisramé (Atari ST); Jean-Marc Lebourg (Amstrad CPC); Alain Fernandes (TurboGrafx-CD)
- Artist: Guillaume Dubail
- Composer: Chris Hülsbeck
- Platforms: Amiga, Atari ST, Amstrad CPC, TurboGrafx-CD, Amiga CD32
- Release: Amiga, Atari, Amstrad: EU: 1992; TurboGrafx-CD: JP: March 19, 1993; Amiga CD32: WW: 2021
- Genre: Platform
- Mode: Single-player

Jim Power in Mutant Planet is a platform video game developed by Digital Concept and published by Loriciel for the Amiga, Atari ST and Amstrad CPC in 1992. It was also released by Micro World for the TurboGrafx-CD in 1993 exclusively in Japan. The game features several contrasting modes of gameplay, including side-view platforming, top-view, and horizontal shoot 'em up.

The soundtrack was composed by Chris Hülsbeck.

== Legacy ==
A different game retaining certain aspects and levels from Jim Power in Mutant Planet was released for other platforms as Jim Power: The Lost Dimension in 3-D.

In 2021, Piko Interactive crowdfunded a re-release of the Japanese TurboGrafx-CD version as well as a port to the Amiga CD32.
