= RoboCop 2 (video game) =

1990 video game

- Cover art for the initial home computer versions
- Developer: Special FX (Note: Commodore 64, Game Boy, and NES versions developed by Painting by Numbers; arcade version developed by Data East; ZX Spectrum and Amstrad CPC versions developed by Ocean Software.)
- Publishers: Ocean Software: Arcade; Data East; NES; EU: Ocean Software; NA: Data East
- Directors: Arcade; Men Taiko
- Designers: Arcade; Toru Kikuchi
- Programmers: Ian Moran: Atari ST; Keith Robinson; Arcade; Takaaki Inoue; Yasuhiko Nomura; Masao Ishikawa; C64; Mark Rogers; Chris Kerry
- Artists: List: Amiga; Karen Davies; Colin Rushby; Atari ST; Andy Rixon; Arcade; Tomo Adachi; C64; Steven Kerry; Jon Beard
- Composers: Keith Tinman: Game Boy, NES, C64; Jonathan Dunn; Arcade; Tatsuya Kiuchi; Tomoyoshi Sato
- Series: RoboCop
- Platforms: Amiga, GX4000, Atari ST, Game Boy, ZX Spectrum, Arcade, NES, Commodore 64
- Release: November 1990: Amiga; EU: November 1990 Atari ST, GX4000; EU: December 1990 Game Boy; EU: December 1990; NA: November 1991 ZX Spectrum; UK: 1990 Arcade; JP: March 1991 NES; NA: April 1991; PAL: 1991 C64; EU: 1991
- Genres: Platform, shooter
- Mode: Single-player

RoboCop 2 is a 1990 platform shooter video game based on the film of the same name. The game was released for several platforms, including Amiga, GX4000, Atari ST, Commodore 64, Game Boy, Nintendo Entertainment System, and ZX Spectrum. Ocean Software developed and published several versions, and Data East manufactured an arcade version.

A sequel, RoboCop 3, was released in 1991, itself based on the film of the same name.

== Gameplay ==
RoboCop 2 is based on the 1990 film of the same name, in which a Detroit cyborg cop known as RoboCop must stop drug distributor Cain from spreading a new drug known as Nuke. The Game Boy and Nintendo Entertainment System (NES) versions are primarily shoot 'em up games. They differ from the Amiga, GX4000 and Commodore 64 versions, which also differ from each other. In addition to side-scrolling platform levels, the Amiga and ZX Spectrum versions include other levels consisting of first-person shooting galleries – an aspect from the original RoboCop game – and a puzzle game in which the player must help RoboCop remember his memories by arranging certain electronic chips.

== Development and release ==
The Amiga and Atari ST versions were developed by Special FX and published by Ocean Software, which also developed the NES and Game Boy versions. Programming of the Amiga version began months before the film's release. As a guide, the Special FX development team was given a pre-release version of the film that excluded several scenes. The team was also given a preliminary script of the film and pictures of the characters. Audio samples from the film, including RoboCop's gunfire and footsteps, were added into the Amiga version. The ZX Spectrum and Amiga versions include digitized scenes from the film.

In the United Kingdom, Ocean released the Amiga version in November 1990, followed by the release of the Amstrad GX4000, Game Boy and Atari ST versions the following month. A Nintendo Entertainment System (NES) version had been released in the United States by April 1991. An arcade version, manufactured by Data East, was also released in 1991.

== Reception ==
Reception

Review scores
Publication	Score
Crash	93% (ZX Spectrum)
Computer and Video Games	83% (ZX Spectrum); 85% (Amiga)
Famitsu	4/10, 6/10, 7/10, 5/10 (NES)
Sinclair User	91% (ZX Spectrum)
Your Sinclair	93% (ZX Spectrum)
ACE	800/1000 (Amiga/Atari ST)
Amiga Computing	78% (Amiga)
Amiga Format	80% (Amiga)
Amiga Power	3/5 (Amiga)
Commodore Force	90% (Commodore 64)
CU Amiga	83% (Amiga)
Mean Machines	74% (Amstrad GX4000)
Raze	91% (Amiga)
The One	86% (Amiga)
Zero	90% (Amiga/Atari ST)
VideoGame	4/5 (NES)

Awards
Publication	Award
Sinclair User	SU Classic
Crash	Readers' Award: Best Overall Game (1990)
Your Sinclair	Top 5 Readers' Games (fifth place; 1990)

The Amiga version received praise for its graphics and sound, but some reviewers criticized its lack of originality. Raze called it "challenging and extremely well presented" and noted the "especially addictive" puzzle sections. The One, reviewing the Amiga version, considered the game to be an improvement over its predecessor, particularly for its platform-based gameplay. However, The One noted that the game omitted several notable sequences from the film. CU Amiga praised the "addictive" gameplay and called RoboCop 2 "the best licensed product" of 1990. Maff Evans of Amiga Format criticized the difficult controls, but praised the gameplay, calling it "enjoyable". Amiga Power also criticized the controls, while Amiga Computing criticized the game's difficulty. Computer and Video Games, reviewing the Amiga and ZX Spectrum versions, noted the difficult gameplay as well.

The One also reviewed the arcade version of RoboCop 2 in 1991, calling it "an uninspired follow-up to the original arcade smash. A few bells and whistles have been added, but although the sprites are bigger than last time out, the overall graphic quality is lower." The One furthermore expresses that "You'd have to be a real fan to get much out of this."

The Atari ST version received praise for its graphics and sound, as did the ZX Spectrum version. Crash praised the ZX Spectrum version for its various gameplay styles, stating that they make RoboCop 2 "one of the few games actually worth the asking price!" Crash concluded that the game was "fast, furious, addictive and a hell of a lot of fun to play!" Your Sinclair, reviewing the ZX Spectrum version, considered the game to be better than its predecessor, noting larger levels and stating that the game was "one of the best film conversions Ocean have ever done".

Mean Machines praised the graphics of the Amstrad GX4000 version, but criticized the "incredibly frustrating" gameplay. Commodore Format praised the sound and gameplay of the Commodore 64 version, but criticized the "gaudy" graphics, stating that they lacked atmosphere. Nintendo Power, reviewing the NES version, noted that the character of RoboCop can be initially difficult to control.

In Japan, Game Machine listed the arcade version of RoboCop 2 as the 24th most successful table arcade unit of April 1991.

The ZX Spectrum version won "Best Game Overall" in the 1990 Crash Readers' Awards, after being chosen by 21 percent of the magazine's readers. The ZX Spectrum version also won fifth place in the 1990 Your Sinclair Readers' Awards, and by April 1991 had reached second place in UK sales behind Teenage Mutant Hero Turtles.
