= Tennis Cup =

1990 video game

- Developer: Loriciel
- Publishers: Loriciel: Home computers; FR: Loriciel; EU/NA: Electronic Zoo TurboGrafx-16; NA: NEC Technologies PC Engine CD; JP: Micro World Super NES; EU: Loriciel; NA: Taito; JP: Micro World Mega Drive/Genesis; WW: Tengen
- Platforms: Amiga, Atari ST, MS-DOS, Amstrad CPC, TurboGrafx-16, PC Engine CD, Super NES, Mega Drive/Genesis
- Release: EU/NA: 1990 (home computers); NA: 1991 (T-16); JP: 1992 (PCE-CD); WW: 1993 (SNES, MD)
- Genre: Sports
- Modes: Single-player, multiplayer

Tennis Cup is a 1990 tennis video game developed and published by Loriciel for the Amiga. It was ported to the Atari ST, MS-DOS and Amstrad CPC during the same year. Tennis Cup was ported to TurboGrafx-16 in 1991 as Davis Cup Tennis. (Note: PC Engine CD title: The Davis Cup Tennis) Versions for the Super NES (International Tennis Tour) and Mega Drive/Genesis (Davis Cup World Tour) were released in 1993. (Note: North American Genesis title: Davis Cup Tennis)

The Amstrad version received a sequel, Tennis Cup 2, in 1990. A 16-bit sequel, also titled Tennis Cup 2, was released in 1992 for the Amiga, Atari ST, and MS-DOS.

== Gameplay ==
=== 16-bit home computers ===
The screen is split horizontally with both players seen from a behind the back viewpoint, even in single-player. The player is competing against 32 computer players, each with their own skills and weaknesses. You can adjust your skills at the beginning, with six basic types of shots to choose from: service, forehand, backhand, forehand volley, backhand volley, and smash. At first, each type has a 50% skill rating, but there are 30 percentage points to distribute. One type of shot can be weakened to strengthen another. New computer players can be created by adjusting the percentages and they can be saved to a disk. In practice mode, the player can play against a ball machine. There are four court types: clay, indoor, hard, or grass. There are five tournaments: Wimbledon, US Open, Australian Open, French Open, and Davis Cup. They can be entered individually, or in a marathon-style championship that links all five competitions together.

Unlike the first game Tennis Cup 2 can be played in full screen in single- or multiplayer. A new feature has been added to the game that allows for two human players to play a doubles match against a single computer opponent. According to Amiga Format, Tennis Cup 2 features "better character animation and more user-friendly options".

=== SNES ===
There are practice, exhibition, and career mode where the player is given a generous number of dollars and must compete on the world tennis circuit in order to gain more money. The player can only play as a male tennis player. During the exhibition mode, the rules can be altered along with the opponent.

Players can either represent themselves in a singles tournament, a two-person team in a doubles tournament or their respective home country in a "Nations Cup" tournament It takes approximately 52 in-game weeks in order for a player in career mode to go from being the worst tennis player in the world to being the best tennis player in the world.

Passwords are given out at the end of each match in order to players to continue their progress at a later date.

== Reception ==
Reception

Review scores
Publication	Score
Aktueller Software Markt	9/12 (Amiga, ST); 8/12 (DOS); 7/12 (PCE)
Computer and Video Games	85% (Amiga)
Electronic Gaming Monthly	27/40 (MD)
Mean Machines Sega	90% (MD)
The Games Machine (UK)	83% (Amiga); 85% (ST)
Amiga Joker	71%

Award
Publication	Award
C+VG	Hit

=== Home computers and PC Engine ===
Computer and Video Games concluded: "What makes Tennis Cup so outstanding, though, is the presentation - apart from some niggly disk loading times, there's great scope for changing all the parameters from player statistics to the type, length and difficulty of a match" The Games Machine noted that "Playability is good but not exceptional." and recommended the game slightly over Pro Tennis Tour. The Atari ST version was said to have better graphics and sound effects. It was called the best tennis game on the Atari ST along with International 3D Tennis. Aktueller Software Markt said Tennis Cup is better than Pro Tennis Tour but worse than Tie Break. They noted that the Atari ST version has better animation than the Amiga version. Comparing tennis games on the PC Engine, they recommended World Court Tennis and Final Match Tennis instead of Davis Cup. Amiga Joker said the screen size is insufficient, the animations are unimpressive, and the controls are sluggish.

CU Amiga called Tennis Cup 2 almost identical to the first game and recommended to get Advantage Tennis instead. Zero said "it's very addictive at first, but play for a while and it can become really infuriating, crossing the thin line between addictiveness and frustration."

=== Mega Drive ===
Mean Machines Sega called the game "[t]he best and surely the definitive and unquestionably grooviest tennis game for the Megadrive." One reviewer from Electronic Gaming Monthly called the game "[a] good, solid tennis game", another one said "[i]t doesn't have everything I'd like to see in a tennis game, but it's a worthwhile effort."

== See also ==
- Davis Cup Tennis
