= Visiware =

French interactive television agency

Visiware logo

Visiware was a French interactive television agency operating in Europe and North America.

Founded in 1994 by Laurant Weill, Visiware is a French publisher and distributor of video games for interactive television, mobile phone and internet, and a specialist in casual gaming. Its main interactive channel Playin' TV, airs on more than 30 cable, satellite and ADSL networks in 77 countries. Since October 2009, Visiware is also the head of a skill gaming website, PlayinStar.

In 2010, Visiware created PlayAlong, a new system that allows synchronisation between TV and mobile devices as TV shows are broadcasting. The first TV show to use this system is The Million Pound Drop. TV viewers could play and answer the questions as they were appearing -and their answers revealed- on TV. In 2018 Visiware became play.works
