= Laurant Weill =

French entrepreneur

Laurent Weill, whose first name is sometimes spelled 'Laurant' is an entrepreneur and a pioneer of the microcomputer and video game industry in France and later on new interactive digital experiences. In 1983 he co-founded with Marc Bayle the first French videogame company, Loriciel, which has quickly become one of the leading publishers of video games for personal computers in France. He participated in the creation of many companies such as Loriciel, Microids, Evolution, Broderbund France. In 1994 Weill founded Visiware. He has become a world leader in interactive television. Visiware has also many other activities (PlayinStar, PlayAlong, LeStudio). In 2014 Weill created SYNC a spin off Visiware who is providing interactive 2nd screen platforms to enrich mobile experiences and advertising revenues. He invented and patented a new technology solution Sync2AD to synchronize Mobile with TV and radio.
