= Loriciel =

French video game development company

Loriciel Loriciels Virtual Studio
- Final logo
- Industry: Video games
- Founded: 1983
- Defunct: 1995
- Headquarters: France
- Key people: Marc Bayle; Laurant Weill

Loriciel (also sometimes Loriciels) was a French video game developing company that was active from 1983 to the early 1990s. The name is a combination of logiciel, the French word for software, and Oric, the first computer it wrote software for.

During the 1980s, it developed games for various systems (Oric 1, ZX81, ZX Spectrum, Amstrad CPC, Thomson computers, the Amiga and the Atari ST). The first game that Loriciel developed was Hubert for the Commodore 64. It managed to publish 150 different games within its short lifespan as a company. While several attempts were made to revive the company (first as Loriciel then Virtual Studio), financial difficulties would force this company to shut down after developing Tommy Moe's Winter Extreme: Skiing & Snowboarding for the Super Nintendo Entertainment System.

== Video games ==
=== Personal computers ===
==== Amstrad CPC ====
- Empire (1985)
- Dianne (1985)
- Rally II (1985)
- Foot Marius Tresor (1985)
- Le 5eme Axe (1985)
- Tony Truand (1985)
- Orphée: Le Voyage Aux Enfers (1985)
- Le Mystère De Kikekankoi (1985)
- Le Diamant De L'ile Maudite (1985)
- Planete Base (1985)
- Torann (1985)
- 3D Fight (1985)
- Lorigraph (1985)
- Pearl Harbour (1985)
- Bob Winner (1986)
- Pouvoir (1986)
- Marche Commun (1986)
- Reversi Champion (1986)
- Bactron (1986)
- Top Secret (1986)
- Sapiens (1986)
- Le Pacte (1986)
- Les Templiers D'Orven (1986)
- MGT: The Magnetik Tank (1986)
- Billy La Banlieue 1 (1986)
- L'Aigle d'Or (1986)
- Infernal Runner (1986)
- Des chiffres et des lettres (1987)
- Star Trap (1988)
- Mata Hari (1988)
- Space Racer (1988)
- Skweek (1989)
- Tennis Cup (1990)
- Tennis Cup 2 (1990)
- Disc (1990)
- Moon Blaster (1990)
- Quadrel (1991)
- Super Skweek (1991)
- Bumpy's Arcade Fantasy (1992)
- Jim Power in Mutant Planet (1992)
- Tiny Skweeks (1992)

==== Amstrad PCW ====
- Orphée: Le Voyage Aux Enfers (1985)
- Bob Winner (1987)

==== Atari ST ====
- Magnetic Tank (1986)
- Quasar (1986)
- Bob Winner (1987)
- Sapiens (1987)
- Mach 3 (1987)
- Mission (1987)
- Space Racer (1988)
- Star Trap (1988)
- Turbo Cup (1988)
- Mata Hari (1988)
- Bumpy (1989)
- Westphaser (Steve McQueen) (1989)
- A320 (1989)
- Sherman M4 (1989)
- Pinball Magic (1989)
- Skweek (1989)
- Tennis Cup (1990)
- Moon Blaster (1990)
- Quadrel (1991)
- Disc (1990)
- Super Skweek (1990)
- Time Race (1990)
- Builderland (1990)
- Out Board (1990)
- Dark Sat (1990)
- Harricana - Raid International Motoneige (1990)
- Gem Stone Legend (1990)
- Guardians (1991)
- Booly (1991)
- Baby Jo in Going Home (1991)
- D-Day (1992)
- Bumpy's Arcade Fantasy (1992)
- Jim Power in Mutant Planet (1992)
- Tennis Cup 2 (1992)
- Tiny Skweeks (1992)

==== Commodore 64 ====
- Hubert (1983)
- Jeep (1983)
- Bounzy (1983)
- Bob Winner (1986)
- Infernal Runner (1986)
- Magnetik Tank (1986)
- Des Chiffres et des Lettres (1987)
- Downhill Challenge (1987)
- Space Racer (1988)

==== Amiga ====
- Space Racer (1988)
- Skweek (1989)
- Disc (1990)
- Moon Blaster (1990)
- Quadrel (1991)
- Super Skweek (1991)
- Baby Jo in Going Home (1991)
- Tennis Cup 1991 (1991)
- Bumpy's Arcade Fantasy (1992)
- Jim Power in Mutant Planet (1992)
- Tennis Cup 2 (1992)
- Tiny Skweeks (1992)
- Entity (1993)
- The Cartoons (1993)

==== MS-DOS ====
- Orphée: Voyage aux Enfers (1985)
- Top Secret (1985)
- Bob Winner (1986)
- Magnetik Tank (1986)
- Quasar (1986)
- Sapiens (1986)
- Tera: La Cité des Crânes (1986)
- Des chiffres et des lettres (1987)
- Cobra (1987)
- Mach 3 (1987)
- Mission (1987)
- Space Racer (1988)
- Turbo Cup (1988)
- Crazy Shot (1989)
- Sherman M4 (1989)
- Skweek (1989)
- Moon Blaster (1990)
- Panza Kick Boxing (1990)
- Pinball Magic (1990)
- Quadrel (1990)
- Time Race (1990)
- Golden Eagle (1991)
- The Brainies (1991)
- Paragliding (1991)
- Best of the Best: Championship Karate (1992)
- Booly (1991)
- Bumpy's Arcade Fantasy (1992)
- Psyborg (1992)
- D-Day (1992)
- Tennis Cup 2 (1992)
- Entity (1993)
- Jim Power: The Lost Dimension in 3-D (1993)

==== MSX ====
- Maze Max (1985)
- Echec (1985)
- Infernal Miner (1985)
- Loriciels Runner (1986)
- Mach 3 (1987)
- Bumpy (1989)

==== Macintosh ====
- Targhan (1989)

==== Matra Alice ====
- La Chenille Infernale (1984)
- Galaxion (1984)

==== Oric ====
- 3D (1983)
- Carn-3 (1983)
- Caspak (1983)
- Dico 5 (1983)
- Fromage (1983)
- Galaxion (1983)
- Gastronon (1983)
- Gencar (1983)
- Godill'oric (1983)
- Hu*Bert (1983)
- Hyper Master Mind (1983)
- Intertron (1983)
- Jackman (1983)
- La Chenille infernale (1983)
- Le Manoir du Docteur Génius (1983)
- Le Mystère de Kikekankoi (1983)
- Le Protector (1983)
- Moniteur (1983)
- Moniteur V1.0 (1983)
- Moniteur/Ass/Désass (1983)
- Orion (1983)
- Ovni (1983)
- Pengoric (1983)
- Poker (1983)
- Puissance 4 (1983)
- Annuaire (1984)
- Assembleur Symbolique (1984)
- BASIC Francais (1984)
- Budget Familial (1984)
- Calcul Mental (1984)
- Calculus (1984)
- CAO (1984)
- Challenge Voile (1984)
- Citadelle (1984)
- Course aux lettres (1984)
- Crocky (1984)
- Doggy (1984)
- Editeur Musical (1984)
- Flipper (1984)
- Frelon (1984)
- Gestion de Stock (1984)
- Intox et Zoé (1984)
- J'apprends l'Anglais (1984)
- J'apprends la CAO (1984)
- L'Aigle d'or (1984)
- Las Vegas (1984)
- Le Diamant de l'ile maudite (1984)
- Le Général (1984)
- Le Retour du Docteur Génius (1984)
- Lorigraph (1984)
- Lotoriciels (1984)
- Reversi Champion (1984)
- Sorvivor (1984)
- Stanley (1984)
- Super Jeep (1984)
- Tendre Poulet (1984)
- Tic Tac (1984)
- Vision (1984)
- 3D Fongus (1985)
- 3D Munch (1985)
- Jimmy Poubelle (1985)
- Langage Logo V1.0 (1985)
- Le Secret du tombeau (1985)
- Loritel (1985)
- Star (1985)
- Vortex (1985)

==== Philips VG5000 ====
- Citadelle (1984)

==== SG-1000 ====
- Crocky (1984)
- Kamikaze (1984)

==== ZX Spectrum ====
- Course aux Lettres (1984)
- Jeu de Dames (1984)
- Turbo Cup

==== Sinclair ZX81 ====
- Tennis (1984)
- Traffic (1984)

==== Thomson MO5/MO6 ====
- Bob Winner
- Calcul Mental (1984)
- Challenge Voile (1984)
- Coliseum
- Course aux Lettres (1984)
- Eliminator (1984)
- The Fifth Axis
- Intox et Zoé (1984)
- Jeu de Dames (1984)
- K.Y.A.
- L'Aigle d'Or
- Mach 3
- Mon Général
- Monte-Carlo (1984)
- Pulsar II
- Rodeo
- Sapiens
- Space Racer
- Tic Tac (1984)
- Top Chrono
- Vision (1984)
- Yeti (1984)

==== Thomson TO7/TO8 ====
- Bactron
- Bob Winner
- Challenge Voile
- Cobra
- Coliseum
- Course aux Lettres
- Eliminator
- The Fifth Axis
- K.Y.A.
- L'Aigle d'Or
- Mach 3
- Magnetik Tank
- MGT + Bactron
- Mission
- Mon Général
- Pulsar II
- Rodeo
- Sapiens
- Space Racer
- Turbo Cup
- Yeti

=== Nintendo ===
==== Game Boy ====
- Best of the Best: Championship Karate (1992)

==== NES ====
- Best of the Best: Championship Karate (1992)

==== Super NES ====
- Best of the Best: Championship Karate (1992)
- International Tennis Tour (1993)
- Jim Power: The Lost Dimension in 3-D (1993)
- Tommy Moe's Winter Extreme: Skiing & Snowboarding (1994)

=== Sega ===
==== Game Gear ====
- Skweek (1991)

==== Genesis/Mega Drive ====
- Best of the Best: Championship Karate (1992)
- Davis Cup Tennis (1993)
- Jim Power: The Lost Dimension in 3-D (1993)

=== PC Engine ===
==== HuCard ====
- Skweek (1991)

==== CD-ROM² ====
- Builderland: The Story of Melba (1990)
- Baby Jo in: Going Home (1992)
- Jim Power in Mutant Planet (1992)
