= List of video games based on Walt Disney Animation Studios shorts and features =

Below is a list of video games based on Walt Disney Animation Studios shorts and features.

== Animated shorts ==
Following lists are based around various characters from various Disney animated shorts.

=== Mickey Mouse games ===
Mickey Mouse is the figurehead of the Walt Disney Company. Nintendo has acquired many licenses to produce Mickey Mouse, from early Game & Watch titles to the latest home consoles. In these games players play as Mickey Mouse.

Main title / alternate title(s)	Developer	Publisher	Release date	System(s)
Mickey Mouse	Nintendo R&D1	Nintendo	1981	Game & Watch (wide screen)
Mickey & Donald	Nintendo R&D1	Nintendo	1982	Game & Watch (multi-screen)
Sorcerer's Apprentice	Atari, Inc.	Atari	1983	Atari 2600
Mickey in the Great Outdoors	Atari	Atari	1983	Atari 8-bit
Mickey Mouse	Nintendo R&D1	Nintendo	1984	Game & Watch (Panorama)
Mickey's Space Adventure	Sierra On-Line	Sierra On-Line	1984	MS-DOS; Macintosh; Apple II; Commodore 64; VIC-20; TRS-80
Mickey Mousecapade	Hudson Soft	Hudson Soft (Japan); Capcom (US)	1987 (Japan), 1988 (USA)	NES
Mickey Mouse	Gremlin Graphics	Gremlin Graphics	1988	Commodore 64; Amiga; Amstrad CPC; Atari ST; ZX81; ZX Spectrum
Mickey & Minnie's Fun Time Print Kit	Disney Software	Disney Software	1988	MS-DOS
Mickey Mouse	Kemco	Kemco	1989	Game Boy
Castle of Illusion Starring Mickey Mouse	Sega AM7	Sega	1990	Mega Drive/Genesis; Master System; Game Gear; Saturn; PlayStation Network
Mickey's 123: The Big Surprise Party	Distinctive Software	Disney Software; Infogrames (Europe)	1990	Amiga; MS-DOS
Mickey's ABC's: A Day at The Fair	Distinctive Software	Disney Software; Infogrames (Europe)	1990	Amiga; MS-DOS
Mickey Mouse II	Kemco	Kemco (Japan); Nintendo (Europe)	1991	Game Boy (released in Europe and Japan)
Mickey's Jigsaw Puzzles	Novotrade Software	Disney Software	1991	MS-DOS; Amiga
Mickey's Crossword Puzzle Maker	Legacy Software	Disney Software	1991	MS-DOS; Apple II
Fantasia	Infogrames	Sega	1991	Mega Drive/Genesis
Mickey's Colors & Shapes	Sculptured Software	Disney Software	1991	MS-DOS
Mickey's Dangerous Chase	Capcom	Capcom	1991	Game Boy
Mickey Mouse III: Yume Fuusen	Kemco	Kemco	1992	Famicom
Land of Illusion Starring Mickey Mouse	Sega	Sega	1992	Master System; Game Gear
World of Illusion	Sega	Sega	1992	Mega Drive/Genesis
The Magical Quest Starring Mickey Mouse	Capcom	Capcom	1992, 2002 (GBA)	Super NES; Game Boy Advance
Follow the Reader	Disney Software	Disney Software	1993	MS-DOS
Mickey's Safari in Letterland	Beam Software	Hi Tech Expressions	1993	NES
Mickey Mouse IV: Mahou no Labyrinth	Kemco	Kemco	1993	Game Boy
Mickey Mouse: Magic Wands!	Kemco	Kemco	1993	Game Boy
Mickey's Memory Challenge	Designer Software	Disney Software	1993	Amiga; MS-DOS
Mickey's Adventures in Numberland	Beam Software	Hi Tech Expressions	1994	NES
Mickey's Ultimate Challenge	Designer Software	Hi Tech Expressions	1994	Master System; Super NES; Game Boy; Mega Drive/Genesis; Game Gear
Mickey no Tokyo Disneyland Daibōken	Tomy	Tomy	1994	Super Famicom
The Great Circus Mystery Starring Mickey & Minnie	Capcom	Capcom	1994, 2003 (GBA)	Super NES; Mega Drive/Genesis; Game Boy Advance
Mickey Mania	Traveller's Tales	Sony Imagesoft; SCEE (PS1)	1994	Mega Drive/Genesis; Sega CD; Super NES; PlayStation
Tokyo Disneyland: Mickey no Cinderella Shiro Mystery Tour	Tomy	Tomy	1995	Game Boy
Legend of Illusion Starring Mickey Mouse	Sega	Sega	1995	Master System; Game Gear
Disney's Magical Quest 3	Capcom	Capcom	Super Famicom (Japan only); Game Boy Advance	
Mickey & Friends Print Studio	Disney Interactive	Disney Interactive	1995	Windows
Mickey's Racing Adventure	Rare	Nintendo	1999	Game Boy Color
Magical Tetris Challenge	Capcom	Capcom (Japan/US); SCEE (Europe PS1); Activision (Europe N64)	1999	Arcade; Game Boy Color; Nintendo 64; PlayStation
Disney's Mickey Mouse Toddler	Disney Interactive	Disney Interactive	2000	Windows
Mickey's Speedway USA	Rare	Nintendo	2000, 2001 (GBC)	Nintendo 64; Game Boy Color
Disney's Mickey Saves The Day 3D Adventure	Human Code	Disney Interactive	2000	Windows
Minnie & Friends: Yume no Kuni o Sagashite	Hudson Soft	Disney Interactive	2001	Game Boy Color
Disney's Magical Mirror Starring Mickey Mouse	Capcom	Nintendo	2002	GameCube
Disney's Party	Neverland	Hudson Soft/Tomy (Japan); Electronic Arts (US/Europe)	2002	GameCube
Disney's Party	Jupiter	Hudson Soft/Tomy (Japan); Electronic Arts (US/Europe)	2002	Game Boy Advance
Disney's Hide and Sneak	Capcom	Capcom	2003	GameCube
Mickey's Journey To The West	Disney Mobile	Disney Mobile	2007	Mobile phones
Wizards of Mickey	Disney Mobile	Disney Mobile	2008	Mobile phone
Disney Three Kingdoms	Disney Mobile	Disney Mobile	2009	Mobile phone
Puzzle Bobble Disney Edition	Taito		2010	Mobile phone
Epic Mickey	Junction Point Studios	Disney Interactive Studios	2010	Wii
Epic Mickey 2: The Power of Two	Junction Point Studios/Blitz Games	Disney Interactive Studios	2012	Wii; Wii U Windows; Xbox 360; PlayStation 3
Mickey's Typing Adventure	Typing Instructor	Disney	2012	Windows; Macintosh; Steam iOS
Disney Magician Chronicles	Disney Mobile	Disney Mobile	2012 (Japan only)	Android iOS
Epic Mickey: Power of Illusion	Dreamrift	Disney Interactive Studios	2012	Nintendo 3DS
Castle of Illusion Starring Mickey Mouse	Sega Studios Australia	Sega	2013	Windows; Xbox 360; PlayStation Vita; PlayStation 3 Android iPhone
Disney Illusion Island	Dlala Studios	Disney Games	2023	Nintendo Switch
Epic Mickey: Rebrushed	Purple Lamp	THQ Nordic	2024	Nintendo Switch; PlayStation 4 Windows; Xbox One; PlayStation 5 Xbox Series X/S

=== Donald Duck games ===
The following games are based around Donald Duck properties.

Main title / alternate title(s)	Developer	Release date	System(s)
Donald Duck's Speedboat (cancelled, prototype)	Atari	1979	Atari 2600
Donald Duck's Playground	Sierra On-Line	1984 (C64), 1986, 1988 (IBM PCjr)	Amiga; Atari ST; Apple II; Commodore 64; IBM PCjr
Donald Duck	Kemco	1988	Famicom
Donald's Alphabet Chase	Westwood Associates	1988	MS-DOS; Amiga; Amstrad CPC; Apple II; Commodore 64; ZX Spectrum
Donald the Hero	CP Verlag/Magic Disk 64	1988	Commodore 64
Lucky Dime Caper	Sega of Japan	1991	Master System; Game Gear
QuackShot	Sega of Japan	1991	Mega Drive/Genesis; Saturn
Deep Duck Trouble Starring Donald Duck	Sega of Japan	1993	Master System; Game Gear
Donald Duck no Mahō no Bōshi (ドナルドダックの魔法のぼうし, Donald Duck's Magic Hat)	Epoch	1995	Super Famicom
Donald in Maui Mallard Maui Mallard in Cold Shadow^{NA}	Eurocom	1996	Windows; Super NES; Mega Drive/Genesis; Game Boy
Donald Duck: Goin' Quackers	Ubisoft	2000	PlayStation; PlayStation 2 Nintendo 64; GameCube; Windows; Dreamcast
Donald Duck: Goin' Quackers	Ubisoft	2000	Game Boy Color; Game Boy Advance
Fishing Pico - Donald no Adventure	Sega Toys	2000	Sega Pico
PK: Out of the Shadows	Ubisoft Montreal	2002	PlayStation 2 GameCube
Duckburg P.D.: Donald on Duty	Disney Mobile Studios	2007	Mobile phones
Donald Duck Truck Tour	Disney Mobile Studios	2007	Mobile phones
Donald Duck Quest	Disney Mobile Studios	2007	Mobile phones
Donald Duck Quest Deluxe	Disney Mobile Studios	2007	Mobile phones
PK: Phantom Duck	Disney Mobile Studios	2008	Mobile phones
Donarudo no aisukurīmu-ya ya-san (ドナルドのアイスクリーム屋やさん)	The Walt Disney Company	2010	Web Browser (Japan only)
Okashi kashi o kurenaki ~yaitazurasuruzo~o! (お菓子かしをくれなきゃいたずらするぞぉ！)	The Walt Disney Company	2010	Web Browser (Japan only)
Jairo no sono Gia totte! (ジャイロのそのギアとって！)	The Walt Disney Company	2010	Web Browser (Japan only)

=== Goofy games ===
The following games are based around the character Goofy.

Main title / Alternate title(s)	Developer	Release date	System(s)
Matterhorn Screamer	Hi Tech Expressions	1988	MS-DOS; Apple II; Commodore 64
Goofy's Railway Express	Westwood Associates, Walt Disney Computer Software	1990	Amiga; Atari ST; MS-DOS; Commodore 64
Goofy's Hysterical History Tour	Imagineering	1993	Mega Drive/Genesis
Goofy's Fun House	The Code Monkeys	2001	PlayStation
Extremely Goofy Skating	Walt Disney Internet Group	2003	Mobile phone
Extremely Goofy Cycling	Walt Disney Internet Group	2003	Mobile phone

=== Rhythm games ===
Main title / alternate title(s)	Developer	Release date	System(s)
Tokyo Disneyland: Fantasy Tour	Tose / Tomy	1998	Game Boy
Dance Dance Revolution Disney Mix	Konami	2000	PlayStation arcade
Dance Dance Revolution Disney Dancing Museum	Konami	2000	Nintendo 64
Pop'n Music Mickey Tunes	Konami	2000	Arcade; PlayStation
Pop'n Music GB Disney Tunes	Konami	2000	Game Boy Color
Dance Dance Revolution Disney Grooves	Konami	2009	Wii
Fantasia: Music Evolved	Harmonix	2014	Xbox 360; Xbox One

=== Sports games ===
Main title / alternate title(s)	Developer	Release date	System (s)
Disney Golf	T&E SOFT Inc.	2002	PlayStation 2
Disney Sports Soccer	Konami	2002	GameCube
Disney Sports Soccer	Konami	2002	Game Boy Advance
Disney Sports Skateboarding	Konami	2002	GameCube
Disney Sports Skateboarding	Konami	2002	Game Boy Advance
Disney Sports Basketball	Konami	2002	GameCube
Disney Sports Basketball	Konami	2002	Game Boy Advance
Disney Sports Football	Konami	2002	GameCube
Disney Sports Football	Konami	2002	Game Boy Advance
Disney Sports Snowboarding	Konami	2003	Game Boy Advance
Disney Sports Motocross	Konami	2003	Game Boy Advance
Disney Winter Fun	Disney Mobile Studios	2006	Mobile phone
Disney Snow Sports	Disney Mobile Studios	2007	Mobile phone
Disney Magicboard Online	The Walt Disney Company	2007	Windows

== Disney animated feature films games ==
The following list consists of games based on List of Walt Disney Animation Studios films and related propeties.

=== Snow White ===
Main title / alternate title(s)	Developer(s)	Release date	System(s)
Snow White and the Seven Dwarfs	Planet Interactive	2001	Game Boy Color
Seven Dwarfs: The Queen's Return	Disney Mobile	2013	iOS

=== Pinocchio ===
Main title / alternate title(s)	Developer(s)	Release date	System(s)
Pinocchio	Virgin Interactive	1996	Super NES; Mega Drive/Genesis; Game Boy

=== Cinderella ===
Main title / alternate title(s)	Developer(s)	Release date	System(s)
Cinderella: Magical Dreams	DC Studios	2005	Game Boy Advance

=== Alice in Wonderland ===
Main title / alternate title(s)	Developer(s)	Release date	System(s)
Alice no Paint Adventure	Epoch	1995	Super Famicom
Alice in Wonderland	Digital Eclipse	2000	Game Boy Color

=== Peter Pan ===
Main title / alternate title(s)	Developer(s)	Release date	System(s)
Peter Pan: Adventures in Never Land	Doki Denki, Crawfish Interactive	2002	PlayStation, Windows; Game Boy Advance
Peter Pan Pair Up	Walt Disney Internet Group	2003	Mobile phone
Captain Hook's Rocks and Crocs	Walt Disney Internet Group	2003	Mobile phone

=== Dalmatians ===
Main title / alternate title(s)	Developer(s)	Release date	System(s)
101 Dalmatians: Escape from DeVil Manor (Note: The following games are based around the 1996 film of the same name and its 2000 sequel, 102 Dalmatians, although the games utilize the imagery from the 1961 animated film One Hundred and One Dalmatians).	DreamForge Intertainment	1997	Windows
102 Dalmatians: Puppies to the Rescue (Note: The following games are based around the 1996 film of the same name and its 2000 sequel, 102 Dalmatians, although the games utilize the imagery from the 1961 animated film One Hundred and One Dalmatians).	Toys for Bob	2000	Sega Dreamcast; PlayStation; Windows
102 Dalmatians: Puppies to the Rescue (Note: The following games are based around the 1996 film of the same name and its 2000 sequel, 102 Dalmatians, although the games utilize the imagery from the 1961 animated film One Hundred and One Dalmatians).	Digital Eclipse	2000	Game Boy Color
101 Dalmatians II: Patch's London Adventure	Digital Eclipse	2003	PlayStation

=== Jungle Book ===
Main title / alternate title(s)	Developer(s)	Release date	System(s)
The Jungle Book	Coktel Vision	1988	Amiga; Atari ST; Amstrad CPC
The Jungle Book	Virgin Interactive	1993	Mega Drive/Genesis; Master System; MS-DOS; Game Boy; NES; Super NES; Game Gear
The Jungle Book Groove Party	Ubisoft Montreal; Ubisoft Shanghai	2000	PlayStation; PlayStation 2 Windows
The Jungle Book	Ubisoft	2003	Game Boy Advance
Mowgli in Jungle Book	Disney Mobile	2010	Mobile phone

=== The Many Adventures of Winnie the Pooh ===
Main title / alternate title(s)	Developer	Release date	System(s)
Winnie the Pooh in the Hundred Acre Wood	Sierra On-Line	1984	Amiga; Apple II; Atari ST; Commodore 64; MS-DOS
A Year at Pooh Corner	Novotrade	1994	Sega Pico
Ready for Math with Pooh	Disney Interactive Studios	1997	Windows
Ready to Read with Pooh	Disney Interactive Studios	1997	Windows
Tigger's Honey Hunt	Doki Denki	2000	PlayStation; Windows; Nintendo 64
Winnie the Pooh: Adventures in the 100 Acre Wood	Tose	2000	Game Boy Color
Disney's Winnie the Pooh: Preschool	Hi Corp, Atlus	2001	PlayStation
Disney's Pooh's Party Game: In Search of the Treasure (Party Time with Winnie the Pooh in Europe)	Doki Denki	2001	PlayStation; Windows
Kuma no Pooh-San: Mori no Nakamato 123	Atlus	2001	PlayStation
Pooh and Tigger's Hunny Safari	Digital Eclipse	2001	Game Boy Color
Piglet's Big Game	Doki Denki Studio	2003	GameCube; PlayStation 2
Piglet's Big Game	Doki Denki Studio	2003	Game Boy Advance
Pooh's Hunny Pot Challenge	Walt Disney Internet Group	2003	Mobile phone
Pooh's Pairs	Walt Disney Internet Group	2003	Mobile phone
Tigger's Bouncin' Time	Walt Disney Internet Group	2003	Mobile phone
Pooh's Hunny Blocks	Walt Disney Internet Group	2003	Mobile phone
Winnie the Pooh's Rumbly Tumbly Adventure	Phoenix Games Studio	2005	GameCube; PlayStation 2
Winnie the Pooh's Rumbly Tumbly Adventure	Phoenix Games Studio	2005	Game Boy Advance
Kuma no Pooh-San: 100 Acre no Mori no Cooking Book	Disney Interactive Studios	2011	Nintendo DS
Disney's Winnie the Pooh and the Honey Tree Animated Storybook	Disney Interactive Studios	2014	Windows

=== The Black Cauldron ===
Main title / alternate title(s)	Developer(s)	Release date	System(s)
The Black Cauldron	Sierra On-Line	1986	Apple II; Atari ST; Amiga; MS-DOS

=== The Great Mouse Detective ===
Main title / alternate title(s)	Developer(s)	Release date	System(s)
Basil the Great Mouse Detective	Gremlin Graphics	1987	Amstrad CPC; Atari 8-bit Commodore 64; ZX Spectrum

=== Oliver & Company ===
Main title / alternate title(s)	Developer(s)	Release date	System(s)
Oliver & Company	Coktel Vision	1989	Amiga; Atari ST; DOS

=== The Little Mermaid ===
Main title / alternate title(s)	Developer(s)	Release date	System(s)
The Little Mermaid	Capcom	1991	NES; Game Boy
Ariel the Little Mermaid	BlueSky Software	1992	Mega Drive/Genesis; Game Gear; Master System
The Little Mermaid II	Blitz Games	2000	PlayStation
The Little Mermaid II: Pinball Frenzy	Left Field Productions	2000	Game Boy Color
The Little Mermaid: Magic in Two Kingdoms	Gorilla Systems Corporation	2006	Game Boy Advance
The Little Mermaid: Ariel's Undersea Adventure	Gorilla Systems Corporation	2006	Nintendo DS

=== Beauty and the Beast ===
Main title / alternate title(s)	Developer(s)	Release date	System(s)
Beauty and the Beast: Belle's Quest	Software Creations	1993	Mega Drive/Genesis
Beauty and the Beast: Roar of the Beast	Software Creations	1993	Mega Drive/Genesis
Beauty and the Beast	Probe Software	1994	NES
Beauty and the Beast	Probe Entertainment	1994	Super NES
Belle's Magic Mirror	Walt Disney Internet Group	2003	Mobile phone

=== Aladdin ===
Main title / alternate title(s)	Developer(s)	Release date	System(s)
Aladdin	Virgin Interactive	1993	Mega Drive/Genesis; MS-DOS; Amiga; Game Boy; Game Boy Color; NES
Aladdin	Capcom	1993	Super NES; Game Boy Advance
Aladdin	SIMS	1994	Game Gear; Master System
Aladdin: The New Adventure	Disney Mobile	2010	Mobile phone

=== The Lion King ===
Main title / alternate title(s)	Developer(s)	Release date	System(s)
The Lion King	Virgin Interactive	1994	Mega Drive/Genesis; Super NES; MS-DOS; Windows; NES; Game Boy; Amiga; Game Gear; Master System
Timon & Pumbaa's Jungle Games	7th Level, Tiertex	1995	Windows; Super NES
The Lion King II: Simba's Pride	Disney Interactive Victoria	1998	Windows
The Lion King: Simba's Mighty Adventure	Paradox Development	2000	PlayStation
The Lion King: Simba's Mighty Adventure	Torus Games	2000	Game Boy Color
The Lion King 1½	Vicarious Visions	2003	Game Boy Advance

=== Pochahontas ===
Main title / alternate title(s)	Developer(s)	Release date	System(s)
Pocahontas	Funcom, Tiertex	1996	Mega Drive/Genesis; Game Boy

=== The Hunchback of Notre Dame ===
Main title / alternate title(s)	Developer(s)	Release date	System(s)
The Hunchback of Notre Dame: Topsy Turvy Games	7th Level, Tiertex	1996	Windows; Game Boy

=== Hercules ===
Main title / alternate title(s)	Developer(s)	Release date	System(s)
Hercules	Eurocom	1997	PlayStation; Windows
Hercules	Tiertex Design Studios	1997	Game Boy

=== Mulan ===
Main title / alternate title(s)	Developer(s)	Release date	System(s)
Mulan	Tiertex	1998	Game Boy

=== Tarzan ===
Main title / alternate title(s)	Developer(s)	Release date	System(s)
Tarzan	Eurocom	1999	Windows; PlayStation; Nintendo 64
Tarzan	Digital Eclipse	1999	Game Boy Color
Tarzan: Untamed	Ubisoft Montreal	2001	PlayStation 2 GameCube

=== Dinosaur ===
Main title / alternate title(s)	Developer(s)	Release date	System(s)
Dinosaur	Digital Eclipse, Sandbox Studios, Ubi Soft Paris, Ubi Soft Montreal	2000	PlayStation; Sega Dreamcast; PlayStation 2 Windows; Game Boy Color

=== The Emperor's New Groove ===
Main title / alternate title(s)	Developer(s)	Release date	System(s)
The Emperor's New Groove	Argonaut Games	2000	Windows; PlayStation
The Emperor's New Groove	Sandbox Studios	2000	Game Boy Color

=== Atlantis: The Lost Empire ===
Main title / alternate title(s)	Developer(s)	Release date	System(s)
Atlantis: The Lost Empire – Search for the Journal	Zombie Studios	2001	Windows
Atlantis: The Lost Empire – Trial by Fire	Zombie Studios	2001	Windows
Atlantis: The Lost Empire	Eurocom	2001	PlayStation
Atlantis: The Lost Empire	3d6 Games	2001	Game Boy Color
Atlantis: The Lost Empire	Eurocom	2001	Game Boy Advance

=== Lilo & Stitch ===
Main title / alternate title(s)	Developer(s)	Release date	System(s)
Lilo & Stitch	Digital Eclipse	2002	Game Boy Advance
Lilo & Stitch: Trouble in Paradise	Blitz Games	2002	PlayStation; Windows
Stitch: Experiment 626	High Voltage Software	2002	PlayStation 2
Lilo & Stitch: Hawaiian Adventure	Gorilla Systems Corporation	2002	Windows; Mac OS
Lilo & Stitch Pinball	Buzz Monkey Software	2002	Windows
Lilo & Stitch: Space Escape	Walt Disney Internet Group	2003	Mobile phone
Lilo & Stitch	Disney Mobile	2009	Mobile phone (Japan only)
Bomberman: Disney Stitch Edition	Hudson Soft	2010	Mobile phone (Japan only)

=== Treasure Planet ===
Main title / alternate title(s)	Developer(s)	Release date	System(s)
Treasure Planet	Magenta Software	2002	PlayStation
Treasure Planet	Bizarre Creations	2002	PlayStation 2 Game Boy Advance
Treasure Planet: Battle at Procyon	Barking Dog Studios	2002	Windows

=== Brother Bear ===
Main title / alternate title(s)	Developer(s)	Release date	System(s)
Brother Bear	KnowWonder, Vicarious Visions	2003	Windows; Game Boy Advance; Mobile phone

=== Home on the Range ===
Main title / alternate title(s)	Developer(s)	Release date	System(s)
Home on the Range: It's Hero Time!	Artificial Mind & Movement	2004	Game Boy Advance

=== Chicken Little ===
Main title / alternate title(s)	Developer(s)	Release date	System(s)
Chicken Little	Avalanche Software	2005	GameCube, Windows, PlayStation 2, Xbox
Chicken Little	Artificial Mind and Movement	2005	Game Boy Advance

=== Meet the Robinsons ===
Main title / alternate title(s)	Developer(s)	Release date	System(s)
Meet the Robinsons	Avalanche Software	2007	Wii, PlayStation 2, Xbox, GameCube, Windows
Meet the Robinsons	Climax Studios	2007	Game Boy Advance
Meet the Robinsons	Altron	2007	Nintendo DS

=== The Princess and the Frog ===
Main title / alternate title(s)	Developer(s)	Release date	System(s)
The Princess and the Frog	Griptonite Games	2009	Wii; Windows; Nintendo DS

=== Tangled ===
Main title / alternate title(s)	Developer(s)	Release date	System(s)
Tangled	Planet Moon Studios	2010	Wii; Windows; Nintendo DS

=== Wreck-It Ralph ===
Main title / alternate title(s)	Developer(s)	Release date	System(s)
Wreck-It Ralph	Pipeworks Software	2012	Wii; Nintendo DS; Nintendo 3DS

=== Frozen ===
Main title / alternate title(s)	Developer(s)	Release date	System(s)
Frozen: Olaf's Quest	1st Playable Productions	2013	Nintendo DS; Nintendo 3DS

=== Big Hero 6 ===
Main title / alternate title(s)	Developer(s)	Release date	System(s)
Big Hero 6: Battle in the Bay	1st Playable Productions	2015	Nintendo DS; Nintendo 3DS

=== Zootopia ===
Main title / alternate title(s)	Developer(s)	Release date	System(s)
Zootopia: Crime Files	Hibernum Créations	2016	iOS; Android

=== Disney Princesses & Villains ===
Main title / alternate title(s)	Developer(s)	Release date	System(s)
Disney's Villains' Revenge	Disney Interactive Studios	1999	Windows; Macintosh
Disney Princess	Art Co., Ltd	2003	Game Boy Advance
Disney Princess: Royal Adventure	Human Soft	2006	Game Boy Advance
Disney Princess: Enchanted Journey	Papaya Studio	2007	Wii; PlayStation 2 Windows
Disney Princess: Magical Jewels	1st Playable Productions	2007	Nintendo DS
Disney Princess: Enchanting Storybooks	Page 44 Studios	2011	Wii; Nintendo DS
Disney Princess: My Fairytale Adventure	High Impact Games	2012	Wii; Nintendo 3DS; Windows; Macintosh
