= List of Mickey Mouse universe media =

This is a list of media associated with the Mickey Mouse universe, a fictional shared universe which is the setting for stories involving Disney cartoon characters Mickey and Minnie Mouse, Pluto, Goofy, Donald and Daisy Duck, and many other characters. The universe originated from the Mickey Mouse animated short films produced by Disney starting in 1928.

== Shorts ==
=== Theatrical ===
Title	Run	Total # shorts	Notes
Mickey Mouse	1928–53, 1983, 1990, 1995, 2013	130	128 shorts if not counting Don Donald and Modern Inventions, which were reissued as Donald Duck shorts after their initial release
Donald Duck	1937–1956, 1959, 1961, 2000	121	
Pluto	1937, 1940–51	43	Released as Pluto the Pup in its first short
Donald & Goofy	1938, 1940, 1945–47	6	Released as Donald and Goofy in its first two shorts. Generally grouped with the Donald Duck shorts on Home Video Media re-releases.
Goofy	1939–53, 1961, 2007	46	
Figaro	1943, 1946-1947	3	
Chip 'n' Dale	1951–52, 1954	3	

== Films ==
=== Theatrical films ===
Release date	Title
November 13, 1940	Fantasia (Note: Anthology film – The Sorcerer's Apprentice segment.)
June 19, 1941	The Reluctant Dragon (Note: Anthology film – Old MacDonald and How to Ride a Horse segments.)
February 6, 1943	Saludos Amigos (Note: Anthology film – Lake Titicaca, El Gaucho Goofy, and Aquarela do Brasil segments.)
February 3, 1941	The Three Caballeros (Note: Anthology filmA Present for Donald Duck, Baia and La Pinata segments.)
September 27, 1947	Fun and Fancy Free (Note: Anthology film – Mickey and the Beanstalk segment.)
May 27, 1948	Melody Time (Note: Anthology film – Blame It on the Samba segment.)
August 3, 1990	DuckTales the Movie: Treasure of the Lost Lamp
April 7, 1995	A Goofy Movie
January 1, 1999	Fantasia 2000 (Note: Anthology film – The Sorcerer's Apprentice and Pomp and Circumstance segments.)
August 17, 2004	Mickey, Donald, Goofy: The Three Musketeers (Note: Limited theatrical release.)

=== Direct-to video films ===
Release date	Title
November 9, 1999	Mickey's Once Upon a Christmas (Note: Anthology film.)
February 29, 2000	An Extremely Goofy Movie
November 6, 2001	Mickey's Magical Christmas: Snowed in at the House of Mouse
September 3, 2002	Mickey's House of Villains
November 9, 2004	Mickey's Twice Upon a Christmas

=== Streaming films ===
Release date	Title
May 20, 2022	Chip 'n Dale: Rescue Rangers
November 18, 2022	Mickey: The Story of a Mouse

== Television series ==
=== Original shows ===
Title	Broadcast run	Original channel	Total # seasons	Total # episodes	Production company	Notes
DuckTales	1987–90	Broadcast syndication	4	100	Walt Disney Television Animation	Based on Uncle Scrooge by Carl Barks
Chip 'n Dale: Rescue Rangers	1989–90	Disney Channel (1989); Syndication (1989–90)	3	65	Walt Disney Television Animation	
Darkwing Duck	1991–92	Disney Channel (1991); Syndication (1991–1995); ABC (1991–1993)	3	91	Walt Disney Television Animation	
Goof Troop	1992	The Disney Channel (1992); Syndication (season 1); ABC (season 2)	2	78	Walt Disney Television Animation	
Quack Pack	1996	Syndication	1	39	Walt Disney Television Animation	
Mickey Mouse Works	1999–2000	ABC	2	25	Walt Disney Television Animation	
House of Mouse	2001–03	ABC (2001–02), Toon Disney (2002–03)	3	52	Walt Disney Television Animation	Featuring characters from Walt Disney Animation Studios films
Mickey Mouse Clubhouse	2006–16	Playhouse Disney (2006–2011), Disney Jr. (2011–16)	4	125	Walt Disney Television Animation	
Mickey Mouse	2013–19	Disney Channel	5	96	Disney Television Animation	Continued as The Wonderful World of Mickey Mouse
Mickey Mouse Mixed-Up Adventures	2017–21	Disney Jr.	3	87	Disney Television Animation	
DuckTales	2017–21	Disney XD (2017, 2020–21), Disney Channel (2018–19)	3	69	Disney Television Animation	A reboot of the 1987 series
Legend of the Three Caballeros	2018	DisneyLife	1	13		Based on the 1945 film The Three Caballeros
The Wonderful World of Mickey Mouse	2020–2023	Disney+	2	24	Disney Television Animation	Continuation of Mickey Mouse
Mickey Mouse Funhouse	2021–2025	Disney Jr.	3	86	Disney Television Animation	
Chip 'n' Dale: Park Life	2021–2024	Disney+	2	30	Xilam	
How to Stay at Home	2021	Disney+	1	3	Walt Disney Animation Studios	
Mickey Mouse Clubhouse+	2025-present	Disney Jr./Disney+	1	28	Disney Television Animation	A reboot of Mickey Mouse Clubhouse
Darkwing Duck	TBA	Disney+				a reboot of the 1991 series
Oswald the Lucky Rabbit	TBA	Disney+				a live action animated series

=== Package shows ===
Series no.	Title	Broadcast run	Original channel
1	Good Morning, Mickey!	1983–1992	Disney Channel
2	Mickey's Mouse Tracks	1992–1995	Disney Channel
3	Have a Laugh!	2009–2012	Disney Channel

=== Television specials ===
#	Title	Release date
1	Sport Goofy in Soccermania	May 27, 1987
2	Totally Minnie	February 25, 1988
3	Duck the Halls: A Mickey Mouse Christmas Special	December 6, 2016
4	The Scariest Story Ever: A Mickey Mouse Halloween Spooktacular!	October 8, 2017
5	Mickey's Tale of Two Witches	October 7, 2021
6	Mickey and Minnie Wish Upon a Christmas	December 2, 2021
7	Mickey Saves Christmas	November 27, 2022
8	The Wonderful World of Mickey Mouse: Steamboat Silly	July 28, 2023
9	Mickey and Friends Trick or Treats	October 1, 2023
10	Mickey and the Very Many Christmases	December 1, 2024

== Video games ==
=== Mickey Mouse games ===
Main title / alternate title(s)	Developer	Publisher	Release date	System(s)
Mickey Mouse	Nintendo R&D1	Nintendo	1981	Game & Watch (wide screen)
Mickey & Donald	Nintendo R&D1	Nintendo	1982	Game & Watch (multi-screen)
Sorcerer's Apprentice	Atari	Atari	1983	Atari 2600
Mickey in the Great Outdoors	Atari	Atari	1983	Atari 8-bit
Mickey Mouse	Nintendo R&D1	Atari	1984	Game & Watch (Panorama)
Mickey's Space Adventure	Sierra On-Line	Sierra On-Line	1984	DOS; Apple Macintosh; Apple II; Commodore 64/VIC; TRS-80
Mickey Mousecapade	Hudson Soft	Hudson Soft (Japan); Capcom (US)	1987 (Japan), 1988 (USA)	NES
Mickey Mouse	Gremlin Graphics	Gremlin Graphics	1988	Commodore 64; Amiga; Amstrad CPC; Atari ST; Sinclair ZX81/Spectrum
Mickey & Minnie's Fun Time Print Kit	Disney Software	Disney Software	1988	DOS
Mickey Mouse Orange Express	Tomy	Tomy	Unknown	Handheld LCD
Mickey Mouse Jungle Daiboken	Tomy	Tomy	Unknown	Handheld LCD
Mickey Mouse Mahou no Yakata	Epoch	Epoch	1989	Handheld LCD
Mickey Mouse	Kemco	Kemco	1989	Game Boy
Mickey Mouse wa Shouboushi	Epoch	Epoch	1990	Handheld LCD
Castle of Illusion Starring Mickey Mouse	Sega AM7	Sega	1990	Sega Mega Drive/Genesis; Master System; Game Gear; Sega Saturn; PlayStation Network
Mickey's 123: The Big Surprise Party	Distinctive Software	Disney Software; Infogrames (Europe)	1990	Amiga; DOS
Mickey's ABC's: A Day at The Fair	Distinctive Software	Disney Software; Infogrames (Europe)	1990	Amiga; DOS
Mickey Mouse II	Kemco	Kemco (Japan); Nintendo (Europe)	1991	Game Boy (released in Europe and Japan)
Mickey's Jigsaw Puzzles	Novotrade Software	Disney Software	1991	DOS; Amiga
Mickey's Crossword Puzzle Maker	Legacy Software	Disney Software	1991	DOS; Apple II
Fantasia	Infogrames	Sega	1991	Sega Mega Drive/Genesis
Mickey's Colors & Shapes	Sculptured Software	Disney Software	1991	DOS
Mickey's Dangerous Chase	Capcom	Capcom	1991	Game Boy
Mickey & Friends	Tiger Electronics	Tiger Electronics	1991	Handheld LCD
Mickey Mouse III: Yume Fuusen	Kemco	Kemco	1992	NES
Land of Illusion starring Mickey Mouse	Sega	Sega	1992	Master System; Game Gear
World of Illusion Starring Mickey Mouse and Donald Duck	Sega	Sega	1992	Sega Mega Drive/Genesis
Disney's Magical Quest The Magical Quest Starring Mickey Mouse	Capcom	Capcom	1992, 2002 (GBA)	SNES; Game Boy Advance
Follow the Reader	Disney Software	Disney Software	1993	DOS
Mickey no Yukai na Bouken	Novotrade	Sega of Japan	1993	Sega Pico
The Perils of Mickey	Tiger Electronics	Tiger Electronics	1993	Handheld LCD
Mickey's Safari in Letterland	Beam Software	Hi Tech Expressions	1993	NES
Mickey Mouse IV: Mahou no Labyrinth ,	Kemco	Kemco	1993	Game Boy
Mickey Mouse: Magic Wands!	Kemco	Kemco	1993	Game Boy
Mickey's Memory Challenge	Designer Software	Disney Software	1993	Amiga; DOS
Mickey's Adventures in Numberland	Beam Software	Hi Tech Expressions	1994	NES
Mickey's Ultimate Challenge	Designer Software	Hi Tech Expressions	1994	Master System; SNES; Game Boy; Sega Mega Drive/Genesis; Game Gear
Mickey's Playtown Adventure - A Day of Discovery! (cancelled)	Hi Tech Expressions	Hi Tech Expressions		SNES
Disney's Magical Quest 2 The Great Circus Mystery Starring Mickey & Minnie	Capcom	Capcom	1994, 2003 (GBA)	SNES; Sega Mega Drive/Genesis; Game Boy Advance
Mickey Mania	Traveller's Tales	Sony Imagesoft; SCEE (PS1)	1994	Sega Mega Drive/Genesis; Sega CD; SNES; PlayStation
Mickey Mouse's Blast Into the Past	Sega	Sega	1994	Sega Pico
Legend of Illusion Starring Mickey Mouse	Sega	Sega	1995	Master System; Game Gear
Disney's Magical Quest 3 Mickey to Donald - Magical Adventure 3^{JP}	Capcom	Capcom	1995, 2004 (GBA)	SNES (Japan only); Game Boy Advance
Mickey & Friends Print Studio	Disney Interactive	Disney Interactive	1995	Windows
Mickey no Tokyo Disneyland Stamp Rally	Sega Toys	Sega Toys	1996	Sega Pico (Japan only)
Mickey's Racing Adventure	Rare	Nintendo	1999	Game Boy Color
Magical Tetris Challenge	Capcom	Capcom (Japan/US); SCEE (Europe PS1); Activision (Europe N64)	1999	Arcade; Game Boy Color; Nintendo 64; PlayStation
Tokyo Disneyland Toon Town Mickey no Boku wa Untenshu	Sega Toys	Sega Toys	1999	Sega Pico (Japan only)
Disney's Mickey Mouse Toddler	Disney Interactive	Disney Interactive	2000	Windows
Disney's Mickey Saves The Day 3D Adventure	Human Code	Disney Interactive	2000	Windows
Mickey's Speedway USA	Rare	Nintendo	2000, 2001 (GBC)	Nintendo 64; Game Boy Color
Disney's Magical Mirror Starring Mickey Mouse	Capcom	Nintendo	2002	GameCube
Disney's Party	Neverland (GameCube); Jupiter (GBA)	Hudson Soft/Tomy (Japan); Electronic Arts (US/Europe)	2002	GameCube; Game Boy Advance
Tokyo Disney Sea Mickey to Asobou!	Sega Toys	Sega Toys	2002	Sega Pico (Japan only)
Disney's Hide and Sneak	Capcom	Capcom	2003	GameCube
Mickey's Journey To The West	Disney Mobile Studios	Disney Mobile Studios	2007	Mobile phones
Wizards of Mickey	Disney Mobile Studios	Disney Mobile Studios	2008	Mobile phone
Disney Three Kingdoms	Disney Mobile Studios	Disney Mobile Studios	2009	Mobile phone
Epic Mickey. The game was announced in October 2009,	Junction Point Studios	Disney Interactive Studios	2010	Wii
Epic Mickey 2: The Power of Two .	Junction Point Studios/Blitz Games	Disney Interactive Studios	2012	Wii; Wii U Windows; Xbox 360; PlayStation 3
Mickey's Typing Adventure	Typing Instructor	Disney	2012	Windows; Macintosh; Steam iOS
Disney Magician Chronicles	Disney Mobile	Disney Mobile	2012 (Japan only)	Android iOS
Epic Mickey: Power of Illusion	Dreamrift	Disney Interactive Studios	2012	Nintendo 3DS
Castle of Illusion Starring Mickey Mouse	Sega Studios Australia	Sega	2013	Windows; Xbox 360; PlayStation Vita; PlayStation 3 Android iPhone

=== Donald Duck games ===
The following games are based around Donald Duck properties.

Main title / alternate title(s)	Developer	Release date	System(s)
Donald Duck's Speedboat (cancelled, prototype)	Atari		Atari 2600
Onc' Picsou	Tiger Electronics (Orlitronic)	1984	Handheld LCD
Donald Duck's Playground	Sierra On-Line	1984 (C64), 1986, 1988 (IBM PCjr)	Amiga; Atari ST; Apple II; Commodore 64; IBM PCjr
Donald Duck	Kemco	1988	Famicom
Donald's Alphabet Chase	Westwood Associates	1988	DOS; Amiga; Amstrad CPC; Apple II; Commodore 64; ZX Spectrum
Donald the Hero	CP Verlag/Magic Disk 64	1988	Commodore 64
Donald & Goofy	Epoch	1990	Handheld LCD
Lucky Dime Caper	Sega of Japan	1991	Master System; Game Gear
Quackshot	Sega of Japan	1991	Sega Mega Drive/Genesis; Sega Saturn
Deep Duck Trouble Starring Donald Duck	Sega of Japan	1993	Master System; Game Gear
Donald no Obake Taiji	Sega of Japan	1993	Sega Pico
Donald Duck no Mahō no Bōshi (ドナルドダックの魔法のぼうし, Donald Duck's Magic Hat)	Epoch	1995	SNES
Donald no TV Show	Sega of Japan	1995	Sega Pico
Donald in Maui Mallard Maui Mallard in Cold Shadow^{NA}	Eurocom	1996	Windows; SNES; Sega Mega Drive/Genesis; Game Boy
Donald Duck: Goin' Quackers	Ubi Soft	2000	PlayStation; PlayStation 2 Nintendo 64; Game Boy Color; GameCube; Windows; Dreamcast
Fishing Pico - Donald no Adventure	Sega Toys	2000	Sega Pico
Disney's PK: Out of the Shadows	Ubi Soft Montreal	2002	PlayStation 2 GameCube
Duckburg P.D.: Donald on Duty	Disney Mobile Studios	2007	Mobile phones
Donald Duck Truck Tour	Disney Mobile Studios	2007	Mobile phones
Donald Duck Quest	Disney Mobile Studios	2007	Mobile phones
Donald Duck Quest Deluxe	Disney Mobile Studios	2007	Mobile phones
PK: Phantom Duck	Disney Mobile Studios	2008	Mobile phones
Donarudo no aisukurīmu-ya ya-san (ドナルドのアイスクリーム屋やさん)	The Walt Disney Company	2010	Web Browser (Japan only)
Okashi kashi o kurenaki ~yaitazurasuruzo~o! (お菓子かしをくれなきゃいたずらするぞぉ！)	The Walt Disney Company	2010	Web Browser (Japan only)
Jairo no sono Gia totte! (ジャイロのそのギアとって！)	The Walt Disney Company	2010	Web Browser (Japan only)

=== Goofy games ===
The following games are based around the character Goofy.

Main title / Alternate title(s)	Developer	Release date	System(s)
Matterhorn Screamer	Hi Tech Expressions	1988	DOS; Apple II; Commodore 64
Goofy Ski	Tiger Electronics	1990	Handheld LCD
Donald & Goofy	Epoch	1990	Handheld LCD
Goofy's Railway Express	Westwood Associates, Walt Disney Computer Software	1990	Amiga; Atari ST; DOS; Commodore 64
Goofy's Hysterical History Tour	Imagineering	1993	Sega Mega Drive/Genesis
Goofy's Fun House	The Code Monkeys	2001	PlayStation
Disney's Extremely Goofy Skateboarding	Krome Studios	2001	Windows
Extremely Goofy Skating	Walt Disney Internet Group	2003	Mobile phone
Extremely Goofy Cycling	Walt Disney Internet Group	2003	Mobile phone

=== Rhythm games ===
Main title / alternate title(s)	Developer	Release date	System(s)
Dance Dance Revolution Disney Mix	Konami	2000	PlayStation arcade
Dance Dance Revolution Disney Dancing Museum	Konami	2000	Nintendo 64
Pop'n Music Mickey Tunes	Konami	2000	Arcade; PlayStation; Game Boy Color
Dance Dance Revolution (Game Boy Color)	Konami	2001	Game Boy Color
Dance Dance Revolution Disney Mix	Konami	2006	TV game
Dance Dance Revolution Disney Grooves	Konami	2009	Wii
Just Dance: Disney Party	Ubisoft	2012	Wii; Xbox 360
Fantasia: Music Evolved	Harmonix	2014	Xbox 360; Xbox One

=== Sports games ===
Main title / alternate title(s)	Developer	Release date	System (s)
Disney Golf	T&E SOFT Inc.	2002	PlayStation 2
Disney Sports Soccer	Konami	2002	Game Boy Advance; GameCube
Disney Sports Skateboarding	Konami	2002	Game Boy Advance; GameCube
Disney Sports Basketball	Konami	2002	Game Boy Advance; GameCube
Disney Sports Snowboarding	Konami	2003	Game Boy Advance
Disney Snow Sports	Disney Mobile Studios	2007	Mobile phone

=== The Disney Afternoon ===
The following games are based around DuckTales, Darkwing Duck and other Disney Afternoon properties.

Main title / alternate title(s)	Developer	Release date	System(s)
DuckTales	Capcom	1989	NES; Game Boy
DuckTales: The Quest for Gold	Incredible Technologies	1990	DOS; PC Windows; Amiga; Apple II; Commodore 64; Mac OS 8
DuckTales	Tiger Electronics	1990	Handheld LCD
Chip 'n Dale Rescue Rangers	Capcom	1990	NES
Chip 'n Dale Rescue Rangers: The Adventures in Nimnul's Castle	Hi Tech Expressions	1990	DOS
Darkwing Duck	Capcom	1992	NES; Game Boy
Darkwing Duck	Interactive Designs	1992	TurboGrafx-16
Darkwing Duck	Tiger Electronics	1992	Handheld LCD
Chip 'n Dale Rescue Rangers	Tiger Electronics	1992	Handheld LCD
Goof Troop	Capcom	1993	SNES
Disney's Goof Troop	Tiger Electronics	1993	Handheld LCD
Chip 'n Dale Rescue Rangers 2	Capcom	1993	NES
DuckTales 2	Capcom	1993	NES; Game Boy
Darkwing Duck	Disney Mobile Studios	2010	Mobile phone
Chip 'n Dale Rescue Rangers	Dynamic Pixels	2010	Mobile phone
DuckTales: Scrooge's Loot	Disney Mobile Studios	2013	iOS
DuckTales: Remastered	WayForward Technologies	2013	Windows; Xbox 360; PlayStation 3 Wii U iOS
The DuckForce Rises	Sanoma Media/Disney Mobile Studios	2015	iOS
The Disney Afternoon Collection	Digital Eclipse	2017	Windows; Xbox One; PlayStation 4

=== Other games ===
Games that do not fit in the above lists or the franchises they belong weren't listed above.

Main title / alternate title(s)	Developer	Release date	System(s)
Disney Magicboard Online	The Walt Disney Company	2007	Windows
Disney Othello	Disney Mobile Japan	2009	Mobile phone (Japan only)
Disney Infinity	Avalanche Software	2013	Wii, Xbox 360, Wii U, PlayStation 3, Nintendo 3DS, Windows
Disney Infinity: Marvel Super Heroes	Avalanche Software	2014	iOS, Xbox 360, Xbox One, Wii U, PlayStation 3, PlayStation 4, Nintendo 3DS, Windows
Disney Infinity 3.0	Avalanche Software	2015	iOS, Xbox 360, Xbox One, Wii U, PlayStation 3, PlayStation 4, Windows, Android
Disney Crossy Road	Hipster Whale	2016	iOS, Android
Disney Emoji Blitz	Disney Mobile	2016	iOS, Android
Disney Crossy Road	Adrenaline Amusements	2017	Arcade
Disney's Super Arcade	DisneyNOW	2018	iOS, Android
Disney Epic Quest	goGame	2019	iOS, Android
Disney Sorcerer's Arena	Glu Mobile	2020	iOS, Android

== Comics ==
=== Ongoing titles ===
Title	Publisher	Issues	Dates	Notes
Topolino (giornale)	Nerbini (n°1–136); Mondadori (n°137–738)	n°1–738	1932–1949	
Mickey Mouse Magazine (series 1)	Disney	#1–9	1933	
Mickey Mouse Magazine (series 2)	Disney	#1–24	1933–1940	
Le Journal de Mickey	Hachette		1934–present	
Mickey Mouse Magazine (series 3)	Disney	#1–60	1935–1940	
Walt Disney's Comics and Stories	Dell	#1–263	1940–1962	
Mickey Mouse	Dell	#28–330	1952–2017	
Walt Disney's Comics and Stories	Dell	#1–263	1940–1962	
Walt Disney's Christmas Parade	Dell	#1–9	1949–1958	Dell Giant
Topolino	Mondadori (n°1–1701); Disney Italia (n°1702–3018); Panini Comics (n°3019–present)	#1–263	1940–1962	
Chip 'n' Dale (series 1)	Dell	#4–30	1955–1962	
Walt Disney's Comics and Stories	Gold Key	#264–510	1962–1984	
The Phantom Blot	Gold Key	#1–7	1964–1966	
Super Goof	Gold Key	#1–57	1965–1980	
Chip 'n' Dale (series 2)	Gold Key	#1–83	1967–1984	
Walt Disney Comics Digest	Gold Key	#1–57	1968–1976	
Walt Disney's Comics and Stories (first run)	Gladstone	#511–547	1986–1990	
Mickey and Donald	Gladstone	#1–18	1988–1990	Continued as Donald and Mickey from #19.
Donald and Mickey (volume 1)	Gladstone	#19–30	1993–1995	Continued from Mickey and Donald from #18.
Walt Disney's Comics and Stories	Disney	#548–585	1990–1993	
Goofy Adventures	Disney	#1–17	1990–1991	
Mickey Mouse Adventures	Disney	#1–18	1990–1991	
Walt Disney's Comics and Stories (second run)	Gladstone	#586–633	1993–1998	
Walt Disney Giant	Gladstone	#1–7	1995–1996	
MM Mickey Mouse Mystery Magazine	Disney Italy	#0–11	1999–2001	
Walt Disney's Comics and Stories	Gemstone	#634–698	2003–2008	
Walt Disney's Comics and Stories	Boom!	#586–633	2009–2011	
Mickey Mouse and Friends	Boom!	#296–303	2009–2011	
Walt Disney's Comics and Stories	IDW	#721–756	2015–2020	
Mickey Mouse	IDW	#1–21 (#310–330)	2009–2011	
Mickey Mouse Shorts: Season One	IDW	#1–4	2016	Based on the 2013 TV series.
Donald and Mickey (Volume 2)	IDW	#1–4	2017–2018	Quarterly publication.

=== One-shots ===
Title	Publisher	Dates	Notes
Mickey Mouse and Goofy Explore Energy	1976	Disney	Educational comic produced in cooperation with the Exxon oil company.
Mickey and Goofy Explore Business	1978	Disney	
Mickey Mouse and Goofy Explore Energy Conservation	1978	Disney	
Mickey Mouse and Goofy Explore the Universe of Energy	1985	Disney	
Mickey, Donald, Goofy: The Three Musketeers	2004	Gemstone	Adaptation of the direct-to-video film.
Mickey's Twice Upon a Christmas	2004	Gemstone	Adaptation of the direct-to-video film.

== Books ==
Title	Author	Publisher	ISBN	Year	Notes
Mickey Mouse Book	Bobette Bibo and the Staff of the Walt Disney Studios	Bibo and Lang	[none]	1930	First Disney publication overall; contents include a prose story The Story of Mickey Mouse, a board game The Mickey Mouse Journey with directions and cutout pieces and a party plan Mickey Mouse March complete with lyrics for a song "Mickey Mouse (You Cute Little Feller)".
The Adventures of Mickey Mouse Book I	Staff of Walt Disney Studios	David McKay Company	[none]	1931	Followed by Book Number 2; 40 color illustrations in total.
Mickey Mouse Story Book	Staff of Walt Disney Studios	David McKay Company	[none]	1931	
Mickey Mouse Illustrated Movie Stories	Staff of Walt Disney Studios	David McKay Company	[none]	1931	Short story collection, with a total of 12 stories; supplemented with a "Miniature Movies" flip book feature.
The Adventures of Mickey Mouse Book Number 2	Staff of Walt Disney Studios	David McKay Company	[none]	1932	40 color illustrations in total.
Mickey Mouse Stories (Book No. 2)	Staff of Walt Disney Studios	David McKay Company	[none]	1934	
Mickey Mouse in Giantland	Staff of Walt Disney Studios	David McKay Company	[none]	1934	
Mickey Mouse and Tanglefoot	Walt Disney	Whitman Publishing Company	[none]	1934	Wee Little Books
Mickey Mouse's Uphill Fight	Walt Disney	Whitman Publishing Company	[none]	1934	Wee Little Books
Mickey Mouse Wins the Race!	Walt Disney	Whitman Publishing Company	[none]	1934	Wee Little Books
Mickey Mouse's Misfortune	Walt Disney	Whitman Publishing Company	[none]	1934	Wee Little Books
Mickey Mouse Will Not Quit!	Walt Disney	Whitman Publishing Company	[none]	1934	Wee Little Books
Mickey Mouse at the Carnival	Walt Disney	Whitman Publishing Company	[none]	1934	Wee Little Books
The Story of Mickey Mouse and the Smugglers	Walt Disney	Whitman Publishing Company	[none]	1935	Big Big Book series
Mickey Mouse and His Horse Tanglefoot	Staff of Walt Disney Studios	David McKay Company	[none]	1936	
Mickey Mouse in Pigmy Land	Walt Disney	Whitman Publishing Company	[none]	1936	
Mickey Mouse, Crusoe	Walt Disney	Whitman Publishing Company	[none]	1936	
The Mickey Mouse Fire Brigade	Walt Disney	Whitman Publishing Company	[none]	1936	
A Mickey Mouse ABC Story	Walt Disney	Whitman Publishing Company	[none]	1936	
The Mickey Mouse Mother Goose	Walt Disney	Whitman Publishing Company	[none]	1937	
Mickey Mouse Circus	Walt Disney	Birn Brothers, Ltd.	[none]	1936	
Mickey Mouse Sky High	Walt Disney	Birn Brothers, Ltd.	[none]	1937	
Mickey Mouse Air Pilot	Walt Disney	Birn Brothers, Ltd.	[none]	1937	
Donald Duck's Express to Funland	Walt Disney	Birn Brothers, Ltd.	[none]	1937	
Walt Disney's Story of Mickey Mouse	Walt Disney	Whitman Publishing Company	[none]	1938	Walt Disney's Story of... series
Walt Disney's Story of Minnie Mouse	Walt Disney	Whitman Publishing Company	[none]	1938	Walt Disney's Story of... series
Walt Disney's Story of Clarabelle Cow	Walt Disney	Whitman Publishing Company	[none]	1938	Walt Disney's Story of... series
Walt Disney's Story of Pluto the Pup	Walt Disney	Whitman Publishing Company	[none]	1938	Walt Disney's Story of... series
Walt Disney's Story of Dippy the Goof	Walt Disney	Whitman Publishing Company	[none]	1938	Walt Disney's Story of... series
Walt Disney's Story of Donald Duck	Walt Disney	Whitman Publishing Company	[none]	1938	Walt Disney's Story of... series
Mickey Mouse Has a Party	Staff of the Walt Disney Studios	Whitman Publishing Company	[none]	1938	School Reader series
Funny Stories About Donald and Mickey	Walt Disney	Whitman Publishing Company	[none]	1945	Short story collection, with a total of 36 stories.
Mickey Mouse and the Boy Thursday	Walt Disney	Whitman Publishing Company	[none]	1948	
Mickey Mouse - The Miracle Maker	Walt Disney	Whitman Publishing Company	[none]	1948	
Minnie Mouse and the Antique Chair	Walt Disney	Whitman Publishing Company	[none]	1948	
Poor Pluto	Walt Disney	Whitman Publishing Company	[none]	1948	
Mickey Mouse's Summer Vacation	Walt Disney	Whitman Publishing Company	[none]	1948	Story Hour Series
Mickey and the Beanstalk	Walt Disney	Whitman Publishing Company	[none]	1948	Story Hour Series
Donald and Mickey - Cub Scouts	Walt Disney	Whitman Publishing Company	[none]	1948	Cozy Corner Books
Mickey Mouse Stories	Unknown	Dean & Son, Ltd.	[none]	1952	Short story collection; followed by Mickey Mouse Tales
Mickey Mouse Tales	Unknown	Dean & Son, Ltd.	[none]	1953	Short story collection
Mickey Mouse Birthday Book	Annie North Bedford and Campbell Grant	Simon & Schuster	[none]	1953	Big Little Book series; short story collection with 13 stories in total.
Mickey Mouse and the Really Neat Robot	Unknown	Whitman Publishing Company	[none]	1970	Whitman Tell-A-Tale Book series
Mickey Mouse Big Story Book	Unknown	Purnell Books	ISBN 0361026862	1973	Short story collection, with 29 prose stories in total; supplemented with comic strips ("A High Dive" and Pluto Gives His Tricks), a "colour by numbers" page, a crossword puzzle (Mickey's Crossword), a cutout headband (Make a "Mickey" with Donald), a board game (They "Game" to Tea) and a puzzle game (It's All Buttoned Up).
Mickey Mouse and the Second Wish	Unknown	Whitman Publishing Company	ISBN 0307684180	1973	Whitman Tell-A-Tale Book series
Mickey and the Beanstalk	Unknown	Random House	ISBN 0394825500 (trade) / ISBN 0394925505 (lib. bdg.)	1975	Disney's Wonderful World of Reading #11
The Haunted House	Unknown	Random House	ISBN 0394825705 (trade) / ISBN 039492570X (lib. bdg.)	1975	Disney's Wonderful World of Reading #33; Later adapted for audio by Fisher-Price in 1981.
Mickey and the Magic Cloak	Unknown	Random House	ISBN 0394925661 (trade) / ISBN 9780394925660 (lib. bdg.)	1975	Disney's Wonderful World of Reading #36
Mickey Mouse: The Kitten-Sitters	Unknown	Western Publishing	ISBN 0307108236	1976	Little Golden Books series
Mickey Mouse and the Pet Show	Unknown	Whitman Publishing Company	ISBN 0307686175	1976	Whitman Tell-A-Tale Book series
Mickey Mouse and the World's Friendliest Monster	Unknown	Whitman Publishing Company	ISBN 0307686051	1976	Whitman Tell-A-Tale Book series
Mickey Mouse and Goofy: The Big Bear Scare	Unknown	Western Publishing	ISBN 0307603180	1978	Little Golden Book #100-4
Pluto the Detective	Unknown	Random House	ISBN 0394843967 (trade) / ISBN 9780394843964 (lib. bdg.)	1980	Disney's Wonderful World of Reading
Fool's Gold	Unknown	Random House	ISBN 0394858840	1983	Disney's Wonderful World of Reading
A Picnic in the Woods	Unknown	Random House	ISBN 0394858735	1983	Disney's Wonderful World of Reading
Mickey and Goofy's Race Around the World	Unknown	Random House	ISBN 0394870328	1984	Disney's Wonderful World of Reading
Mickey Mouse Heads for the Sky	Unknown	Western Publishing	ISBN 0307010007	1987	Little Golden Books series
Mickey Mouse in: Sky Island	Nikki Grimes	The Mallard Press	ISBN 0792454014	1990	Mickey Mouse Adventures
Mickey Mouse in: The Cactus Kid	Lee Nordling	The Mallard Press	ISBN 0792454065	1990	Mickey Mouse Adventures
Mickey Mouse in: The Barracuda Triangle	Floyd Norman	The Mallard Press	ISBN 0792454022	1990	Mickey Mouse Adventures
Mickey Mouse in: The Phantom Blot	Lee Nordling	The Mallard Press	ISBN 0792454030	1990	Mickey Mouse Adventures
Mickey Mouse in: Bing Bong	Lee Nordling	The Mallard Press	ISBN 0792454057	September 1990	Mickey Mouse Adventures
Mickey Mouse in: The Viking's Eye	Nikki Grimes	The Mallard Press	ISBN 0792454049	November 1990	Mickey Mouse Adventures
