= Illusion (video game series) =

Series of platforming video games licensed by Disney

- Logo utilized in Castle of Illusion Starring Mickey Mouse (2013)
- Genre: Platformer
- Developer: Sega
- Publisher: Sega
- Platforms: Master System, Sega Genesis, Game Gear, PlayStation 3, Xbox 360, Microsoft Windows, Android, iOS
- First release: Castle of Illusion Starring Mickey Mouse; November 21, 1990
- Latest release: Disney Illusion Island; July 28, 2023
- Parent series: Mickey Mouse Universe

Illusion, known in Japan as I Love Mickey Mouse, (Note: Japanese: アイラブミッキーマウス, Hepburn: Ai Rabu Mikkī Mausu) is a series of platforming video games developed and published by Sega for its consoles Master System, Sega Genesis and Game Gear. The series follows the adventures of Disney's cartoon character Mickey Mouse (sometimes with Donald Duck) between various fantasy worlds. The series includes Castle of Illusion, and its sequels Land of Illusion, World of Illusion and Legend of Illusion.

== Games ==
Release timeline
1990	Castle of Illusion Starring Mickey Mouse
1991
1992	Land of Illusion Starring Mickey Mouse
1992	World of Illusion Starring Mickey Mouse and Donald Duck
1993–1994
1995	Legend of Illusion Starring Mickey Mouse
1996	The Disney Collection: Castle of Illusion & Quackshot
1997
1998	Sega Ages: I Love Mickey Mouse
1999–2011
2012	Epic Mickey: Power of Illusion
2013	Castle of Illusion Starring Mickey Mouse
2014–2022
2023	Disney Illusion Island

=== Main series ===
==== Castle of Illusion Starring Mickey Mouse ====
The first game in the series, released for Mega Drive in 1990, followed by a Master System and Game Gear version in 1991. When Minnie Mouse is kidnapped by an evil witch named Mizrabel, Mickey must travel to the Castle of Illusion and visit various strange worlds in order to recover seven magical gems and rescue Minnie. The 8-bit versions feature significantly different elements from the Mega Drive version.

==== Land of Illusion Starring Mickey Mouse ====
Released for Master System and Game Gear in 1993. Waking up in a strange village of fairy tales, Mickey is sent on a quest to recover a magical crystal that was stolen from the village, causing it to fall into sadness.

==== World of Illusion Starring Mickey Mouse and Donald Duck ====
Released in 1992 for the Mega Drive. As Mickey and Donald prepare for a magic act, they stumble upon a mysterious box that traps them in a mystical world of illusion. In order to escape, Mickey and Donald must work together to learn new magic tricks and defeat the evil magician who sent them there. The game features co-operative gameplay, allowing two players to work together like Mickey and Donald to progress through the level.

==== Legend of Illusion Starring Mickey Mouse ====
Released for the Game Gear in 1995, with a Master System version released in Brazil in 1998. Mickey is a janitor who must save his kingdom, since the fearful king Pete left the crown to the mouse, because only a king can save them from the clouds that bring sorrow.

==== Castle of Illusion Starring Mickey Mouse (2013 video game) ====
A remake of the game was developed by Sega Studios Australia for PlayStation Network, Xbox Live Arcade and PC. The game revisits the world and gameplay of the original Mega Drive title whilst featuring high definition 3D graphics and remastered sound. The game was released in September 2013.

=== Compilations ===
==== The Disney Collection: Castle of Illusion Starring Mickey Mouse & Quackshot Starring Donald Duck ====
A compilation of Castle of Illusion and QuackShot in a single cartridge, released exclusively in Europe for the Sega Mega Drive in 1996.

==== Sega Ages: I Love Mickey Mouse ====
A compilation of Castle of Illusion and QuackShot which was released exclusively in Japan for the Sega Saturn in 1998.

=== Related games ===
==== Fantasia ====
Released in 1991 for Mega Drive, this was a platform game based on sequences from the 1940 film, developed by Infogrames but published by Sega. Although initially reported as a sequel to Castle of Illusion, the game was poorly received and was forced to be withdrawn from sale after issues with intellectual rights came to light.

==== QuackShot Starring Donald Duck ====
Released in 1991 for Mega Drive. Players control Donald Duck as he searches for a mysterious treasure while evading the clutches of Pete.

==== The Lucky Dime Caper Starring Donald Duck ====
Released in 1991 for Master System and Game Gear. Donald goes on a quest to recover Scrooge McDuck's Lucky Dime, which was stolen by an evil witch.

==== Deep Duck Trouble Starring Donald Duck ====
Released in 1993 for Master System and Game Gear. When Scrooge is placed under a curse and inflates like a balloon, Donald goes on a quest to recover a treasure that can undo the curse.

==== Epic Mickey: Power of Illusion ====
While not part of Sega's series of games, Power of Illusion is instead a tribute to Castle of Illusion (with similar story elements from said game returning in the game) being developed by DreamRift for the Nintendo 3DS as a follow-up to 2010s Epic Mickey. The plot focuses on Mizrabel, now forgotten and a resident of the Wasteland for forgotten characters, attempting to pull popular characters into her new castle of illusion in order to leave them trapped and escape the Wasteland herself. Mickey comes to stop her after being contacted by Oswald the Lucky Rabbit about her scheme. The game features classic sprite animation reminiscent of the Mega Drive games while including more recent features such as paint and thinner. The game was released in November 2012.

==== Disney Illusion Island ====
A side-scrolling co-op platform game developed by Dlala Studios and published by Disney Games named Disney Illusion Island was released on Nintendo Switch in July 2023.

== See also ==
- List of Disney video games
- List of Sega video game franchises
