= Disney Sports =

Disney Sports may refer to:

- Disney Sports (video game series), a series of Disney-branded sports video games
- Sports, also referred to as ESPN, one of the primary business segments of the Walt Disney Company

== See also ==
- Disney Sports Enterprises
