= Disney Illusion Island =

2023 video game

- Developer: Dlala Studios
- Publisher: Disney Games
- Director: Aj Grand-Scrutton
- Producers: Victoria Webb (Lead); Nick Dorsett; Christopher Reynolds; Alex Kay
- Designers: Grant Allen; Miljan Glenny; Liam Welton
- Programmers: Ben Waring; Chris Rickett; John-Evans Wagenaar; Luke Amer; Fletcher Morris
- Artists: Lucy Kyriakidou; Yeonjae Lee; Rory Jobson
- Writer: Kelsy Abbott
- Composer: David Housden
- Engine: Unity
- Platforms: Nintendo Switch; PlayStation 5; Windows; Xbox Series X/S
- Release: Nintendo Switch; July 28, 2023; PlayStation 5, Windows, Xbox Series X/S; May 30, 2025
- Genre: Platform
- Modes: Single-player, multiplayer

Disney Illusion Island is a 2023 platform game developed by Dlala Studios and published by Disney Games. The game was released on Nintendo Switch on July 28, 2023. It was later released under the title Disney Illusion Island Starring Mickey & Friends for Windows, PlayStation 5, and Xbox Series X/S on May 30, 2025.

Disney Illusion Island received mixed reviews from critics.

== Gameplay ==
In the game, Mickey Mouse, Minnie Mouse, Donald Duck and Goofy must overcome various platforming obstacles to progress

Disney Illusion Island is a 2D side-scrolling platformer with a Metroidvania-like game structure. After choosing one of four characters – Mickey Mouse, Minnie Mouse, Donald Duck or Goofy – players travel through areas using an expanding map of the Monoth island. Despite presenting different animations, the characters play the same. Players can walk and jump, and, as they progress, the characters obtain more platforming abilities like double jumping, wall jumping, ground-pounding and swinging. Collectibles in the game include Glimts, small balls of light that unlock concept game art and the island's lore; Tokuns, which display character art and backstories; hidden Mickey shapes in the background, which show photos of Mickey and his friends; and Mickey memorabilia, which reference previous Mickey cartoons.

The game lacks any direct combat mechanic, so players have to avoid attacks from enemies encountered throughout the journey. The game sometimes has areas where players engage in boss fights, during which they have to avoid attacks, press buttons or perform other platforming activities in order to indirectly harm the boss. Getting hit makes players lose one life (represented as a heart), and losing all their lives makes them return to the last mailbox that they passed through (functioning as a checkpoint). Each player can adjust the number of lives given at the beginning of a checkpoint and can also choose to activate invincibility mode. The game offers a local co-op multiplayer mode, enabling players to hug others to restore both their lives and drop ropes to help other players climb obstacles.

== Plot ==
Mickey, Minnie, Donald, and Goofy arrive on Monoth Island, expecting a picnic. They discover a giant bookshelf and meet Toku, leader of the Hokuns creatures, who admits to inviting them for a fake picnic. Toku seeks their help to recover three stolen Tomes of Knowledge that protect the island. Aspiring to become heroes, Mickey and his friends accept the mission. During the search, inventor Mazzy provides them with new abilities to unlock new areas. They retrieve the Tomes of Engineering, Botany, and Astronomy by battling against three bosses in different biomes. After each battle, Mickey's team cast a spell taught by Toku that turns defeated enemies into stone statues.

Placing the Tomes on the bookshelf reveals a portal. After the Hokuns take the Tomes and enter it, the bookshelf transforms into the Tome of History. They learn from it that four heroes who once ruled the island created the Tomes to share knowledge with the public. Grayzar, the creator of the Tome of History, desired the other Tomes' power and was defeated in a battle and banished by the other three heroes. Mickey and his friends use the spell in reverse to free the defeated guardians, who then open a portal for Mickey's team to enter and prevent Toku from returning Grayzar into Monoth. The group faces Grayzar, who was disguised as Mazzy, and breaks his spell, making Grayzar friendly. Grayzar reveals Toku manipulated him during the previous battle against the three heroes and he projected his subconscious to aid Mickey's team with no knowledge of Toku's plan.

They find Toku casting a spell with the Tomes in order to control the island. Despite Toku's attempts at excuses, Minnie kicks him far away. The group interrupts the spell that was still being executed by the Tomes with the help of four words given by Grayzar. In the end, the group shows the Tomes to Grayzar and the other three guardians, who then call them heroes and let them guard the Tomes. Grayzar and Mickey's team celebrate with a picnic while the Hokuns assault Toku elsewhere.

== Development and release ==
Disney Illusion Island was developed by Dlala Studios, based in Essex, England. AJ Grand-Scrutton, the team's CEO and creative director, stated that inspiration was taken from modern games like Rayman Legends (2013) as well as Mickey games of the 90s, particularly from the Illusion series, of which Illusion Island was seen as a spiritual successor during development. The nature of the characters' movement was one of the most significant design pillars. Combat was kept to a relative minimum, as they did not deem the characters suitable for this gameplay's style. The ability of characters to drop ropes was taken from World of Illusion.

The game was released by Disney Electronic Content on July 28, 2023. A free "Keeper Up" update, with new time-based challenges, accessibility features and an adjusted map, was released on December 13 the same year. The second free update, "Mystery in Monoth", was announced through the June 2024 Nintendo Direct and was released the same day the direct premiered. Another update titled "C.A.S.H." was released on May 30, 2025, alongside the game's release on PlayStation 5, Windows, and Xbox Series X/S.

== Reception ==
Reception

Aggregate scores
Aggregator	Score
Metacritic	(PS5) 74/100 (NS) 73/100
OpenCritic	51% recommend

Review scores
Publication	Score
Destructoid	7/10
Digital Trends	3.5/5
Eurogamer	3/5
Game Informer	8.5/10
GameSpot	7/10
GamesRadar+	3.5/5
Hardcore Gamer	4/5
HobbyConsolas	78/100
IGN	7/10
Nintendo Life	9/10
Nintendo World Report	9/10
PCMag	3.5/5
Shacknews	8/10
The Guardian	2/5
Video Games Chronicle	3/5

Disney Illusion Island received "mixed or average reviews" from critics, according to the review aggregator platform Metacritic. Fellow review aggregator OpenCritic assessed that the game received fair approval, being recommended by 51% of critics.

David Housen's score for the game earned special praise from Game Informer alongside the visuals, voice acting and gameplay.

=== Sales ===
In 2023, Disney Illusion Island was the 18th best-selling game in the United Kingdom during the final week of July. In Japan, it was the 7th best-selling title for the week of July 24 to 30. It was later the 16th best-selling game in Japan during the following week, from July 31 to August 6.

=== Awards ===
Awards and nominations for Disney Illusion Island
Year	Award	Category	Result	Ref
2023	TIGA Awards	Best Social Game	Won	
2023	TIGA Awards	Best Puzzle Game	Nominated	
2023	TIGA Awards	Game of the Year	Won	
2023	The Game Awards 2023	Best Family Game	Nominated	
2024	13th New York Game Awards	Central Park Children’s Zoo Award for Best Kids Game	Nominated	
2024	27th Annual D.I.C.E. Awards	Family Game of the Year	Nominated	
2024	20th British Academy Games Awards	British Game	Nominated	
2024	20th British Academy Games Awards	Family	Nominated	
2024	20th British Academy Games Awards	Multiplayer	Longlisted	
