= The Lucky Dime Caper Starring Donald Duck =

1991 video game

- Master System box art
- Developer: Sega
- Publisher: Sega
- Designer: Emirin
- Platforms: Game Gear; Master System
- Release: Game Gear: NA: October 1991; EU: November 1991; JP: December 20, 1991; Master System: EU: 1991
- Genre: Platform
- Mode: Single-player

The Lucky Dime Caper Starring Donald Duck (Note: Known in Japan as Donald Duck's Lucky Dime (Japanese: ドナルドダックのラッキーダイム, Hepburn: Donarudo Dakku no Rakkī Daimu)) is a 1991 platform game developed and published by Sega for the Game Gear and Master System. The player controls Donald Duck as he attempts to retrieve the Number One Dime from Magica De Spell. Another game featuring Donald Duck for the Game Gear and Master System, Deep Duck Trouble, was released in December 1993.

== Gameplay ==
The game is a side-scrolling platformer. The gameplay follows the same pattern of Castle of Illusion Starring Mickey Mouse, which was released for Sega consoles a year before, but unlike Mickey, Donald can attack enemies by hitting them with a hammer or throwing discs. He can also attack faster by collecting star items.

The game consists of seven stages: the Northern Woods, the Great American Forest, the Andes Mountains, the Tropical Isles, the Pyramids and the South Pole, followed finally by Magica's Castle.

Despite the Master System and Game Gear being very similar systems, there are some differences between the two versions of the game:

- While following the same storyline, the intro sequences are different.
- The level select screen on the Game Gear does not have any music.
- The layout of platforms and enemy positions are different.
- In the Game Gear version, bonus items are pre-placed in the level, whereas in the Master System version they are only obtainable by defeating enemies.
- The Master System version has a timer while the Game Gear version has not.
- The Master System version allows players to backtrack, while the Game Gear version does not.
- Collecting five stars in the Master System game gives players limited invulnerability, while the Game Gear version gives additional points.
- When hit by an enemy, Donald loses his hammer weapon in the Master System version; it can be obtained as bonus item after defeating an enemy. The hammer is not lost when hit by an enemy in the Game Gear version.

== Plot ==
Screenshot of the Master System version.

The evil witch Magica De Spell has stolen Scrooge McDuck's Number One Dime and kidnapped his nephews, Huey, Dewey, and Louie. Donald Duck embarks on a mission, traveling around the world to save his three nephews and recover Scrooge's lucky dime.

== Release ==
The UK version of The Lucky Dime Caper was sold in a limited edition box set that included a Donald Duck-themed T-shirt and cassette tape with a selection of eight Disney music songs.

== Reception ==
Reception

Review scores
Publication	Score	
Publication	Game Gear	Master System
Computer and Video Games	N/A	90%
Console XS	N/A	85%
Sega Force	78%	92%
Sega Master Force	N/A	78%

In a 1992 review, Game Zone described the game as "A bit on the slow side maybe but nice graphics, just about the right level of challenge and a fair variety of gameplay make up for that". In 1993, Sega Master Force stated "Although The Lucky Dime Caper's tough for a Disney game, it's a lot of fun and many players welcome a challenge. Great graphics, sound and game design have made it a classic."

In a 2010 retrospective review for HardcoreGaming101, Audun Sorlie remarks that although “it looks and sounds absolutely fantastic,” the game tends to feel “rushed,” offering “little new,” and noting that “the standard ice, desert, underwater and lava‑infested castles make their law‑required appearances.” Donald’s slow, slippery movement was also criticized, with his jump singled out as “one of the very worst in Sega platformers.”

In the United Kingdom, The Lucky Dime Caper reached second place on the Master System chart published by Mean Machines in February 1992, behind Sonic the Hedgehog and ahead of Xenon II.
