= Mickey no Tokyo Disneyland Daibōken =

1994 video game

- Developer: Graphic Research Co.
- Publisher: Tomy
- Composers: Shigenori Masuko; Yoko Suzuki; Maki Kirioka
- Platform: Super Famicom
- Release: JP: December 16, 1994
- Genre: Platformer
- Mode: Single-player

Mickey no Tokyo Disneyland Daibōken (ミッキーの東京ディズニーランド大冒険, Mikkī no Tōkyō Dizunīrando Daibōken; "Mickey's Great Adventure in Tokyo Disneyland") is a 1994 platform game developed by Graphic Research Co. and published by Tomy for the Super Famicom. It is set in the Tokyo Disneyland theme park and follows the player as MIckey Mouse traversing through six different attractions in order to gather his friends after Pete told them it was an off-day. With the use of water and gas balloons, the player can attack enemies and navigate environmental obstacles.

== Gameplay ==
Mickey no Tokyo Disneyland Daibōken is a side-scrolling platform game. It's plot follows Mickey Mouse, the player character, traversing the Tokyo Disneyland theme park in order to round up his friends, who had been tricked by Pete into thinking it was an off-day. Mickey wields a balloon backpack machine equipped with water and gas balloons that are able to attack enemies; the former only able to fire forward and the latter directly upwards. In addition, when fully charged, they can also be used to navigate environmental hazards, with water balloons able to weigh down switches and gas balloons letting Mickey float upwards in the air for a short while or to fly with a burst of speed.

There are treasure chests scattered around for the player to find. The invincibility novelty Mickey cap that will make the player invincible for a limited amount of time. Two forms of Mickey currency, Mickey pouch and Mickey Tokens, add coins to the player's inventory and over time earns them an extra life. The Red Mickey novelty toy restores one to four parts of the player's life bar. The Mickey tour guide earns the player one extra life.

== Release ==
It was released on December 16, 1994 for the Super Famicom.

== See also ==
- Adventures in the Magic Kingdom
- Walt Disney World Quest: Magical Racing Tour
- Kinect: Disneyland Adventures
- List of Disney video games
