= Disney Sports Snowboarding =

2003 video game

- Developer: Konami
- Publisher: Konami
- Platform: Game Boy Advance
- Release: JP: January 16, 2003; NA: February 4, 2003; EU: May 23, 2003
- Genre: Racing
- Modes: Single-player, Multiplayer

Disney Sports Snowboarding is a 2003 snowboarding racing video game developed and published by Konami for the Game Boy Advance. The game is part of a series of Disney-licensed sports titles under the Disney Sports brand. Upon release, the game received mixed to average reception, with praise directed towards the game's pre-rendered background visuals and range of collectables, and criticism to the controls, course design and limited content.

== Gameplay ==
A screenshot of Disney Sports Snowboarding.

Players compete in races, rallies, trick competitions and time trials. The game features six playable characters, including Mickey, Minnie, Donald, Daisy, Goofy, and Pete. Players steer using the L and R buttons and perform tricks using the control pad. Tricks are performed when scaling ramps, which fill a trick meter. Players can collect 'trick cards' when performing a trick when the card is displayed onscreen. Achieving victory in a race unlocks a new snowboard, with over 30 to collect in the game, each with different attributes that affect speed, handling and the ability to perform tricks and magic powers. When the trick gauge is filled, players can use the board's magic power, which can grant speed boosts, or earthquake and lightning effects that slow other players. Players are also able to race or exchange boards with another player using the Game Link Cable, and unlock an additional snowboard and ability by connecting the game to a GameCube with the title Disney Sports Soccer.

== Reception ==
Reception

Aggregate score
Aggregator	Score
Metacritic	59/100

Review scores
Publication	Score
Famitsu	22/40
GameSpy	1/5 stars
IGN	6/10
Jeuxvideo.com	8/20
Nintendo Power	2.5/5
Nintendo World Report	7/10
X-Play	4/5 stars

The game received "mixed" reviews according to the review aggregation website Metacritic. In Japan, Famitsu gave it a score of one five, two sixes, and one five for a total of 22 out of 40.

The visual presentation received a mixed reception. Brad Kane of Extended Play stated that the game featured "colorful imagery" and "creative levels", although he felt the graphics could be "a little smoother in places". Craig Harris of IGN similarly felt the pre-rendered graphics interacted poorly with the character sprites and made "all the courses look almost exactly the same".

The gameplay and controls also received mixed assessments. Andy Dursin of Nintendo World Report enjoyed the game's "solid assortment" of modes, unlockables, and multiplayer features, finding it to be a "well-rounded package" although "straightforward and less complicated than previous entries" in the Disney Sports series. Kane found the gameplay enjoyable and highlighted the game's range of collectibles and unlockables. Describing the game as "not much fun", David Hodgson of GameSpy discussed the game's "tedious" trick and board collecting system and "slow and imprecise" gameplay, noting the game's tracks were quickly completed. Harris considered the game to have little to do beyond the item collection due to there being "not a whole lot of variety in the courses".
