= Land of Illusion Starring Mickey Mouse =

1993 video game

- Master System cover art
- Developer: Sega
- Publisher: Sega
- Director: Yoshio Yoshida
- Producer: Patrick Gilmore
- Designers: Yoshio Yoshida; Go Sugai
- Programmer: Takashi Shoji
- Artists: Gen Adachi; Takako Kawaguchi; Ihsakat Emuk
- Composers: Tomonori Sawada; Keisuke Tsukahara; Izuho Numata
- Series: Illusion
- Platforms: Game Gear, Master System
- Release: Game Gear: JP: March 26, 1993; NA: March 1993; EU: 1993; Master System: EU: April 1993; BR: 1994
- Genre: Platform
- Mode: Single-player

Land of Illusion Starring Mickey Mouse, known in Japan as Mickey Mouse no Mahō no Crystal (ミッキーマウスの魔法のクリスタル), is a 1993 platform game developed and published by Sega for the Game Gear and Master System.

== Gameplay ==
Land of Illusion is a side-scrolling platform game, with the player traversing through 14 levels, trying to retrieve the crystal to the villagers. Mickey can attack his enemies by picking up an item (such as a stone block) and throwing it at his enemies, or he can jump at them in a sitting pose. The stages consist of the Forest, Lake, Blacksmith's Castle, Castle Ruins, Tiny Cavern, Flower Field, Toy Workshop, Palace Ruins, Craggy Cliff, Desert, Good Princess's Castle, Sand Castle, Island, and the Phantom's Castle.

Throughout the game, the player can pick up items that imbue Mickey with new abilities, such as a rope for climbing up walls or a potion that can make Mickey shrink in size. Furthermore, the player can then return to previous levels and utilize these items to gain access to previously inaccessible areas.

Mickey begins the game with two power stars indicating how many hits he can take by enemies. Power stars can be collected throughout the game to give Mickey more health to a maximum of 5. However, there is one power star on every level making 14 in total. Each star collected after collecting 5 gives full health and an extra try. Most of them are in inaccessible areas which require many of the special items collected throughout the game. Upon completion of the game, the number of stars the player collects is tallied. Collecting all 14 stars gives a special score bonus and shows a special ending upon completion of the game where images of all the characters are shown.

== Plot ==
When starting up the game, a short movie is shown. Mickey falls asleep with a book of fairy tales in his lap, later waking up in a strange village. A girl (looking like Daisy Duck) comes up to him asking him for help. She says the village's magic crystal' has been stolen by an evil Phantom. As a result, the beautiful happiness in her village has been replaced with sadness. Deciding to help the villagers, Mickey sets out to the North Mountains, to find the Princess who knows how to reach the Phantom's Castle in the Clouds.

The game's story has no direct connections to either its predecessor, Castle of Illusion, or its sequel, World of Illusion.

== Reception ==
Reception

Review scores
Publication	Score	
Publication	Game Gear	Master System
Electronic Gaming Monthly	32/40	–
Sega Master Force	89%	92%
Mega Zone	92%	N/A
Nottingham Post	88%	N/A

Award
Publication	Award
Ação Games	The Best of No 1

The game was generally well received by critics. The Nottingham Post gave the Game Gear version 88% commenting: "The graphics are cute and the game is straightforward and challenging enough to appeal to just about anybody."

== See also ==
- List of Disney video games
