= Disney's Magical Quest =

- Genre: Platformer
- Developer: Capcom
- Platforms: Super NES, Genesis, GBA
- First release: The Magical Quest Starring Mickey Mouse; 1992
- Latest release: Disney's Magical Quest 3 Starring Mickey & Donald; 1995
- Parent series: Mickey Mouse video games

Disney's Magical Quest (Note: Known in Japan as Mickey's Magical Adventure (Japanese: ミッキーのマジカルアドベンチャー, Hepburn: Mikī no Majikaru Adobenchā)) is a Disney platform game trilogy released by Capcom. The games star Mickey Mouse and (depending on the game version) either Minnie Mouse or Donald Duck, who must defeat Pete. The gameplay is similar amongst all games in the series: the player must move as in a typical platform game, defeating enemies either by jumping on them or by grabbing and throwing blocks at them.

One of the most notable gameplay features of the series is the ability to change characters' outfits, which give characters different special abilities. Other gameplay elements in the series include the ability to expand the player's health meter by collecting special hearts, and to shop for items using coins that are scattered throughout the game.

== The Magical Quest Starring Mickey Mouse ==
The Magical Quest Starring Mickey Mouse
- Front cover of North American SNES version
- Developer: Capcom
- Publishers: Capcom (SNES); Nintendo (GBA)
- Producer: Noah Dudley
- Designer: Hisashi Yamamoto (Credited as MX-5)
- Programmer: Masatsugu Shinohara (Credited as M30)
- Composer: Mari Yamaguchi (Credited as Mari)
- Platforms: Super NES; Game Boy Advance
- Release: SNES version: JP: November 20, 1992; NA: December 1992; EU: March 18, 1993; GBA version: JP: August 9, 2002; NA: August 13, 2002; EU: September 27, 2002
- Genre: Platformer
- Modes: Single-player; SNES; Two players (Alternating turns); GBA; Two-player competitive

The Magical Quest Starring Mickey Mouse, the first game in the series, was released for the Super Nintendo Entertainment System during 1992 and 1993 and later re-released for the Game Boy Advance in 2002. Featuring six different levels with four different special outfits it stars Mickey Mouse on his journey to save his dog Pluto, who was dognapped by Emperor Pete during a game of catch with his friends Donald Duck and Goofy. The game, and especially its outfit system and graphics, received mostly positive reviews, but was criticized for being relatively short. A port was originally planned for the Sega Mega Drive, but was abandoned.

=== Story ===
Mickey Mouse, Pluto, Goofy and Donald Duck are playing catch in the park. When it is Goofy's turn to throw the ball, he accidentally throws it too far. Pluto runs off chasing the ball and Goofy runs after Pluto, leaving Mickey alone. Mickey goes searching for his friends after a while, but falls down a cliff into a strange magical land. Later, Mickey meets an old wizard who tells Mickey that Pluto has been dognapped by the land's ruler, Emperor Pete. After besting Pete, Mickey rescues Pluto, but in that moment he wakes up in his bed, revealing that the events of the game were merely a dream, and Donald suggests they play another game of catch. Mickey happily agrees and he, his friends and Pluto all live happily ever after.

=== Outfits ===
Mickey Mouse can wear four different outfits in The Magical Quest Starring Mickey Mouse. Some outfits can be upgraded in the stores found throughout the game.

Mickey starts in his traditional clothing. It allows him to grab certain objects and spin-throw them. Mickey's first unlockable outfit, the magician outfit, is awarded to him in the beginning of the second level and allows Mickey to shoot magic blasts at enemies. The magic blasts fired are larger the longer they are charged. However, shooting magic drains Mickey's magic meter, which is refilled by collecting magical lamps. Additionally, Mickey can breathe underwater and control magic carpets while wearing it.

The firefighter uniform that Mickey finds in the third level allows him to spray water streams at enemies. In addition, the water stream can be used to put out fires, push blocks and form icicles. Similarly to the magician outfit, spraying water with the firefighter uniform drains Mickey's water meter which is refilled by collecting fire hydrant items.

In the fourth level of the game Goofy gives Mickey the mountain-climbing gear, which allows Mickey to use a grappling hook to attach to certain objects. He can then hoist or swing himself up on top of them. Moreover, his grappling hook can be used to grab items. The grappling hook can also be used as a weapon to grab enemies and spin-throw them.

=== Game Boy Advance remake ===
The game was remade for the Game Boy Advance in 2002 with the name Disney's Magical Quest Starring Mickey and Minnie. It was developed by Capcom and published by Nintendo. In the GBA version Minnie Mouse was added to the game as a playable character, though she is identical in gameplay to Mickey. Additionally, four minigames for both single-player and multiplayer were added to the remake. The multiplayer mini-games were played with the GBA link cable and only one cartridge was needed to play with a friend. Notably, the GBA port also introduced a save feature and could connect to Disney's Magical Mirror Starring Mickey Mouse via the GameCube–Game Boy Advance link cable.

=== Reception ===
Reception

Aggregate score
Aggregator	Score
GameRankings	86% (SNES)

Review scores
Publication	Score
Electronic Gaming Monthly	9/10, 9/10, 9/10, 9/10
Famitsu	8/10, 7/10, 8/10, 7/10
GameSpot	6.6 out of 10 (GBA)
IGN	6 out of 10 (GBA)
SNES Force	91% (SNES)
Super Play	89% (SNES)

The Super NES version of The Magical Quest Starring Mickey Mouse was generally well received by critics. Most reviewers praised the detailed and colorful graphics and animations in the game, with some reviewers even calling them some of the best on the system to date. The bosses and backgrounds were specifically praised for their appearance. The outfit system was also well received and many critics felt it added depth to the gameplay. The sound and music received mixed to positive ratings, as some thought the music loops were too short and that the sound wasn't up to par with the rest of the game, while some found the music and sound effects very suitable for a Disney cartoon game. A great deal of the criticism was attributed to the difficulty of the game. Many reviewers believed that the game was too easy and/or short, primarily due to the game's unlimited continues that allowed the player to replay a level until finished, which lead to them recommending the game only for younger children. To counter the game's relatively low difficulty, some reviewers felt that the game's difficulty option should be set to hard to enjoy the game fully.^{[a]} The Super NES version sold 1.2 million copies worldwide.

The Game Boy Advance version of the game received mixed reviews. Again, most critics liked the graphics of the game, although some thought that the GBA version had slightly worse graphics than the SNES version. The cropped backgrounds and smaller view area in comparison to the SNES version were noted. The game's length was also criticized, as the original SNES version was. Most critics considered the GBA-specific multiplayer mini-games to add little value to the game; the fact that the Game Boy Advance consoles must be turned off and on to change multiplayer game was also not well received. On the other hand, being able to play multiplayer with only one cartridge was held in high regard.^{[b]}

In 2009, GamesRadar ranked the game fifth on their list of the seven best Disney games, saying "This is another brilliant example of using a license properly, not falling back on it entirely. Mickey alone could have sold this game, but as was common in Capcom's early Disney games, the gameplay was fleshed out beyond contemporary offerings and would have proudly succeeded without the license at all." IGN rated the game 23rd in its "Top 100 SNES Games of All Time". They praised the "spectacular" platforming and the costume-based action.

== The Great Circus Mystery Starring Mickey & Minnie ==
The Great Circus Mystery Starring Mickey & Minnie
- Front cover of North American SNES version
- Developer: Capcom (Note: Ported to Game Boy Advance by Klein Computer Entertainment)
- Publisher: Capcom
- Producer: Noah Dudley
- Composer: Makoto Tomozawa
- Platforms: Super NES; Genesis; Game Boy Advance
- Release: Super NES: NA: October 1994; JP: November 11, 1994; EU: 1995; Mega Drive/Genesis: JP: December 16, 1994; NA: December 1994 Game Boy Advance; JP: July 18, 2003; EU: August 28, 2003; NA: November 11, 2003
- Genre: Platformer
- Modes: Single-player; Two-player cooperative

The Great Circus Mystery Starring Mickey & Minnie, later titled Disney's Magical Quest 2 Starring Mickey & Minnie, was released for the Super NES and Mega Drive/Genesis in 1994 and for the Game Boy Advance in 2003. The game features Mickey Mouse and Minnie Mouse trying to figure out why everyone in the circus has disappeared, and includes four different outfits and six different levels. While the Super NES and Genesis versions were practically identical, the GBA re-release in 2003 included some new features. As with its predecessor, it received praise for its graphics and outfit system but was criticized for its difficulty and length.

=== Story ===
Mickey and Minnie Mouse travel by bus to the circus at the edge of town where they are going to spend the day. When the bus arrives, a little late, Goofy appears and tells Mickey and Minnie that everyone in the circus tents has disappeared. Mickey and Minnie are surprised by Goofy's claim, but choose to go to the circus and see it with their own eyes. At the circus they realize that their friends Pluto and Donald are gone. Mickey and Minnie must now find out what is going on at the circus.

=== Changes ===
Unlike the first game, Minnie Mouse also features as a playable character. In a single-player game the player can choose to play as either Mickey or Minnie, but the choice makes no difference to gameplay and is purely aesthetic. Moreover, the game features two player cooperative gameplay, unlike the previous game where the players had to take turns. Another new feature is a password back-up, allowing the player(s) to continue where they stopped playing the game.

=== Outfits ===
The Great Circus Mystery Starring Mickey & Minnie features four different outfits.

Similar to the first game in the series, the default outfit allows Mickey and Minnie to grab certain objects, including some enemies, and spin-throw them away. The first unlockable outfit, the sweeper outfit, allows Mickey and Minnie to suck up certain enemies with their vacuum cleaner. If an enemy is sucked up using the vacuum cleaner outfit, the enemy turns into a coin. Using the vacuum cleaner consumes battery power which can be refilled by collecting battery items.

The second unlockable outfit, the safari suit, allows Mickey and Minnie to climb walls, slide down from vines/ropes and swing from special circular blocks. The third and final unlockable outfit, the cowboy outfit, includes a hobby horse and a pop-gun. The hobby horse grants Mickey and Minnie a higher jump and the pop-gun allows Mickey and Minnie to damage enemies by firing corks at them. Firing a cork decreases the power meter which can be refilled by collecting cork gun items. Additionally, the hobby horse allows Mickey and Minnie to use the move Desperado Dash, which sends them flying through the air but drains the power meter slightly.

=== Game Boy Advance remake ===
The Great Circus Mystery Starring Mickey & Minnie was re-released in 2003 under the title Disney's Magical Quest 2 Starring Mickey & Minnie. The password feature in the original game was replaced with a save feature in the remake. No mini-games were added to this version, but the main adventure could be played by two players using the GBA link cable promo featured on the DVD Mickey, Donald, Goofy: The Three Musketeers Sneak Peeks.

=== Reception ===
Reception

Aggregate score
Aggregator	Score
GameRankings	74.75% (SNES)

Review scores
Publication	Score
Electronic Gaming Monthly	7.4 out of 10 (Genesis)
Famitsu	26 out of 40 (SNES)
GamePro	4.3 out of 5 (Genesis)
IGN	5 out of 10 (GBA)
Next Generation	2 out of 5 (Genesis)
Nintendo Power	3.5 out of 5 (SNES)
Super Play	73% (SNES)

The Great Circus Mystery Starring Mickey & Minnie received mixed to positive reviews. As with the previous game in the series, the easy difficulty and length of the game were criticized while the colourful graphics, outfit system and music received mostly praise. The new co-operative gameplay feature was considered to be one of the game's greatest strengths. On the negative side, some critics noted that The Great Circus Mystery was very similar to the previous game. Much like the first game in the series, the game was mostly recommended for younger players. The GBA version was criticized for not pushing the system's limits and for not providing any new features beside link cable support. Since the SNES version was introduced closely to Mickey Mania, another SNES video game with Mickey Mouse in the title role, both games were compared to each other to a certain extent.^{[c]}

On release, Famicom Tsūshin scored the game a 26 out of 40. Next Generation reviewed the Genesis version of the game, rating it two stars out of five, and stated that "compared to Sony Imagesoft's Mickey Mania, The Great Circus Mystery is just a great big disappointment".

== Disney's Magical Quest 3 Starring Mickey & Donald ==
Disney's Magical Quest 3 Starring Mickey & Donald
- Front cover of North American GBA version
- Developer: Sun L (Note: Ported to Game Boy Advance by Klein Computer Entertainment)
- Publisher: Capcom
- Platforms: Super Famicom; Game Boy Advance
- Release: Super Famicom version: JP: December 8, 1995; GBA version: JP: November 21, 2003; EU: March 19, 2004; NA: June 14, 2005
- Genre: Platformer
- Modes: Single-player; Two-player cooperative Two-player competitive (GBA)

The final game in the series was released for the Super Famicom only in Japan. It was later re-released for the Game Boy Advance, the first version of the game to be released outside of Japan. In Disney's Magical Quest 3 Starring Mickey & Donald, Mickey Mouse and Donald Duck try to save Donald's nephews from King Pete. It features four outfits and seven levels. Unlike the two earlier games in the series, an outfit now behaves differently depending on whether Mickey or Donald are wearing it.

=== Story ===
While hiding in the attic from their uncle Donald Duck, Huey, Dewey and Louie discover an old book. The book, soon revealed to be enchanted, transports the triplets to Storybook Land. There, they are captured by its tyrannical ruler, King Pete, who plots to later conquer the real world. Mickey and Donald are told what happened by the fairy of Storybook Land and therefore decide to enter the book in order to find the duckling brothers and stop Pete once more.

=== Changes ===
The game is quite similar to Disney's Magical Quest 2, though with some new features. There is a cartridge save feature instead of the password system in the previous game. Additionally, some outfits the game introduces have different properties to both Mickey and Donald. By finding secret doors scattered through the levels, bonus rooms can be found. These allow the player to pick a playing card, and if they guess correctly a reward is given.

The Game Boy Advance version allows two players to play together with a GBA link cable cooperatively as well as in some competitive mini-games.

=== Outfits ===
As stated, some outfits feature different abilities depending on whether Mickey or Donald is wearing them. Some outfits can be upgraded in stores found throughout the game.

As with the two previous games in the series, the default outfit allows Mickey and Donald to grab certain enemies and blocks and spin them away. The first unlockable costume for Mickey is a medieval knight's armour, including a shield and a lance with a boxing glove on the end. Due to its weight the armour sinks in water, but the shield can protect Mickey from attacks and the lance allows him to attack in four different directions. Donald uses a wooden barrel as armour, a metal bowl for a helmet and wields a hammer as his weapon. Unlike Mickey's armour the barrel allows Donald to float in water and he can also duck into the barrel for cover and roll around, both of which can also be used as a platform for Mickey to stand on in 2-player mode. Donald swings his hammer in an arc. Both costumes have a bar that charges over time, increasing the damage of their next attack.

The second unlockable costume is the lumberjack climbing gear. It can be used to catch enemies and spin-throw them and climb trees. The final outfit is a magician outfit. It allows Mickey and Donald to cast spells with which they can find secret areas, transform enemies and avoid traps. Donald's costume, in which he holds a magical lamp, can summon a genie hand which can be used as a platform for Mickey to stand on in 2-player mode.

=== Reception ===
Reception

Aggregate score
Aggregator	Score
Metacritic	58/100

Review scores
Publication	Score
1Up.com	C+ (GBA)
Famitsu	7/10, 6/10, 7/10, 6/10
GameSpy	3/5 (GBA)
Nintendo World Report	5/10 (GBA)

The Game Boy Advance version of Disney's Magical Quest 3 Starring Mickey & Donald received mixed reviews. As with the other games in the series, the graphics and animations were praised while the length and easy difficulty was criticized. The new outfit system with different outfits for Mickey and Donald was well received by critics, and alongside the cooperative-gameplay feature many critics found it added a new dimension to the game.^{[d]}

== See also ==
- List of Disney video games
