= Disney Sports Enterprises =

Disney Sports Enterprises may refer to:

- Anaheim Sports, the original Disney Sports Enterprises which owned two professional sports teams in Anaheim
- Disney Sports Enterprises, formerly called Disney Sports Attractions, which runs ESPN Wide World of Sports Complex and other Disney sports initiatives primarily runDisney
- Sports, also referred to as ESPN, one of the primary business segments of the Walt Disney Company
