= Fantasia (video game) =

1991 video game

- European cover art
- Developer: Infogrames
- Publisher: Sega
- Designers: Didier Chanfray, Jean-Jacques Poncet, Philippe Agripnidis
- Programmers: Richard Bottet, Thibault Lepoutre
- Artist: Didier Chanfray
- Composer: Frederic Metzen
- Series: Fantasia
- Platform: Genesis
- Release: NA: August 1991; EU: 1991; JP: November 22, 1991
- Genre: Platform
- Mode: Single-player

Fantasia (Note: Japanese: ファンタジア ミッキーマウス・マジック Hepburn: Fantajia mikkīmausu majikku (lit. Fantasia: Mickey Mouse Magic)) is a 1991 platform game developed by Infogrames and published by Sega for the Genesis. It was loosely based on the 1940 animated film Fantasia and inspired by the success of the 1990 video game Castle of Illusion Starring Mickey Mouse.

== Gameplay ==
The player controls Mickey Mouse as the Sorcerer's Apprentice through various side-scrolling levels in an attempt to collect musical notes that went missing while he was asleep. The four levels are based on amalgamations of the segments of Fantasia, with each one themed around the elements: water (The Sorcerer's Apprentice, Dance of the Hours), earth (The Rite of Spring, The Sorcerer's Apprentice), air (Pastoral Symphony, The Sorcerer's Apprentice, Russian Dance, Dance of the Hours) and fire (Night on Bald Mountain, Toccata and Fugue in D Minor). The player defeats various enemies by jumping on them or by collecting magical bubbles that can be used to shoot at enemies as projectiles. In each level, the player collects a certain number of hidden magical notes for the song to play once again.

== Development ==
Sega announced a Fantasia game in January 1990, inspired by both the success of Castle of Illusion Starring Mickey Mouse and the 50th anniversary of the eponymous 1940 film. Given the Castle of Illusion team was busy with QuackShot, Sega had to outsource Fantasia to a third party developer. French company Infogrames won the bid, working under Sega producers Scott Berfield and Stephan L. Butler, who wanted to ensure a faithful adaptation. Designer and art director Didier Chantrey led a team of nine people, six assigned to the graphics, who lacked experience in developing for consoles, having only worked in modest computer games without such a big license attached.

With pressure toward the holiday shopping rush and from the mid-year release of Sonic the Hedgehog, time to develop the game was tight, with everything needing to be done in six months. It was difficult to replicate the animation and music quality of the film to the 16-bit console, with Chantrey noting most of his time was spent handling graphic assets with the artistic team, rather than testing the gameplay. Chantrey's duties included animating Mickey, level design, and creating the menus. The developers struggled to come up with game mechanics that Disney would approve. During the last three weeks of development, the crew were flown to Sega of America's offices in San Francisco to work closer to the producers and testers. By the final day, with the Infogrames staff having already returned to France, Berfield himself had to edit the hex code to finish the ROM and send to Sega's Japanese headquarters for manufacturing. By May 1991, Sega presented Fantasia at the Consumer Electronics Show and soon was showcased at the Tec Toy launch. Berfield said the game wound not appearing in Sega's other consoles because they "were rapidly moving away from the Master System by then" and "only wanted to port big sellers to the Game Gear."

With no time to tweak the gameplay, Fantasia was shipped for the holiday season. Sega's head of product development Ken Belthaser noted that the publisher "need[ed] games in the pipeline, especially big licenses", but came to regret the decision of a rushed release, saying "the game was just simply unplayable" and the gameplay issues could have been solved with two extra months of development. Berfield said that while he liked the graphics and thought the music was as good as it could given hardware limitations, "I do wish we could have made it more fun". Chantrey stated that "I never forgot the sluggish controls and the randomness of the collisions", and came to conclude "you really should not release a game when it's not finished". The release of Fantasia was met with complaints by Roy E. Disney, who had made a promise to his uncle Walt that Fantasia adaptions would not be made. The licensing turned out to have been granted in error. Sales of the game were to stop, each of the approximately 5,000 unsold copies was to be destroyed, and every advertisement about the game was to be removed.

== Reception ==
Reception

Review scores
Publication	Score
Electronic Gaming Monthly	6/10, 6/10, 5/10, 6/10
MegaTech	49%
Mega	11%
Mega Action	80%
Console XS	81%
Mega Play	18/40
Mean Machines	61%

The game was poorly received, with MegaTech magazine saying the game was "a massive disappointment. Poorly designed, bland and frustrating, with very little appeal". Mean Machines said that although appearing impressive at first with "excellent sprites and gorgeous backdrops, the gameplay is badly flawed and there are several highly annoying features that make the action frustrating". Mega Play's four reviewers gave average to below average review, they unanimously praised the graphics and animations but also criticized the gameplay as choppy, substandard, and awkward. Mega Action gave an overall score of 80% and praised the cartoon-like animation and criticized the games difficulty set far too high. Console XS initially praised the graphics as "astounding" and the animation and scrolling as "superb". They criticized the game saying: "This game is full of poor collision detection, frustrating restart points, and repetitive gameplay. Very, very tough". The four reviewers of Electronic Gaming Monthly gave average reviews praising the graphics, animation, and game music. They criticized the controls and gameplay as repetitive, clunky, and unpredictable, and said that Fantasia does not measure up to Castle of Illusion.

Mega placed the game at #6 in its list of the 10 Worst Mega Drive Games of All Time.

== See also ==
- List of Disney video games
