= Mickey's 123: The Big Surprise Party =

1990 video game

- Developer: Distinctive Software
- Publishers: NA: Disney Software; EU: Infogrames
- Platforms: Amiga, DOS
- Release: October 1990
- Genre: Educational
- Mode: Single-player

Mickey's 123: The Big Surprise Party, also known as Mickey 123: L'Anniversaire Surprise in French, is an educational game that was released on Amiga and DOS, developed by Distinctive Software and published by Disney Software in the United States and Infogrames in Europe. The game stars Mickey Mouse throwing a party for his friends. The game is designed for children 2 to 5 years old.

== Plot ==
The game opens with Mickey sleeping in a chair in his living room. Once the player has pressed one of the keys numbered one to nine, Mickey will count that number of sheep before waking up and announcing that he will throw a surprise birthday party for one of his friends: Goofy, Daisy Duck, Minnie Mouse, Donald Duck, Scrooge McDuck, Horace Horsecollar, Clarabelle Cow, Chip and Dale, or Gus Goose.

Mickey wanders into the street and can go to the toy factory to make a present, the grocery store to buy food, and the post office to invite his other friends. Mickey can walk to these locations or, by pressing number keys, use a wheeled form of transportation.

Once all three places have been visited, Mickey heads back home to decorate his house for the party. The guests arrive to surprise the friend the party is for before being served the food. The game ends with the guests dancing out of the house and Mickey going back to sleep.
