= Mickey's Adventures in Numberland =

1994 video game

- Developer: Beam Software
- Publisher: Hi Tech Expressions
- Designers: James Halprin; Wayne Simmons
- Composer: Marshall Parker
- Series: Mickey Mouse
- Platform: NES
- Release: NA: March 1994
- Genre: Edutainment
- Mode: Single-player

Mickey's Adventures in Numberland (referred as Mickey's Adventure in Numberland on its cover) is an educational Nintendo Entertainment System game starring Disney's Mickey Mouse.

== Gameplay ==
Mickey must collect all of the numbers from one to ten in order to prevent the evil Pete from completely robbing Numberland. The five levels are: Number City, Number Factory, Space Center, Number Museum and Pete's Hideout. Basic math questions must be answered in order to progress to the next level. There are three difficulty levels, players can only "die" on the hardest difficulty level. The player is given balls of bubblegum to be used against enemies as a weapon.

== See also ==
- List of Disney video games
