= QuackShot =

1991 platform video game

QuackShot Starring Donald Duck
- Developer: Sega
- Publisher: Sega
- Director: Emiko Yamamoto
- Programmers: Hiroshi Momota; Masato Omori; Keiichi Yamamoto
- Artist: Takashi Yuda
- Composer: Shigenori Kamiya
- Platforms: Sega Genesis, Sega Saturn
- Release: Genesis: NA: November 1991; EU: December 1991; JP: December 20, 1991; Saturn: JP: October 15, 1998
- Genres: Platform, metroidvania
- Mode: Single-player

QuackShot Starring Donald Duck, known in Japan as I Love Donald Duck: The Treasure of King Garuzia, (Note: Japanese: アイラブドナルドダック グルジア王の秘宝, Hepburn: Ai Rabu Donarudo Dakku Gurujia-ō no Hihō) (Note: The game's Japanese title screen, box art, and instruction manual feature the English QuackShot title; the former as QuackShot: The Treasure of King Garuzia (Japanese: QuackShot グルジア王の秘宝, Hepburn: QuackShot Gurujia-ō no Hihō) and the latter two separately from the full title. However, the game is commonly cited by Japanese third-party sources with the I Love Donald Duck wording of the title.) is a 1991 platform game developed and published by Sega for the Sega Genesis. The player controls Donald Duck as he, alongside his three nephews Huey, Dewey and Louie, tries to track down a lost artifact treasured by King Garuzia. The game was influenced by the Indiana Jones film series.

QuackShot was released with a positive response from video game publications. The game was universally lauded for its graphics, with magazines like Sega Pro describing them as "some of the best graphics around". It was also praised for its music and puzzles. Conversely, the game was criticized for its overall difficulty and controls in certain situations. Retrospectively, QuackShot was also criticized for its lack of speech samples by IGN.

== Gameplay ==
Donald traverses platforms in a level modeled after Mexico. The player's health is signified by the number of hearts in the lower-left corner.

The player, as Donald, ventures through a variety of side-scrolling levels. Generally, each level is divided into an overland part and a dungeon, such as the Maharajah's palace or the temple in which the Great Duck Treasure resides. Although the player may choose any order to play the overland sections, various obstacles prevent the player from entering the dungeons outside a specific order. In addition, some levels provide the player vital clues that solve puzzles needed to progress in later sections. Once Donald has completed the overland section of an area, he may leave by calling his nephews' biplane and will return to the dungeon entrance of that area if the player chooses to return.

Donald is armed with a special gun that can shoot plungers, popcorn or bubble gum. Donald has unlimited plungers which can temporarily stun enemies (though bosses can still be damaged with plungers), and can collect popcorn and gum along the way or get the latter from Gyro Gearloose. Later in the game, the plunger is upgraded to act as a temporary platform to climb walls with and, when stuck to a passing bird, allows Donald to traverse longer distances. In the overland sections of Duckburg, India, and Egypt, Donald can also pick up chilli peppers which increase his temper, eventually temporarily activating a "quack attack" mode that allows him to become invincible, automatically run forward and knock out enemies in his path.

== Plot ==
While Donald Duck is combing through his uncle's library, an incomplete map falls out of a book relating to the treasure of King Garuzia, the ruler of a kingdom from ancient times. The map leads to the king's most prized possession, which was hidden away shortly before his death. Donald, thinking this could lead to riches, teams up with his nephews Huey, Dewey, and Louie to search for the treasure, completely disregarding his girlfriend Daisy's concerns. However, Donald's rival, Pete, overhears about the mission and sets out with his own team to obtain the treasure for himself.

Donald follows the incomplete map's directions until arriving in Transylvania, where he obtains the complete map from Count Dracula's castle. Now with the complete map, Donald continues his journey until he reaches a Viking ship, which supposedly contains an old diary with the secret to locating the treasure. Upon contending with the undead Vikings on the ship, Donald learns the diary is not within the ship but near the South Pole. He travels to the Pole and finds the diary, but upon obtaining it Donald's nephews are temporarily held for ransom by Pete for the book. Donald gives Pete the diary, then gives chase to Pete's hideout and manages to get the book back, defeating Pete in the process. After following the diary's writings and subsequently the final directions, Donald manages to find the treasure, which is revealed to be an ordinary stone statue. Disappointed, Donald returns home with the statue; however upon accidentally being broken by his nephews it is revealed that it holds a golden jeweled necklace. Donald gives the necklace to Daisy and the two walk away into the sunset together.

== Development and release ==
QuackShot was developed and published by Sega for the Sega Genesis. In May 1991, Sega presented the game at the Consumer Electronics Show. The game was released in North America on November 1991, in Europe a month later, and in Japan on December 20, 1991. QuackShot was released as part of a bundle called The Disney Collection for Genesis in 1996 alongside Castle of Illusion. The game was also ported to the Sega Saturn and released exclusively in Japan alongside Castle of Illusion again as part of the Sega Ages series in 1998, entitled Sega Ages: I Love Mickey Mouse.

== Reception ==
=== Contemporary ===
Reception

Aggregate score
Aggregator	Score
GameRankings	77/100

Review scores
Publication	Score
Computer and Video Games	89/100
Electronic Gaming Monthly	8/10, 8/10, 6/10, 6/10
Famitsu	6/10, 6/10, 6/10, 6/10
IGN	7.3/10
Console XS	92/100
MegaTech	82/100
Sega-16	8/10
Sega Pro	95/100

In the United Kingdom, QuackShot was the top-selling Mega Drive game upon release.

QuackShot received a positive response from critics upon release. Paul Rand of Computer and Video Games magazine praised the graphics and gameplay, but noted its slower pace compared to action games. MegaTech magazine also praised the graphics and gameplay, but criticized the lack of difficulty. Console XS magazine called it one of the "best games for the Mega Drive." Damian Butt from Sega Pro gave it a 95% score, praising the graphics and puzzles, explaining that "[e]ven if the ideas are not original, the way they are strung together to accelerate the pace to overload is nothing short of breath-taking". That said, he had several criticisms, including Donald's controls in certain situations, the difficulty of some levels and puzzles, and "the number of credits" that make the game seem easy with unlimited continues, but noted that the player will "still need considerable skill to reach the treasure island". Ultimately, he said that "[y]ounger players will instantly be enthralled by Donald's quest" and that "QuackShot is everything a cartoon game should be and more".

Entertainment Weekly gave the game an A and wrote: "What does this action game have in common with classic 1950s Disney cartoons? The completely deranged hero. During the Donald's 'quack attacks', the feathers practically fly off the screen and into your lap".

=== Retrospective ===
GameRankings, an aggregator for video game reviews, assigned the game a score of 77% based on two retrospective reviews from Sega-16 and IGN. Sega-16 scored it eight out of ten.

Levi Buchanan from IGN gave QuackShot a 7.3/10, lauding the graphics and animation as excellent, and saying the music was pleasing. He criticized the controls, calling them "float-y" and noted the difficulty in executing precision jumps, explaining that "[i]t's far too easy to over- or under-shoot a narrow column and slip to your doom". He was also disappointed with the lack of speech samples, explaining that it's "a bit of a drag with a character that is so defined by his voice". Buchanan summed up the game as being a "good platformer tripped up by some questionable controls" and recommended the game as "a mildly enjoyable 16-bit platformer that would fit nicely in your Genesis collection".

In a 2011 review for Hardcore Gaming 101, Audun Sorlie called it “not only one of the best Disney games ever made, but one of the best platformers on the Genesis as a whole”. He highlighted the influence of the Indiana Jones series, itself inspired in part by Carl Barks's Donald Duck comics, as well as the engaging “semilinear” gameplay, detailed graphics, smooth animations, and the “glorious soundtrack.”

In 1992, Mega placed the game at #7 in their "Top Mega Drive Games of All Time" list. In 2017, GamesRadar ranked the game 28th on its "Best Sega Genesis/Mega Drive Games of All Time".

== See also ==
- World of Illusion
- Illusion (video game series)
- List of Disney video games
