= Disney's Party =

2002 video game

- North American GameCube cover art
- Developers: Neverland (GameCube); Jupiter Corporation (GBA)
- Publishers: JP: Hudson Soft (GCN); JP: Tomy (GBA); WW: Electronic Arts
- Platforms: GameCube; Game Boy Advance
- Release: GameCube: JP: August 1, 2002; NA: September 16, 2003; PAL: October 17, 2003; Game Boy Advance: NA: September 16, 2003; PAL: October 10, 2003; JP: April 10, 2004
- Genre: Party
- Modes: Single-player, multiplayer

Disney's Party (Note: Known in Japan as Disney's Magical Park (Japanese: ディズニーのマジカルパーク, Hepburn: Dizunī no Majikaru Pāku) for GameCube and Mickey's Pocket Resort (Japanese: ミッキーのポケットリゾート, Hepburn: Mikkī no Poketto Rizōto) for Game Boy Advance.) is a party video game, developed by Neverland for the GameCube and by Jupiter Corporation for the Game Boy Advance. The games are much like the games of the Hudson Soft-produced Mario Party series, in which the player competes in mini-games to win the game.

== Gameplay ==
The gameplay in this game is much different from other games of its kind. In starting the game, there are only up to 4 different choices. The player then votes on these choices, the more votes a game receives the more it increases the chance of the spinner landing on it. Whatever game the spinner lands on is then played. Similar to the popular Mario Party series, the players play on a game board, which features an item shop stocked with items for use on the board's spaces. In order to win the game, they must advance and land on the flag where it says destination. They have to play another minigame to win the park. When winning the most parks they advance to a boss stage. Upon the boss' defeat, the game is over and the credits appear. There are a total of six playable characters: Mickey Mouse, Donald Duck, Minnie Mouse, Daisy Duck, Goofy, and an exclusive new character named Billy.

== Reception ==
Reception

Aggregate scores
| Aggregator | Score | |
| Aggregator | GBA | GameCube |
|---|---|---|
| GameRankings | 40.3% | 37.4% |
| Metacritic | N/A | 39/100 |

Review scores
| Publication | Score | |
| Publication | GBA | GameCube |
|---|---|---|
| Famitsu | N/A | 31/40 |
| IGN | 4.0/10 | 5.2/10 |

The game received "generally unfavorable" reviews from critics, Metacritic gave the GameCube version a score of 39 out of 100, based on three reviews. Game Rankings gave the Game Boy Advance version a 40.3%, while the GameCube version was given a 37.4%. IGN gave the GameCube version a 5.2 out of 10, saying, "Is the kingdom able to retain its magic?". They gave the Game Boy Advance version a 4 out of 10, writing: "If this is a party, someone forgot to bring the chips and beer".
