= Castle of Illusion Starring Mickey Mouse (2013 video game) =

2013 video game

- Developer: Sega Studios Australia
- Publisher: Sega (Note: Published by Disney Mobile for iOS/Android/Windows 8/Windows Phone, and by Feral Interactive for OS X)
- Composers: Shigenori Kamiya, Grant Kirkhope (arranger and additional music)
- Series: Illusion
- Platforms: PlayStation 3, Windows, Xbox 360, iOS, Windows Phone, Android, OS X
- Release: September 3, 2013: PlayStation 3; NA: September 3, 2013; WW: September 4, 2013 Windows, Xbox 360 September 4, 2013 iOS November 21, 2013 Windows Phone May 27, 2014 Android June 18, 2014 OS X July 24, 2014
- Genre: Platform
- Mode: Single-player

Castle of Illusion Starring Mickey Mouse is a 2013 2.5D platform game developed by Sega Studios Australia and published by Sega. The game is a remake of the original 1990 Sega Genesis/Sega Mega Drive video game of the same name, which was the first title in the Illusion series of Mickey Mouse video games. The game was released on PlayStation 3, Windows and Xbox 360, in September 2013, and later for iOS, Windows Phone, Android and OS X.

== Gameplay ==
Following the same style of gameplay as the original Mega Drive/Genesis title, presented in high-definition 3D graphics, the game is largely played as a side-scrolling platformer like its predecessor, although some sections allow Mickey Mouse to move in multiple directions, such as puzzle segments. Mickey's main offensive ability is his bounce attack, which he can use to bounce on enemies and reach higher areas. He can also collect projectiles which he can throw at long distance enemies. Levels are re-envisioned versions of the original game's levels now separated into three acts, featuring new layouts, puzzles and enemies, as well as enhanced boss fights. The castle itself, which was merely a transition in the original game, can now be fully explored, with new areas opened up by collecting numerous gems littered around each level. Throughout the game, players can find playing cards and chilli peppers that can be used to unlock various outfits for Mickey.

== Plot ==
As in the 1990 original, the game casts players in the role of Mickey Mouse who must fight his way through the Castle of Illusion to rescue Minnie Mouse from the evil witch Mizrabel who wants to steal her youth and beauty.

Obstacles include enchanted forests, rebellious toys and mazes of living books.

== Development and release ==
The Castle of Illusion remake was teased by Sega in April 2013 and was announced later that month. The game was developed by Sega Studios Australia, their last game before the studio was shut down, under the supervision of the original game's director, Emiko Yamamoto. The game features a remastered soundtrack arranged by Grant Kirkhope, as well as an option to listen to the original soundtrack composed by Shigenori Kamiya. The game also features full voice acting for Mickey, as well as narration by Richard McGonagle. Both Mickey's and the Narrator's scripts were written by Dean Wilkinson. From September 2016 up until March 2017, the game was delisted from the Steam, Xbox Live and PlayStation Network stores.

Players who pre-ordered the game on PlayStation Network were able to download the original Genesis game, as well as a theme and custom avatars.

== Reception ==
Reception

Aggregate score
Aggregator	Score			
Aggregator	iOS	PC	PS3	Xbox 360
Metacritic	81/100	69/100	72/100	67/100

Review scores
Publication	Score			
Publication	iOS	PC	PS3	Xbox 360
4Players	N/A	80%	80%	80%
Eurogamer	N/A	N/A	N/A	7/10
Game Informer	N/A	N/A	7/10	7/10
GameSpot	N/A	N/A	N/A	7/10
Gamezebo	4.5/5	N/A	N/A	N/A
Hardcore Gamer	N/A	N/A	N/A	3/5
IGN	N/A	N/A	N/A	6.7/10
Jeuxvideo.com	13/20	13/20	13/20	13/20
Joystiq	N/A	N/A	4/5	N/A
PlayStation Official Magazine – UK	N/A	N/A	7/10	N/A
Official Xbox Magazine (US)	N/A	N/A	N/A	8/10
Pocket Gamer	4.5/5	N/A	N/A	N/A
Polygon	N/A	N/A	N/A	7/10
TouchArcade	4/5	N/A	N/A	N/A
Digital Spy	3/5	N/A	N/A	4/5
Metro	N/A	N/A	N/A	5/10

The iOS version received "favorable" reviews, while the PC and console versions received "average" reviews, according to the review aggregation website Metacritic. IGN praised the Xbox 360 version's presentation while critiquing its slippery controls and a short length. Joystiq called the PlayStation 3 version "both a great remake and a showcase for the key elements that make a great platformer". GameSpot praised the Xbox 360 version's fun platforming while lamenting unskippable cutscenes. Official Xbox Magazine called the same console version "a fun update to yesteryear's classic, but also a solid platformer in its own right".
