= Mickey's Space Adventure =

1984 video game

- Developer: Sierra On-Line
- Publisher: Sierra On-Line
- Designer: Roberta Williams
- Artists: Mark Crowe; Doug MacNeill; Jennifer Nelsen; Terry Pierce
- Composer: Al Lowe
- Platforms: MS-DOS, Macintosh, Apple II, Commodore 64, TRS-80 Color Computer
- Release: December 1984
- Genre: Adventure
- Mode: Single-player

Mickey's Space Adventure is a graphic adventure game for a number of platforms. It was designed by Roberta Williams and released by Sierra On-Line in 1984. It features the Disney characters Mickey Mouse and Pluto.

== Plot ==
The plot involves an alien race losing a precious crystal that contains all of their recorded history, split into nine pieces and hidden throughout Earth's solar system. While out walking Pluto, Mickey Mouse stumbles upon a spaceship sent by the aliens and is charged with searching the planets (and several moons) for the pieces of the crystal.

== Development ==
Written in 1984 by Roberta Williams, the game was a joint project with Disney prior to their collaboration on The Black Cauldron. The game was intended for children. While there were several similar games featuring Disney characters, Mickey's Space Adventure is not considered part of a larger series. The PC version was released on two 360 KB 5¼" disks.

== See also ==
- List of Disney video games
