= Sorcerer's Apprentice (video game) =

1983 video game

- Developer: Atari, Inc.
- Publishers: Atari, Inc.
- Designer: Peter Niday
- Programmer: Peter Niday
- Composer: Robert Vieira
- Series: Fantasia
- Platform: Atari 2600
- Release: December 1983
- Genre: Tower defense
- Mode: Single-player

Sorcerer's Apprentice is a video game for the Atari 2600, based on a sequence from the film Fantasia.

== Gameplay ==
Sorcerer's Apprentice on the Atari 2600

The player plays as Mickey Mouse in two different screens of play. One screen has various objects falling from the sky and he has the ability to shoot something up at them and catch certain things. The second screen involves him rushing up and down stairs trying to intercept an army of walking brooms to stop them from getting to the bottom and causing the room to flood more.

== Reception ==
Randi Hacker for Electronic Fun with Computers & Games said: "Our only hypothesis is that it instills a healthy fear of brooms and cleaning paraphernalia which means that, when the kids who play this game grow up more people will need to be employed as maids".

Atari Age said that Sorcerer's Apprentice is a wonderful cartoon videogame treat for the whole family.

Video Games magazine said that "it's not a total disaster, but in light of the other child-oriented games recently released by Atari, especially Pigs in Space and Snoopy and the Red Baron, it is a disappointment". TV Gamer said that "not the most difficult game ever created but then it is designed for younger gamers. The graphics are pretty good and overall the game is to be recommended to young gamers and Walt Disney fans".

The Vid Kid's Book of Home Video Games gave the game an overall rating of B.
