= Mickey's Safari in Letterland =

1993 video game

- Developer: Beam Software
- Publisher: Hi Tech Expressions
- Series: Mickey Mouse
- Platform: Nintendo Entertainment System
- Release: NA: March 1993
- Genres: Edutainment, platformer
- Mode: Single-player

Mickey's Safari in Letterland is a 1993 educational Nintendo Entertainment System video game starring Disney's Mickey Mouse. This video game is intended for preschoolers and toddlers. Basic literacy skills are taught in this side-scrolling video game.

== Gameplay ==
Mickey's Safari in Letterland is an educational game that helps preschoolers develop alphabet recognition. Players join Mickey on a journey from the Yukon to the Caribbean, searching for letter tablets. The game features digitized speech to enhance the learning experience.

== Development ==
The game was originally scheduled to release before Christmas 1992.

== Reception ==
Reception

Review score
Publication	Score
All Game Guide	3.5/5

All Game Guide said "The graphics are simple but attractively cartoonish and the soundtrack helpfully includes Mickey speaking all 26 letters of the alphabet"

== See also ==
- List of Disney video games
