= Disney's Mickey Saves The Day 3D Adventure =

- Developer: Human Code
- Publisher: Disney Interactive
- Platform: Windows
- Release: October 3, 2000
- Genre: Adventure

Disney's Mickey Saves The Day 3D Adventure is a 2000 video game developed by Human Code and published by Disney Interactive.

== Gameplay ==
The player takes the role of Mickey or Minnie Mouse and moves through more than 25 locations in Mickey's hometown while completing a wide range of tasks. These tasks include everyday activities such as preparing a sandwich as well as helping Professor Von Drake assemble his flying machine. The game presents adjustable skill levels and incorporates lessons about cooperation, teamwork, and environmental awareness as the player progresses through its adventure structure.

== Reception ==
Reception

Review scores
Publication	Score
Absoluter Games	55%
Just Adventure	B
Jeuxvideo	9/20
Rockford Register Star	2/5
Review Corner	7.4/10

Rockford Register Star found Disney's Mickey Saves The Day 3D Adventure to fail to engage children, even with its wonderful graphics, animation and sound. The Birmingham News called Disney's Mickey Saves The Day 3D Adventure too hard for players.
