= Disney Magicboard Online =

2007 video game

- Developer: Shanda
- Publisher: The Walt Disney Company
- Platform: Microsoft Windows
- Release: CHN: December 10, 2007
- Genre: Racing

Disney Magicboard Online (迪士尼魔幻飞板) is an online racing game featuring Disney characters. This game was released only in China on December 10, 2007. It was developed by the Chinese game developer Shanda under license of The Walt Disney Company.

== Gameplay ==
Players control the magicboard by using the arrow keys on the keyboard. Players can choose from a variety of Disney characters, including: Mickey Mouse, Minnie Mouse, Goofy, Donald Duck, Daisy Duck, and Pluto.
