= Pop'n Music Mickey Tunes =

2000 video game

- Developer: Konami
- Publisher: Konami
- Series: Pop 'n Music
- Platforms: Arcade, Game Boy Color, PlayStation
- Release: Arcade: JP: 2000; Game Boy Color, PlayStation: JP: November 22, 2000
- Genre: Dance
- Modes: Single-player, multiplayer

Pop'n Music Mickey Tunes is a musical video game published by Konami for several platforms in 2000. The game is a Mickey Mouse and Disney-themed installment of Konami's Pop'n Music franchise. The game was released for arcades in 2000, and then ported to the PlayStation (as Pop'n Music Disney Tunes) and the Game Boy Color (as Pop'n Music GB Disney Tunes) in November 2000.

== Gameplay ==
Disney Tunes plays identically to other titles in the Pop'n Music series, with the player having to tap on the bundled-controller in synchronization with the music and gain a high-enough meter to pass to the next song. The Game Boy Color version runs on the same game engine as Pop'n Music GB. The game's fourteen songs, excluding "D.D.D.!", are all Japanese covers of existing Disney songs.
