= Disney Sports Soccer =

2002 video game

- North American GameCube cover art
- Developer: Konami Computer Entertainment Osaka
- Publisher: Konami
- Producer: Luigi G. Priore
- Designers: Shōichi Maekawa; Tetsurou Eguchi; Atsushi Sasakura; Hideki Koide
- Programmers: Masahiro Yamamoto; Hideki Yanagihara; Yoshito Ohara; Takashi Kamio; Kenji Masakane; Kenta Amano; Takuya Miyamoto; Hiroyuki Shinki
- Composer: Nobuyuki Akena
- Platforms: Game Boy Advance, GameCube
- Release: Game Boy Advance: JP: July 18, 2002; NA: November 5, 2002; UK: July 11, 2003; GameCube: JP: July 18, 2002; NA: November 12, 2002; UK: February 7, 2003; AU: February 21, 2003
- Genre: Sports (soccer)
- Modes: Single-player, multiplayer

Disney Sports Soccer, (Note: Japanese: ディズニースポーツ：サッカー, Hepburn: Dizunī Supōtsu: Sakkā) known as Disney Sports Football in Europe, is a pair of 2002 sports video games released by Konami, one for the GameCube, and the other for the Game Boy Advance.

== Teams ==
- The Superstars (captain: Mickey Mouse, teammates: cats, jersey: blue)
- The Charmers (captain: Minnie Mouse, teammates: bunnies, jersey: red)
- The Seaducks (captain: Donald Duck, teammates: white roosters, jersey: vertical teal and navy stripes)
- The Belles (captain: Daisy Duck, teammates: brown roosters, jersey: lilac with purple trim)
- The Spacenuts (captain: Goofy, teammates: dalmatians, jersey: green)
- The Steamrollers (captain: Pete, teammates: pigs, jersey: orange)
- The Imperials (captain: Mortimer Mouse, teammates: mongrels, jersey: purple with gold trim)
- The Wolfgangs (captain: Big Bad Wolf, teammates: wolves, jersey: burgundy with black trim)
- The TinyRockets (Huey, Dewey, and Louie & José Carioca)
- Mickey's All-Stars (Mickey, Minnie, Donald, Daisy and Goofy)
- Pete's All-Stars (Pete, Mortimer and Big Bad Wolf)

== Reception ==
Reception

Aggregate score
Aggregator	Score	
Aggregator	GBA	GameCube
Metacritic	68/100	75/100

Review scores
Publication	Score	
Publication	GBA	GameCube
Famitsu	23/40	29/40
Game Informer	N/A	8/10
GameSpot	6.7/10	7/10
GameSpy	3.5/5	N/A
IGN	N/A	8.1/10
Jeuxvideo.com	N/A	12/20
Nintendo Power	3.3/5	3.7/5
Nintendo World Report	5/10	8.5/10

The GameCube version received "generally favorable reviews", while the Game Boy Advance version received "average" reviews, according to the review aggregation website Metacritic. In Japan, Famitsu gave it a score of 29 out of 40 for the GameCube version, and 23 out of 40 for the GBA version.
