= Legend of Illusion Starring Mickey Mouse =

1995 video game

- European Game Gear cover art
- Developer: Aspect
- Publishers: Sega; Tec Toy (Master System)
- Directors: Katsuhiro Hasegawa; Hisayoshi Yoshida
- Producers: Motoshige Hokoyama; Mike Larsen; Patrick Gilmore
- Designers: Eiji Ikuta; Yuichiro Yokoyama; Eiji Taki
- Programmers: Tatsuo Matsuda; Yoshiki Matsushima
- Artists: Takako Kawaguchi; Hisato Fukumoto; Nobuhiko Honda; Hisakazu Kato
- Composers: Yayoi Fujimori; Kayoko Maeda; Shigenori Kamiya
- Series: Illusion
- Platforms: Game Gear, Master System
- Release: Game Gear: JP: January 13, 1995; NA: January 1995; EU: February 1995; Master System: BRA: December 1998
- Genre: Platform game
- Mode: Single-player

Legend of Illusion Starring Mickey Mouse (Note: Released in Japan as Mickey Mouse: Densetsu no Oukoku (ミッキーマウス 伝説の王国)) is a 1995 platform video game developed by Aspect and published by Sega. It was released for the Game Gear in 1995, with a Master System version released in Brazil at the end of 1998.

== Plot ==
A dark shadow has struck the land and King Pete is told by the advisor that only a king can find the legendary water of life to heal the land. The cowardly Pete makes Mickey, a laundry boy, an honorary king. Reluctant at first, Mickey sets off to save the kingdom.

== Gameplay ==
Unlike the other two Master System/Game Gear Illusion games, Mickey defeats enemies by throwing bars of soap (and later rocks) to defeat them rather than by bouncing on them. Frequently, there are puzzles that need to be solved to progress through the stages. One of the stages is a scrolling shooter. If all gems are collected in the final level, the player is rewarded with an alternative ending after King Pete is defeated.

== Reception ==
Game Gear review scores

Review scores
Publication	Score
Electronic Gaming Monthly	8/10, 7/10, 7/10, 8/10
Famitsu	6/10, 8/10, 7/10, 4/10
Computer and Video Games	75%

Reviewing the Game Gear version, GamePro mildly criticized the sounds, the lack of challenge, and the Game Gear's limited controls, but praised the "Disney quality" graphics and concluded the game to be "worth playing". The four reviewers of Electronic Gaming Monthly commented on the impressive graphics (particularly the "crisp" colors), the solid controls and playability, and general fun of the game. Ed Semrad concluded, "It seems that the programmers took some time on this one. Action gamers and Disney fans alike should check out this outstanding game."

== See also ==
- List of Disney video games
- List of Sega video game franchises
