= Deep Duck Trouble Starring Donald Duck =

1993 video game

- North American and European cover art
- Developer: Aspect
- Publisher: Sega
- Composer: Saori Kobayashi
- Platforms: Master System, Game Gear
- Release: Game Gear: JP: December 17, 1993; NA: 1993; EU: January 1994; Master System: EU: January 1994
- Genre: Platform
- Mode: Single-player

Deep Duck Trouble Starring Donald Duck, known in Japan as The Four Treasures of Donald Duck, (Note: Japanese: ドナルドダックの4つの秘宝, Hepburn: Donarudo Dakku no Fō Tsu no Takaramono) is a 1993 platform game developed by Aspect and published by Sega for the Game Gear and Master System. Based on the Walt Disney Company's Donald Duck franchise, the game follows titular anthropomorphic duck as he goes on a journey to save his uncle from a mysterious curse making him inflate like a balloon.

The gameplay consists of the player going through five linear side-scrolling levels, each broken into two parts, with the goal is to reach a treasure at the end. Many of the gameplay mechanics have similarities to previous licensed Disney video games.

== Gameplay ==
Donald Duck, the player character, kicking a box at a python enemy in Jungle Stage Area 2. The upper left corner of the screen displays how many lives ("tries") the player has left. The bottom left corner displays how much health the player currently has.

Deep Duck Trouble is a 2D side-scrolling platform game in which the player controls Donald Duck. The game is reminiscent of both DuckTales (video game) and Castle of Illusion Starring Mickey Mouse, as the two games share similar gameplay elements with the former.

The game has a total of five courses which, excluding the final course, can be completed in any order the player chooses. The player selects their course through a level select on a map. The majority of gameplay takes place in 2D side-scrolling linear levels, containing obstacles, enemies and assorted platforming challenges, which involve traversing the stage by running, jumping, dodging or defeating enemies. Each level is split up into two areas, each a branching part of the same core stage. At the end of stages a boss battle will occur and if the boss is defeated A treasure can be collected to then end the level. The player starts the game with three lives (referred to in the game as tries), which are lost if Donald's health is fully depleted. Additional lives can be earned or regained through life-ups found sparingly throughout stages. If all the players lives are lost the game ends, although the player can choose to continue their game back on the level select screen by selecting "Continue".

Donald's primary means of attacking enemies are by jumping on them or kicking a box at them. Certain boxes, modeled as a treasure chest, contain power-ups such as health-ups, items that increase your score or a chili pepper power-up, which automatically makes Donald run forward, destroying any enemies or boxes that it come across for a limited time.

== Plot ==
On an uncharted island, a priceless golden amulet was hidden away and forgotten about until Scrooge McDuck comes across an old map stating the location of it. Scrooge sets off on a treasure hunt to the island where he finds the amulet in a shrine and brings it back home with him. However, the amulet is secretly cursed so when he returns he inflates like a balloon. After seeing Scrooge's condition, Huey, Dewey and Louie call Donald for assistance. When Donald arrives he is informed about the problem from his nephews and Scrooge who asks that he return the amulet to the island in order to undo the curse. Donald accepts and before he sets off on his journey is given Scrooge's adventure diary as a means of assistance.

Donald arrives on the island via boat and realizes, through an entry in Scrooge's adventure diary, that he must collect four treasures and cast them into a sacred lake in order for the shrine to reveal itself. Donald does just that and the shrine reveals itself from the lake. Donald goes into the shrine and, after dealing with the trials within, returns the amulet back to its original place. After Donald places the amulet back a crown appears before him; without hesitation he takes it back home with him. Upon returning home Donald learns that the curse has been lifted and Scrooge is back to his old self. When Scrooge learns that Donald had taken the crown back with him he scolds Donald telling him that the crown is likely to be cursed just like the amulet. The game ends with Donald in the same predicament as Scrooge was and Scrooge, Huey, Dewey and Louie walking off into the sunset with Donald in tow ready to go on another adventure back to the island to help with Donald's curse.

== Release ==
In February 21, 2001, Majesco announced plans to re-release Deep Duck Trouble alongside a re-launch of the Game Gear system, with both releasing later that same year.

== Reception ==
Reception

Review scores
Publication	Score	
Publication	Game Gear	Master System
Electronic Gaming Monthly	8/10, 8/10, 7/10, 7/10, 7/10	N/A
Jeuxvideo.com	N/A	14/20
Joypad	N/A	92/100
Video Games (DE)	63%	57%
Sega Force	63/100	85/100
Sega Magazine	81%	80%

The game received generally favorable reviews. EGM called it "just plain fun". Sega Magazine found the platforming "superb", despite lacking difficulty, giving a rating of 80/81% to the Master System and Game Gear editions, respectively.

In a 2011 retrospective review for HardcoreGaming101, Audun Sorlie credited it with “some of the best graphics on the system,” praising the animations as “exceptionally smooth,” but, much like contemporary reviewers, found it “too easy, short and unimaginative.”
