= Castle of Illusion Starring Mickey Mouse =

1990 video game

- North American Genesis cover art
- Developer: Sega
- Publisher: Sega
- Directors: Emiko Yamamoto (Genesis); Yoshio Yoshida (Master System, Game Gear)
- Producer: Stephan L. Butler
- Designers: Emiko Yamamoto; Yoshio Yoshida (Genesis); Tomozō Endō; Michel Koba; Emiko Yamamoto (Master System, Game Gear)
- Artists: Takashi Yuda; Mikarin Nishida (Genesis); Takako Kawaguchi; Kyuuzou F. (Master System, Game Gear)
- Composers: Tokuhiko Uwabo; Shigenori Kamiya
- Series: Illusion
- Platforms: Sega Genesis, Master System, Game Gear, Saturn
- Release: Sega Genesis: JP: November 21, 1990; NA: December 1990; EU: March 1990; Master System: NA/EU: February 1990; Game Gear: JP: March 21, 1990; NA/EU: June 1990; Saturn: JP: October 15, 1998
- Genre: Platform
- Mode: Single-player

Castle of Illusion Starring Mickey Mouse (Note: Mega Drive version is known in Japan as I Love Mickey Mouse: Mysterious Castle Great Adventure (アイラブミッキーマウス ふしぎのお城大冒険).) (Note: Game Gear version is known in Japan as Mickey Mouse's Castle Illusion (ミッキーマウスのキャッスル・イリュージョン).) is a 1990 platform game developed and published by Sega and released for the Sega Genesis. An 8-bit version of the game was later released for the Master System and Game Gear. The game follows Mickey Mouse on a quest to save Minnie Mouse from the evil witch Mizrabel. It is the first game in Sega's Illusion video game series starring Mickey.

Castle of Illusion was very well received by critics, especially the original 16-bit version. It was re-released in 1998 in Japan as part of Sega Ages: Mickey Mouse & Donald Duck for the Sega Saturn, which features both Castle of Illusion and QuackShot. A remake of the game by Sega Studios Australia was released for PlayStation Network, Windows, and Xbox Live Arcade in September 2013. The game was also included on the Sega Genesis Mini in 2019.

== Plot ==
In Vera City, Mickey and Minnie Mouse enjoy their time of peace along with everyone else, except for the evil witch, Mizrabel, who was jealous of Minnie's beauty. One day, Mizrabel kidnaps Minnie and takes her back to her domain known as the "Castle of Illusion". Mickey pursues them both to rescue Minnie, and upon arriving at the castle, he meets its true owner and king, who informs Mickey that Mizrabel plans to absorb Minnie's beauty to make herself look beautiful and Minnie ugly, but Mickey can stop her by gathering the "Seven Gems of Rainbow", which are protected by Mizrabel's most powerful henchmen, known as the "Masters of Illusion".

While traversing the castle, Mickey finds himself going into various illusion worlds and fighting against Mizrabel's army of bizarre creatures. Upon gathering all the gems, they create a bridge that allow Mickey to traverse a gap to the main tower, where Mickey finally confronts Mizrabel, who uses Minnie to transform into a younger version of herself and attack Mickey with a legion of specters. After damaging her a bit, Mickey then uses the full power of the gems to revert Mizrabel back into her original form and release Minnie. But as they embrace each other, the castle begins to crumble apart around them, though Mizrabel had sudden change of heart and flew all three to safety.

== Gameplay ==
Mickey Mouse in Level 2: Toyland

Mickey's main method of attack is to perform a "bounce" whilst jumping, which can be used to defeat enemies or to bounce upwards towards higher areas. Mickey can collect projectiles such as apples and marbles to throw at his opponents. There are various items that earn bonus points, increase the player's health and grant extra tries. Clearing a level also rewards the player with additional points, including a "Technical Bonus" based on how much health the level was completed with and a "Secret Bonus" based on how many projectiles Mickey has left.

Every level ends in a boss battle against each Master of Illusion (Mizrabel's henchmen) where Mickey can earn a gem, although the final two levels award a gem halfway through. After clearing all five levels, obtaining all gems will open up the route to the witch's tower. There, the player faces the final boss: a giant and youthful version of Mizrabel. There is an easy mode available where players play through truncated versions of the first three levels, with no boss fights.

The Master System and Game Gear versions of the game have different game mechanics, enemies, items, levels and graphics.

== Development and release ==
The Sega Genesis was released in North America in August 1989. At the time, Sega had little presence in the territory, prompting its American branch to license several pop culture personalities, including Michael Jackson, Joe Montana, Tommy Lasorda, Buster Douglas, and Dick Tracy. Obtaining the rights to Mickey Mouse was more difficult, as The Walt Disney Company was protective of its intellectual properties. For this reason, Sega needed to guarantee that the character's image would be carefully handled, as well as prove the Genesis's viability. After several meetings between Disney representatives, Sega of America president Michael Katz, and Sega director of marketing Al Nielsen, Sega managed to obtain the license.

Upon securing the rights, Sega began promoting the game in its advertising, during which it was tentatively titled Mickey Mouse. Sega assigned the game's development to designer Emiko Yamamoto, who was credited under the pseudonym "Emirin"; publishers of the era commonly hid the real names of their developers to prevent personnel from being poached by competitors. Castle of Illusion was Yamamoto's first game. She and the development team decided not to make a game simply centered on Mickey Mouse, but one that illustrated Disney's extensive lore by including larger elements of its universe. The team drew inspiration from the company's classic films, particularly for the game's enemies and bosses; for example, the clock tower boss was based on Willie the Giant from Fun and Fancy Free (1947). The antagonist Mizrabel, in her initial old woman form, resembles the Evil Queen from Snow White and the Seven Dwarfs (1937), while the form she takes in the final battle is similar to Maleficent from Sleeping Beauty (1959). Her name is derived from the musical Les Misérables, which was popular at the time.

The developers attempted to emulate the style of Disney films, which required a large number of animations and eventually affected the level design. For example, the number of frames used to create Mickey's jumping animation increased the jump's distance, requiring the levels to be redesigned around it. Mickey Mouse is one of the first characters in a video game to feature an idle animation; when standing still, he smiles broadly and sways his hips, and he wavers when left near an edge of a platform or cliff. Both animations were shown to art director Takashi Yuda, who was so impressed that he agreed to add them to the game. Nilsen emphasized the game's use of animation to express Mickey's emotions during his presentation of the Genesis on a December 6, 1990 episode of Computer Chronicles. The amount of motion in the game's environments pushed the boundaries of the console's VRAM, requiring Yuda and the art team to work with the programmers to meet the console's restrictions. Disney producer Stephen Butler collaborated with Sega of America senior producer Jim Huether to ensure the game remained true to the Mickey Mouse character, coordinating with Sega and Disney in Japan and providing suggestions and feedback.

The Master System version, for which Yamamoto was also the director and designer, is a reimagining tailored to the console's capabilities rather than a port. The game was included on a cartridge entitled Disney Collection, bundled with QuackShot, in 1996. An emulated version of Castle of Illusion was included in a bundle for those who preordered its remake on PSN, this bundle was offered again for PlayStation Plus subscribers in April 2014.

== Reception ==
Reviews (Sega Genesis)

Review scores
Publication	Score
Computer and Video Games	93%
Electronic Gaming Monthly	9/10, 9/10, 9/10, 9/10
Famitsu	6/10, 8/10, 9/10, 7/10
GamePro	22/25
Raze	92%
Arcade County	90%
Mean Machines	95%
MegaTech	93%
Sega Power	94%
Console XS	96%
Mega Action	90%

=== Sega Genesis ===
At the time of its release, Castle of Illusion received positive reviews. Mean Machines gave the Sega Genesis version of the game a positive review, awarding it a score of 95% while specifically praising the game's graphics and playability. Console XS gave an overall score of 96% and praised the graphics, sound, and dynamic gameplay. Mega Action gave a review score of 90% and described the game as "a classic game with a massive playing area". They also praised the graphics and sound, concluding: "We guarantee that you will be not disappointed". MegaTech opined the game is one of the best platform games on the MegaDrive and praised the game for combining superlative graphics and excellent gameplay, making Castle of Illusion addictive and an enjoyable challenge.

Entertainment Weekly picked the game as the #19 greatest game available in 1990, saying: "Perfect for younger players, but challenging enough to satisfy adults, too. A superbly animated Mickey bops through three different worlds—the Enchanted Forest, Toyland, and the Dessert Factory—in a quest to save Minnie from the evil witch Mizrabel".

Mega placed it at the 21st spot on their 1990 list of top Mega Drive games of all time.

According to GameSpot in 2010, "it wasn't just the levels that made this game so good. The music, the controls, and Mickey's superb animation all contributed to one of the very best Disney games that would heavily influence those to follow". In 2017, Gamesradar placed the game 35th on its "Best Sega Genesis/Mega Drive games of all time".

=== Master System/Game Gear ===
Reviews (Master System and Game Gear)

Review scores
Publication	Score
ACE	810/1000 (Game Gear)
Electronic Gaming Monthly	7/10, 8/10, 8/10, 8/10 (GG)
Famitsu	5/10, 6/10, 7/10, 5/10 (Game Gear)
Console XS	94% (Master System); 95% (Game Gear)
Mean Machines	93% (Master System)
Sega Power	96% (Master System)

The Master System version also received positive reviews. Sega Power magazine in 1990 rated it the best Master System game of all time.

ACE called the Game Gear version "basically an unadulterated Mario clone—and not a bad one at that", giving it a score of eight out of ten. Console XS called the Castle of Illusion one of best games on the Master System writing: "Brilliant animation and sprite definition make this a joy to watch". They also praised the Game Gear version saying that it contains most of the levels from the other versions and Mickey looking superb because of the shrunken graphics.

The Master System version was TecToy's best-selling Master System game in Brazil.

== Legacy ==
A sequel, Land of Illusion Starring Mickey Mouse, was released for the Master System in 1992 and for the Game Gear in 1992. World of Illusion Starring Mickey Mouse and Donald Duck followed for the Genesis in 1992. In 1994, Legend of Illusion Starring Mickey Mouse was released for the Game Gear, with a Master System port following in 1990 in Brazil.

Epic Mickey: Power of Illusion, developed by DreamRift, was released in November 2012 for the Nintendo 3DS and serves as a spiritual successor to Castle of Illusion.

A remake of the game, developed by Sega Studios Australia, was released for the PlayStation Network, Windows, and Xbox Live Arcade in September 2013. The game features 2.5D gameplay with 3D graphics and was developed under the supervision of the original game's director, Emiko Yamamoto, with a reimagined soundtrack by Grant Kirkhope. The original game was made available as a pre-order bonus for the PSN version.

== See also ==
- List of Disney video games
