= World of Illusion =

1992 platform video game

World of Illusion Starring Mickey Mouse and Donald Duck
- European Mega Drive box art
- Developer: Sega
- Publisher: Sega
- Director: Emiko Yamamoto
- Producer: Patrick Gilmore
- Designers: Emiko Yamamoto; Yagami
- Artists: Takashi Yuda; Mikarin Nishida
- Composers: Haruyo Oguro; Tomoko Sasaki
- Series: Illusion
- Platform: Genesis
- Release: JP: December 18, 1992; EU: December 1992; NA: March 1993
- Genre: Platform
- Modes: Single-player, multiplayer

World of Illusion Starring Mickey Mouse and Donald Duck (Note: Released in Japan as I Love Mickey & Donald: Fushigi na Magic Box (アイラブ ミッキー＆ドナルド ふしぎなマジックボックス, Ai Rabu Mikkī & Donarudo: Fushigi na Majikku Bokkusu; lit. "I Love Mickey & Donald: Mysterious Magic Box").) is a platform game developed and published by Sega for the Sega Genesis. The game was released in December 1992, and is part of Sega's Illusion series of Mickey Mouse games. The game was included on the Sega Genesis Mini.

== Plot ==
Whilst preparing for a magical act, Mickey Mouse and Donald Duck discover a magical box. This turns out to belong to an evil magician (Pete) who sends Mickey and Donald to a magical world. Mickey and Donald must now work together in order to find a way back home.

== Gameplay ==
Mickey and Donald in the first level. The number of cards represent the characters' health and are turned face-down when they take damage.

Players can either play solo as either Mickey Mouse or Donald Duck, or co-operatively with two players controlling Mickey and Donald while sharing from the same pool of tries. Mickey and Donald can run, jump, or attack by flourishing their capes. Enemies defeated in this way turn into doves, cards, or other harmless objects depending on the enemy. After defeating the boss of each level, a new magic spell is learned, allowing the pair to traverse the next level, i.e. flying on a magic carpet or going underwater in an air bubble. The gameplay changes significantly depending on the characters chosen. For example, Mickey can squeeze through certain gaps, while Donald must find a different route, leading him to entirely different realms. When playing in two-player mode, the players can stand on each other's shoulders and use ropes to help each other out, and Mickey can pull Donald through gaps he cannot otherwise fit through.

World of Illusion comprises five principal stages named the "Enchanted Forest", "Among the Clouds", "Underwater Adventure", "The Library" and "The Magic Box". There also exist, within these five stages, three sets of sub-stages (some of which are optional) which are accessible only while playing either as Mickey or as Donald in one-player mode, or in two-player mode.

== Design ==
The game's music, artwork and animation shows influences from Disney animated films, including Snow White and the Seven Dwarfs, Pinocchio, Fantasia, Sleeping Beauty, The Sword in the Stone and The Little Mermaid as well as various Silly Symphonies shorts. Some of the influences are directly literal, such as the appearance of the playing-card soldiers from Disney's 1951 film adaptation of Alice in Wonderland, in the castle-garden section of the "Magic Box" stage.

== Reception ==
MegaTech gave the game 90% and a Hyper Game Award, saying that it had "the best graphics of any Disney game yet", but said that it was very easy to finish. Mega gave the game an 82% score, saying it was "very easy to complete, and dull in one-player, but fantastic for a couple of youngsters". Bad Influence! scored it a full 10 out of 10 stars. In 2017, Gamesradar ranked the game 22nd on their "Best Sega Genesis/Mega Drive games of all time" list.

== See also ==
- List of Disney video games
