= List of Kemco games =

This is a list of Kemco games. Of note, the video games in North America prior to 1992 were not published by Kemco themselves, but instead by their distributor Seika Corporation of Torrance, California, who used the label Kemco * Seika to market Kemco's titles in the region.

== Console-based games ==
=== Original games ===
Title	Consoles	Release date	JP	NA	PAL	Notes
Space Hunter	NES	September 25, 1986	Yes	No	No	
Toki no Tabibito: Time Stranger	NES	December 26, 1986	Yes	No	No	
Indora no Hikari	NES	October 20, 1987	Yes	No	No	
Desert Commander	NES	April 28, 1988	Yes	Yes	No	Based on events of World War II.
Sanada Ten Braves	NES	June 27, 1988	Yes	No	No	Based on the Sanada Ten Braves Ninja group.
Ghost Lion	NES	July 14, 1989	Yes	Yes	No	
The Sword of Hope	Game Boy	December 28, 1989	Yes	Yes	Yes	
Nekojara Monogatari	Game Boy	December 14, 1990	Yes	No	No	
Top Gear	SNES	March 27, 1992	Yes	Yes	Yes	Developed by Gremlin Graphics.
The Sword of Hope II	Game Boy	September 4, 1992	Yes	Yes	No	
Kid Klown in Night Mayor World	NES	April 1, 1993	No	Yes	No	Reskin of Mickey Mouse III: Yume Fuusen.
X-Zone	SNES	November 1992	Yes	Yes	Yes	
Dr. Franken	Game Boy	December 1992	No	Yes	No	Developed by Motivetime.
Top Gear 2	SNES	August 8, 1993	Yes	Yes	Yes	Developed by Gremlin Graphics.
Kid Klown in Crazy Chase	SNES	September 10, 1994	Yes	Yes	Yes	
Kid Klown in Crazy Chase	Game Boy Advance	October 21, 2002	No	Yes	Yes	
Top Gear 3000	SNES	February 1995	Yes	Yes	No	Developed by Gremlin Graphics.
Prehistorik Man	SNES	June 23, 1995	Yes	No	No	Developed by Titus France.
Virtual League Baseball	Virtual Boy	August 11, 1995	Yes	Yes	No	
Kid Klown in Crazy Chase 2: Love Love Hani Soudatsusen	PlayStation	December 6, 1996	Yes	No	No	
Soreyuke!! Kid	Game Boy	July 18, 1997	Yes	No	No	
The Bombing Islands	PlayStation	July 18, 1997	Yes	Yes	Yes	
The Bombing Islands	Nintendo 64	April 30, 1999	No	Yes	Yes	Developed by Realtime Associates.
Top Gear Rally	Nintendo 64	October 1997	Yes	No	Yes	Developed by Boss Game Studios.
Top Gear Rally	Game Boy Color	March 25, 1999	Yes	No	Yes	Developed by Vision Works.
Top Gear Rally	Game Boy Advance	July 25, 2003	Yes	No	Yes	Developed by Tantalus Interactive.
Knife Edge: Nose Gunner	Nintendo 64	November 10, 1998	Yes	Yes	Yes	
Twisted Edge Extreme Snowboarding	Nintendo 64	November 10, 1998	Yes	No	Yes	Developed by Boss Game Studios.
Top Gear Overdrive	Nintendo 64	November 23, 1998	Yes	Yes	Yes	
Deja Vu I and II	Game Boy Color	October 15, 1999	Yes	No	Yes	Developed by Infinite Ventures.
Top Gear Rally 2	Nintendo 64	December 3, 1999	Yes	Yes	Yes	
Top Gear Rally 2	Game Boy Color	December 17, 1999	Yes	No	Yes	
Top Gear Pocket 2	Game Boy Color	December 17, 1999	Yes	No	Yes	
Top Gear Hyper Bike	Nintendo 64	March 17, 2000	Yes	Yes	Yes	Developed by Snowblind Studios.
Top Gear: Dare Devil	PlayStation 2	December 19, 2000	Yes	Yes	No	Developed by Papaya Studio.
Top Gear GT Championship	Game Boy Advance	March 21, 2001	Yes	Yes	Yes	
Mech Platoon	Game Boy Advance	November 28, 2001	Yes	Yes	Yes	
Egg Mania: Eggstreme Madness	GameCube	September 11, 2002	Yes	Yes	Yes	Developed by HotGen.
Egg Mania: Eggstreme Madness	Xbox	September 11, 2002	Yes	Yes	Yes	Developed by HotGen.
Egg Mania: Eggstreme Madness	PlayStation 2	September 12, 2002	Yes	Yes	Yes	Developed by HotGen.
Egg Mania: Eggstreme Madness	Game Boy Advance	September 16, 2002	Yes	Yes	Yes	Developed by HotGen.
Batman: Dark Tomorrow	GameCube	March 21, 2003	Yes	Yes	Yes	Uses characters from DC Comics.
GET! Boku no Mushitsu Kamaete	Game Boy Advance	July 11, 2003	Yes	No	No	Developed by Wizard.
Rogue Ops	Xbox	October 28, 2003	Yes	Yes	Yes	Developed by Bits Studios.
Rogue Ops	PlayStation 2	October 29, 2003	Yes	Yes	Yes	Developed by Bits Studios.
Rogue Ops	GameCube	October 29, 2003	Yes	Yes	Yes	Developed by Bits Studios.
Yager	Xbox	September 28, 2004	No	Yes	No	Developed by Yager Development.

=== Ports, localizations, and licensed games ===
Title	Consoles	Release date	JP	NA	PAL	Notes
Dough Boy	NES	December 11, 1985	Yes	No	No	Port of the Commodore 64 game by Synapse Software.
Spy vs. Spy	NES	April 26, 1986	Yes	No	No	Port of the game by First Star Software. Based on Spy vs. Spy.
Spy vs. Spy	Game Boy Color	July 23, 1999	Yes	No	Yes	Port of the game by First Star Software. Based on Spy vs. Spy.
Electrician	NES	December 26, 1986	Yes	No	No	Port of the Atari 8-bit game by Synapse Software.
Nankoku Shirei!! Spy vs. Spy	NES	March 27, 1987	Yes	No	No	Based on Spy vs. Spy.
Superman	NES	December 22, 1987	Yes	Yes	No	Based on the first two Superman films.
Donald Duck/Snoopy's Silly Sports Spectacular	NES	September 22, 1988	Yes	Yes	Yes	Uses characters from Disney productions and the Peanuts comics.
Déjà Vu	NES	November 22, 1988	Yes	Yes	No	Port of the game by ICOM Simulations.
Legend of the Galactic Heroes	NES	December 21, 1988	Yes	No	No	Based on the novels by Yoshiki Tanaka.
Roger Rabbit/Mickey Mouse/The Bugs Bunny Crazy Castle	FDS	February 16, 1989	Yes	No	No	Uses characters from Who Framed Roger Rabbit, other Disney productions, and Looney Tunes.
Roger Rabbit/Mickey Mouse/The Bugs Bunny Crazy Castle	Game Boy	May 5, 1989	Yes	Yes	No	Uses characters from Who Framed Roger Rabbit, other Disney productions, and Looney Tunes.
Roger Rabbit/Mickey Mouse/The Bugs Bunny Crazy Castle	NES	August 1989	No	Yes	No	Uses characters from Who Framed Roger Rabbit, other Disney productions, and Looney Tunes.
Shadowgate	NES	March 31, 1989	Yes	Yes	No	Port of the Macintosh game by ICOM Simulations.
Shadowgate	Game Boy Color	January 1999	Yes	Yes	Yes	Published outside of Japan by Nintendo.
Uninvited	NES	September 21, 1989	Yes	Yes	No	Port of the game by ICOM Simulations.
Rescue: The Embassy Mission	NES	December 1, 1989	Yes	Yes	No	Port of the game by Infogrames.
Snoopy's Magic Show	Game Boy	April 28, 1990	Yes	Yes	Yes	Uses characters from the Peanuts comics.
Rocket Ranger	NES	June 1990	No	Yes	No	Developed by Beam Software. Port of the game by Cinemaware.
The Bugs Bunny Birthday Blowout	NES	August 3, 1990	Yes	Yes	Yes	Uses characters from Looney Tunes.
North & South	NES	September 21, 1990	Yes	Yes	No	Port of the game by Infogrames. Offshoot of the Belgian comic series Les Tuniques Bleues.
Ka-Blooey	SNES	December 1, 1990	Yes	Yes	No	Port of the game by Mirrorsoft.
Mickey Mouse II/The Bugs Bunny Crazy Castle 2/Hugo	Game Boy	April 26, 1991	Yes	Yes	Yes	Uses characters from Disney productions, Looney Tunes, and the Hugo franchise.
Drakkhen	SNES	May 24, 1991	Yes	Yes	No	Port of the game by Infogrames.
Dragon Wars	NES	August 9, 1991	Yes	No	No	Port of the game by Interplay Productions.
Lagoon	SNES	December 12, 1991	Yes	Yes	Yes	Port of the X68000 game by Zoom.
Track & Field in Barcelona	NES	February 2, 1992	No	No	Yes	Developed by Konami. Port of the arcade game by Konami.
Spy vs. Spy	Game Boy	May 2, 1992	Yes	Yes	No	Based on Spy vs. Spy.
Phalanx	SNES	August 7, 1992	Yes	Yes	Yes	Port of the X68000 game by Zoom.
Phalanx	Game Boy Advance	October 26, 2001	Yes	Yes	Yes	Port of the X68000 game by Zoom.
Mickey Mouse III: Yume Fuusen	NES	September 30, 1992	Yes	No	No	Mickey Mouse III uses characters from Disney productions. The game served as the base for Kid Klown in Night Mayor World.
Mickey's Dangerous Chase	Game Boy	December 18, 1992	Yes	No	No	Licensed from Capcom.
The Blues Brothers	SNES	March 26, 1993	Yes	No	No	Licensed from Titus France.
Mickey Mouse IV: Mahou no Labyrinth/Garfield Labyrinth	Game Boy	April 23, 1993	Yes	No	Yes	Uses characters from Disney productions and the Garfield franchise.
First Samurai	SNES	July 2, 1993	Yes	Yes	Yes	Port of the game by Vivid Image.
Mickey Mouse: Magic Wands!	Game Boy	December 22, 1993	Yes	No	No	Uses characters from Disney productions.
Super Troll Islands	SNES	March 25, 1994	Yes	Yes	Yes	Licensed from Millennium Interactive. Based on the Troll dolls.
Genocide 2	SNES	August 5, 1994	Yes	No	No	Developed by Bits Studio. Port of the X68000 game by Zoom.
Dragon View	SNES	August 26, 1994	Yes	Yes	No	Based on Drakkhen.
Stone Protectors	SNES	November 1994	Yes	Yes	No	Developed by Eurocom. Based on the Stone Protectors franchise.
Brutal	SNES	December 22, 1994	Yes	No	No	Developed by Eurocom. Port of the game by GameTek.
Prehistorik Man	Game Boy	December 22, 1995	Yes	No	No	Port of the game by Titus France.
Snoopy no Hajimete no Otsukai	Game Boy	December 21, 1996	Yes	No	No	Uses characters from the Peanuts franchise.
Bugs Bunny Collection	Game Boy	December 19, 1997	Yes	No	No	Uses characters from the Looney Tunes franchise.
Bugs Bunny: Crazy Castle 3	Game Boy Color	January 29, 1999	Yes	Yes	Yes	Uses characters from the Looney Tunes franchise.
Shadowgate 64: Trials of the Four Towers	Nintendo 64	May 31, 1999	Yes	Yes	Yes	Developed by TNS and Infinite Ventures. Part of the Shadowgate franchise.
Catwoman	Game Boy Color	December 1999	No	Yes	Yes	Uses characters from DC Comics.
Bugs Bunny in Crazy Castle 4	Game Boy Color	April 21, 2000	Yes	Yes	Yes	Uses characters from the Looney Tunes franchise.
Daikatana	Nintendo 64	May 26, 2000	No	Yes	Yes	Port of the game by Eidos Interactive.
Daikatana	Game Boy Color	September 26, 2000	No	No	Yes	Developed by Will. Port of the game by Eidos Interactive.
Tweety's High-Flying Adventure	Game Boy Color	August 11, 2000	Yes	Yes	Yes	Uses characters from the Looney Tunes franchise.
Batman Beyond: Return of the Joker	Game Boy Color	November 20, 2000	No	Yes	Yes	Published by Ubisoft. Uses characters from DC Comics.
Batman Beyond: Return of the Joker	PlayStation	November 20, 2000	Yes	Yes	Yes	Published by Ubisoft. Uses characters from DC Comics.
Batman Beyond: Return of the Joker	Nintendo 64	December 13, 2000	No	Yes	Yes	Published by Ubisoft. Uses characters from DC Comics.
Tweety & The Magic Gems	Game Boy Advance	March 21, 2001	Yes	Yes	Yes	Uses characters from the Looney Tunes franchise.
Universal Studios Theme Parks Adventure	GameCube	December 7, 2001	Yes	Yes	Yes	Developed by Nai'a Digital Works.
Boulder Dash EX	Game Boy Advance	September 16, 2002	Yes	Yes	Yes	Developed by Vision Works. Based on Boulder Dash.
Woody Woodpecker Crazy Castle 5	Game Boy Advance	December 6, 2002	Yes	Yes	Yes	Developed by Tantalus Interactive. Uses characters from the Woody Woodpecker franchise.
Batman: Dark Tomorrow	Xbox	March 18, 2003	Yes	Yes	Yes	Developed by HotGen. Uses characters from DC Comics.
Dai Senryaku VII: Modern Military Tactics	Xbox	February 16, 2005	No	Yes	No	Licensed from SystemSoft.
Chicago Enforcer	Xbox	February 23, 2005	No	Yes	No	Port of the game by Touchdown Entertainment.

== Digital games ==
=== 2007 ===
- Alphadia (NTT DoCoMo Mobile Phone)

=== 2008 ===
- Alphadia II (NTT DoCoMo Mobile Phone)
- Orleans no Otome: Jeanne D'Arc no Monogatari (NTT DoCoMo Mobile Phone)
- Sorcery Blade (WiiWare)

=== 2009 ===
- Alphadia III (NTT DoCoMo Mobile Phone)
- Ayakashigatari (NTT DoCoMo Mobile Phone)
- Symphony of Eternity (NTT DoCoMo Mobile Phone)

=== 2010 ===
- Alphadia IV (NTT DoCoMo Mobile Phone)
- Dark Gate (NTT DoCoMo Mobile Phone)
- Eve of the Genesis (NTT DoCoMo Mobile Phone)
- Fantasy Chronicle (NTT DoCoMo Mobile Phone)
- Symphony of Eternity (iOS & Android)

=== 2011 ===
- Aeon Avenger (iOS & Android)
- Alphadia (iOS & Android)
- Alphadia V (NTT DoCoMo Mobile Phone)
- CODE: Cerberus (Android)
- Eve of the Genesis (iOS & Android)
- Fantasy Chronicle (iOS & Android)
- Grinsia (iOS & Android)
- Machine Knight (iOS & Android)

=== 2012 ===
- Bonds of the Skies (iOS, Android, PSVita)
- Covenant of Solitude (iOS & Android)
- End of Aspiration (iOS & Android)
- Knight of the Earthends (iOS & Android)
- Mystic Chronicles (iOS & Android)
- Silver Nornir (iOS & Android)
- Symphony of the Origin (iOS & Android)

=== 2013 ===
- Ancient Phantasma (Android)
- Band of Monsters (iOS & Android)
- Chronus Arc (iOS & Android)
- Chrome Wolf (iOS & Android)
- CRYSTAREINO: Mezameshi Yuusha to Suishou no Oukoku (iOS & Android)
- Destiny Fantasia (iOS & Android)
- D.M.L.C.: Death Match Love Comedy (Android)
- Fanatic Earth (iOS & Android)
- Infinite Dunamis (iOS & Android)
- Izumo Rei no Chousahoukokucho: Tozasareta Negai (Android)
- Justice Chronicles (Android)
- Legend of Ixtona (iOS & Android)
- Legacy Code: Mahou Sekai no Tankyuusha (Android)
- Link of Hearts (iOS & Android)
- Rusted Emeth (iOS & Android)
- Seinaru Kishi no Monogatari (Android)
- Seven Sacred Beasts (Android)
- Soul of Deva: The Saiyuki Fantasy (iOS & Android)
- Soul Historica (iOS & Android)
- Cross Hearts Acadia (Android & iOS)
- Togabito no Senritsu (Wii U)

=== 2014 ===
- Alphadia Genesis (Android)
- Asdivine Hearts (iOS, Android and 3DS)
- Dead Dragons (Android)
- Fortuna Magus (iOS & Android)
- Journey to Kreisia (Android)
- Lefalsia no Genei (Android)
- Shining Mars (Android)
- Shelterra The Sky World (iOS & Android)
- Tears Revolude (Android)
- Revenant Saga (iOS, PS3, Android)
- Eclipse of Illusion (Android & iOS)
- Illusion of L'Phalcia (Android & iOS)
- Fanatic Earth (Android)
- Soul of Deva (Android)
- Shelterra the sky world (Android)
- Rusted Emeth (Android)

=== 2015 ===
- Kamen Rider Drive (Android & iOS)
- Alphadia Genesis (PC, iOS & Android)
- Tears Revolude (PC, iOS & Android)
- Asdivine Dios (iOS & Android)
- Justice Chronicles (3DS, Android & iOS)
- Legend of Ixtona (Android & iOS)
- Blood of Calamity (Android & iOS)
- Valkyria Soul (Android & iOS)
- Dark Seven (Android & iOS)
- Revenant Dogma (Android & iOS)
- Grace of Letoile (Android & iOS)
- Seven Sacred Beasts (Android & iOS)

=== 2016 ===
- Asdivine Cross (Android & iOS)
- Asdivine Menace (Android & iOS)
- Antiquia Lost (Android & iOS)
- Glorious Savior (Android & iOS)
- Astral Frontier (Android & iOS)
- Fairy Elements (Android & iOS)
- Elio: A Fantasy of Light and Darkness (Android & iOS)
- Justice Chronicles (Android & iOS)

=== 2017 ===
- Asdivine Cross (3DS)
- Asdivine Hearts II (Android, iOS)
- Legna Tactica (Android)
- Onigo Hunter (Android, iOS)
- Djinn Caster (Android, iOS, PC, Mac, PS4, PSVita, Wii U)
- Revenant Saga (Android, iOS, PS Vita, PC, Nintendo Switch)
- Antiquia Lost (Nintendo Switch, PS4, PSVita, PC)
- Yōdanji (Android)
- Asdivine Hearts (PS4, PS3, PSVita)

=== 2018 ===
- Dragon Sinker (Nintendo 3DS, Nintendo Switch, PS4, PSVita)
- Dragon Lapis (Nintendo 3DS, Nintendo Switch, iOS)
- Machine Knight (Nintendo 3DS)
- Heirs of the Kings (Android)
- Revenant Dogma (Xbox One, Windows 10, PS4, PSVita)
- Fernz Gate (Xbox One, Windows 10, Nintendo Switch)
- Chronus Arc (Xbox One, Windows 10, Nintendo Switch, Android, iOS)
- Wizards of Brandel (Android)
- Fairy Elements (Android)
- Onigo Hunter (Nintendo 3DS)
- Asdivine Hearts II (Xbox One)
- Marenian Tavern Story: Patty and the Hungry God (PlayStation 4, Nintendo Switch, Android, iOS)
- Sephirothic Stories (Android, iOS)

=== 2019 ===
- Seek Hearts (Android, iOS)
- Asdivine Dios (Xbox One, PS4, Switch, PSVita)
- Asdivine Hearts II (PS4, PSVita, Switch)
- Revenant Saga (Xbox One)
- Sephirothic Stories (PS4, PSVita, Switch, Xbox One)
- Alvastia Chronicles (PS4, PSVita, Switch)
- Dimension Cross (Android, iOS)
- Legend of the Tetrarchs (Android, iOS, PS4, Switch, Xbox One, Steam)
- Frane: Dragon Odyssey (PS4, PSVita, Switch, Xbox One)
- Ambition Record (Android)
- Asdivine Kamura (Android, iOS, PS4, Xbox One, Steam, Switch)
- Monochrome Order (Android, Steam, Xbox One, PS4, Switch)
- Innocent Revenger (Android)
- Archlion Saga (Switch)
- Illusion of L'Phalcia (PS4, PSVita, Switch, Xbox One)
- Asdivine Menace (PS4, PSVita, Switch, Xbox One)
- Everdark Tower (Switch)
- Masou no Viator (Android, iOS)
- Wizards of Brandel (PS4, PSVita, Switch, Xbox One)

=== 2020 ===
- Dragon Sinker (Xbox One)
- Monster Viator (Xbox One, PS4, iOS, Android, Switch)
- Liege Dragon (Xbox One, PS4, iOS, Android, Switch)
- Alphadia Genesis (Xbox One, PS4, Switch)
- Miden Tower (Xbox One, PS4, iOS, Android, Switch)
- Ruinverse (Xbox One, PC, Android, iOS)
- Crystal Ortha (Xbox One, PS4, iOS, Android, Switch)
- Dragon Lapis (Xbox One, PS4, Switch)
- Coloured Quartet (Android)

=== 2021 ===
- Raging Loop (Android, PC, PS4, Xbox One)
- Blacksmith of the Sand Kingdom (Android, PC, iOS, PS4, Xbox One)
- Asdivine Saga (Android, iOS, PC, PS4)
- Ruinverse (Switch, PS4, PS5)
- Asdivine Cross (Switch, PS4, Xbox One, Xbox Series X, PS5)
- Chroma Quaternion (Android, iOS, PC, Xbox One, Xbox Series X, Switch)
- Archetype Arcadia (Switch, PS4, PS5, PC, iOS, Android)

=== 2022 ===
- RPGolf Legends (PC, Switch, PS4, Xbox One, PS5, Xbox Series X/S)
- Overrogue (PC, Switch, Android, iOS, PS4, Xbox One, Xbox Series X/S)
- Sword of Elpisia (PC, Switch, Android, iOS, PS4, PS5, Xbox One)
- Infinite Links (PC, Switch, Android, iOS, PS4, PS5, Xbox Series X/S)
- Dragon Prana (PC, Android, iOS, Xbox Series X/S)
- Gale of Windoria (PC, Switch, Android, iOS, PS4, PS5, Xbox Series X/S)
- Alphadia Neo (PC, Switch, Android, iOS, PS4, PS5, Xbox One, Xbox Series X/S)
- Jinshin (PC, Switch, Android, iOS, PS4, PS5, Xbox One, Xbox Series X/S)

=== 2023 ===
- Cross Tails (PC, Switch, PS4, Xbox One, PS5, Xbox Series X/S)
- Isekai Rondo (Android, PC, Switch, iOS, PS5, Xbox Series X/S)
- Death Palette (Switch, PS4, PS5, Xbox One, Xbox Series X/S)
- Sagashi monowanatsudesuka (Switch, PS4, Xbox One, PS5, Xbox Series X/S, Steam)
- Metro Quester (Switch, PS4, PS5, Xbox One, Xbox Series X/S)
- Nice Disc: The Last Hot Blood (Switch)

=== 2024 ===
- Eldgear (Switch, PS4, Xbox One, PS5, Xbox Series X/S, PC)
- Alphadia I & II (PS4, PS5, Xbox One, Xbox Series X/S, PC, Mobile, Switch, Switch 2)
- Astrune Academy (Switch, PS4, PS5, Xbox One, Xbox Series X/S, PC, iOS, Android)
- Genso Chronicles (Switch, PS4, PS5, Xbox One, Xbox Series X/S, PC)
- Ancient Phantasma (Switch, PS4, PS5, Xbox One, Xbox Series X/S, PC, Android)

== Canceled games ==
- Déjà Vu II: Lost in Las Vegas (NES/Famicom)
- The Arashi no Drift Rally: Ijoukishou o Tsuppashire
- The Flintstones in Viva Rock Vegas (GameCube)
- Daikatana
- Taitou
- Lobo
- Untitled Disney Channel game (Xbox 360's Kinect)
