= RPM Tuning =

2004 video game

- Developer: Babylon Software
- Publishers: Wanadoo; Kemco (Xbox NA); Valusoft (PC)
- Series: Top Gear
- Engine: RenderWare
- Platforms: Microsoft Windows, PlayStation 2, Xbox
- Release: PlayStation 2: EU: 19 November 2004; Xbox: NA: 16 February 2005; EU: 3 June 2005; Windows: NA: 4 March 2005
- Genre: Racing
- Modes: Single-player, multiplayer

RPM Tuning, also titled Top Gear RPM Tuning and as Midnight Outlaw: Six Hours To Sun Up for Microsoft Windows, is a racing video game developed by French studio Babylon Software and published by Wanadoo Edition in 2004 for Windows, PlayStation 2 and Xbox. It is part of the Top Gear game series. A PlayStation 2 version was not released in North America.

== Plot ==
The plot takes place in 2003 and is about Vince, an underground driver who is looking for a car, a GTSR model. His only clues are the name RedSet and the premises of a mechanic, a reference point for car enthusiasts in the area. Vince enters and explains to him that he is looking for a car and the mechanic lets him choose his car from three models: the Hatchback si, the Pick up 150 or the 322 ci. Then he meets Rick, an underground racer with his two henchmen: Mac and Dante. After a few races, he meets Carmen, the mechanic's daughter, and Lewis, his brother. The mechanic offers him an exchange for the GT coupe, as his is still new. After a while Rick introduces him to Mike, Lucy and then Donny, his mechanic, who offers him an exchange for the Horse V8, the second fastest car in the game. Later the thief turns out to be Rick, who was trying to sell it to a policeman called McCullen with a plan not to get caught. In one part Vince confronts Dante, then Rick. After Carmen, who used to hate Vince, now has fallen in love with him, shoots Rick and turns out it was him who wanted to sell the GTSR, just from a briefcase full of money that Vince finds in the boot of Rick's car.

== Reception ==
Reception

Aggregate score
Aggregator	Score
Metacritic	45/100

Review scores
Publication	Score
Game Informer	5/10
GameSpot	4.9/10
Official Xbox Magazine (US)	2.2/10
TeamXbox	5.7/10
X-Play	2/5

The Xbox version received "generally unfavourable reviews" according to the review aggregation website Metacritic.
