= Top Gear 3000 =

1995 video game

- North American cover art
- Developer: Gremlin Graphics
- Publishers: JP/NA: Kemco; EU: Gremlin Graphics
- Designer: Ashley Bennett
- Series: Top Gear
- Platform: Super NES
- Release: NA: February 1995; JP: April 28, 1995; EU: 1995
- Genre: Racing
- Modes: Single-player, multiplayer

Top Gear 3000, later released in Japan as The Planet's Champ: TG3000 (プラネットチャンプ TG3000), is a racing video game developed by Gremlin Interactive and published by Kemco for the Super Nintendo Entertainment System. It is the third game in the original Top Gear trilogy, and the last in the series to be developed by Gremlin. 3000 heavily resembles the previous Top Gear 2, but is set in the distant future.

== Comparison to series ==
Placing this game a thousand years in the future allowed the developers to plausibly include futuristic and improbable technologies, and abandon the relative realism of Top Gear 2.

Car upgrades were more extensive than in Top Gear 2, and "weapons" were featured for the first time in the series. Upgrades included a nuclear fusion engine, a cobalt-titanium armour kit, and a liquid polymer gearbox; weapons included a device to jump over cars, a warp device, and a magnetic attractor to steal kinetic energy from other cars.

Due to the capabilities of the new chip DSP-4 used for this game, it was the first game in the series that was possible to split the track in two different directions with different lengths, sometimes intentionally making one route much faster than the other. Top Gear 3000 was the only game in the history of the Super NES to use this chip.

== Story ==
The introduction states that anonymous benefactors and funders have created a massive galaxy-wide racing campaign at the outset of each millennium, and reward the winner with "riches beyond belief".

The instruction manual gives a more detailed dystopian story. The year is 2962 (and not 3000 as shown in the title of the video game). Five centuries before, World War XVII devastated most of the colonized planets of the Milky Way. The Galactic Conglomerate of Unified Planets, controlling the Bureau of Reasonable Entertainment, has maintained an era of calm and peaceful co-existence through the systematic suppression of any radical thought or action that may "stir up" the teeming masses of citizens populating the twelve star systems under their jurisdiction. Anything remotely resembling "fun" has been analyzed and sterilized.

Outlaw thrill seekers that have too much money and not enough excitement in their lives to keep them occupied turn to the Top Gear 3000 Challenge. Once every millennium, the richest, bravest, most skilled drivers risk it all in this car race through the planets of the Conglomerate.

== Gameplay ==
First track

The game has two distinct modes of gameplay, with Championship being the most expansive. Cars are limited by the range of their fuel, and of the condition of their frame; players gain fuel by driving over the red Recharge strips, and repair their car's structural integrity by driving over the blue Repair strips.

=== Championship ===
In Championship mode, one or two players can play, or one player can play with the screen split between their own view and that of an AI opponent. Players start off with identical cars and may change the color, name, speed units (MPH or km/h), and the button layout. Unlike in previous Top Gear games with a few pre-generated layouts, players may adjust any function to any button desired.

Each race contains a pack of twenty cars, with eighteen or nineteen named AI opponents. After races are won, players then spend earned credits replacing the engine, gearbox, tyres, armour, boost, and adding "weapons" capability. The AI opponents do not purchase upgrades, but grow steadily faster throughout the championship. Bonuses of various quantities may be placed on the track as spherical icons, or awarded for certain driver activities after the end of each race as secret bonuses. There are ostensibly five secret bonuses, but Secret Bonus B was not fully implemented and cannot be awarded.

Some races intentionally have less than minimum recharge strips, forcing the player to run out of gas. As the cars are futuristic, the cars can sustain a great speed even without gas, making it possible to win races without recharging. If the player hits a tree or another object that makes the car lose too much speed, the car then will run at a very low speed, almost not moving. The only way to make the car gain speed again is by running over a red strip, using the attractor on another car, being hit by a fast car or using a boost of level 4 or higher. As well, nuclear engines can keep the velocity even when the player does not have gas.

=== Upgrades ===
Not all upgrades are available from the beginning of the championship. As the player progresses through the championship, new engines, gearboxes, tyres, armour, boost and weapons become available. The game has three difficulty settings, each making the championship longer, and the AI cars faster. In the easy and medium difficulty settings, not all the level 6 components become available, preventing the player from purchasing all available upgrades.

The weapons do not influence the other racers at all. The players can jump over other cars, warp through other cars and even attract their car towards another, but these weapons only affect the player's car. The player can cycle between the weapons using the L or R trigger buttons.

- Jump is the only weapon controlled by the player that has no limit of uses. It is used to get bonuses, jump over other cars or even obstacles. It is very useful at the beginning of the race, when the player is far behind and has many cars to pass.
- Warp makes the car disappear for about 1.5 seconds, travel through the track (doing any turns correctly along the way) and then reappear. The car travels this distance almost instantly, so it can be used to pass cars ahead to avoid a crash. While invisible, the car is immune to any obstacle or car, but can still collect any bonuses along the way. The warp weapon is limited to four uses.
- Attractor places a target on screen, and when there is another car in sight, the target follows the car on screen. If the player begins to use the attractor weapon, their vehicle gains the speed of the targeted vehicle. The other car, however, does not lose any momentum. The attractor weapon is limited to a gauge similar to that of the fuel gauge. The attractor can be used constantly for about ten seconds, but the player may decide on how frequently they use it.
- Infrared is the only weapon not controlled by the player. The infrared is turned on in every nighttime race and off in every daytime race. When turned on, the screen is covered with a tone of red and it is much easier to see and avoid obstacles and cars.
- Boost is the only weapon that the player begins the game with, and the only weapon that is upgradeable. The boost weapon increases the car's speed for a limited time. Upgrading the boost weapon means the boost will be stronger and last longer. Beginning from boost level 4, it is possible to make the car gain speed again from the almost stopped state without fuel. The boost weapon is limited to four uses, but some bonuses in the race gives extra boost uses to the player.

=== Versus ===
In Versus Mode, up to four players can play with the addition of a multitap. The screen is always split four ways; if there are fewer than four players, AI opponents will form up the remainder. Each race is a stand-alone affair on a single track, with players choosing from four different speed/acceleration/boost combinations (similar to original Top Gear) before the race begins.

=== Passwords ===
Top Gear 3000 employs a password system which allows the player to resume gameplay after switching the console off. It restores all purchased upgrades and championship status. The password system can also be used for cheats, a common one which uses a B for the first three slots (BBB) to give the player millions of credits which then allows for all upgrades to be eventually purchased as they are developed. The game defaults to medium difficulty, which means that not all upgrades are ever developed. It begins at the second race. Other password cheats do exist.

== Reception ==
Reception

Review scores
Publication	Score
EP Daily	6.5/10
Game Informer	6.75/10
M! Games	63%
Mega Fun	65%
Total!	3-
Video Games (DE)	70%
Play Time	65%
Top Secret	4/5

Top Gear 3000 received average reviews. GamePro's Captain Squideo commented that the game is solidly made, but derivative. He elaborated that the weapons are not truly important to the action and that many of the outer space locales "look suspiciously Earthlike", leaving the "terrific" four-player mode as the only element setting the game apart from the many racers which preceded it.
