= Top Gear Hyper Bike =

2000 video game

- North American box art
- Developer: Snowblind Studios
- Publisher: Kemco
- Series: Top Gear
- Platform: Nintendo 64
- Release: JP: March 17, 2000; NA: March 21, 2000; EU: 2000
- Genre: Racing
- Modes: Single-player, multiplayer

Top Gear Hyper Bike (also spelled Hyper-Bike or Hyperbike) is a 2000 racing video game developed by Snowblind Studios and published by Kemco for the Nintendo 64. It features three gameplay modes: the Championship mode which has dirt and street tracks, the Time Attack mode where the player races against the clock, and a Trick Attack mode where the player can learn racing tricks that are present in the game. Hyper Bike also features a level editor where the player can modify dirt tracks. The game can be played alone or with a partner.

Released as a follow-up to Top Gear Overdrive (1998) and Top Gear Rally 2 (1999), the developer worked on making the motorcycle handling and animations more realistic and produced the sound effects of the motorcycle engines from real bikes. Initially, the multiplayer mode would have supported up to four players, though it was cut to two by the game's release. The gameplay, technical, visual, and audio aspects received mixed opinions from reviewers.

== Gameplay ==
A screenshot of Hyper Bike showing a player riding a motorcycle on a dirt path

Top Gear Hyper Bike is a racing video game that features three gameplay modes, six track layouts, and various motorcycles, such as dirt bikes and street bikes. There are bikes from well-known Japanese brands such as Kawasaki, Honda, and Yamaha; the player can change the color of their suit, as well as the bike they are riding. One of the gameplay modes, the Championship mode, has dirt and street tracks; players compete to earn points and obtain new bikes and levels. Another gameplay mode, Time Attack, is a single-player mode where the player races against the clock. Tracks often feature shortcuts, as well as checkpoints. The game saves the top five scores for each course. A Trick Attack mode is also present in the game, where the player can learn racing tricks that are present in the game.

In contrast to other racing games, the physics vary throughout the types of tracks. For example, dirt bikes can often be exploited, while street bikes often feature high speeds on narrow tracks. While racing, the player can earn turbo boost by doing various racing tricks. There are also power-ups.

There is also a CAD-like level editor that can be accessed with the Expansion Pak, which also enhances the game's graphics. There, the player can modify dirt tracks, such as to make them resemble the default tracks. Top Gear Hyper Bike has a single-player mode and a two-player multiplayer one. The game also supports Rumble Pak.

== Development and release ==
As a follow-up to Top Gear Overdrive (1998) and Top Gear Rally 2 (1999), Top Gear Hyper Bike was developed by Snowblind Studios and runs on an enhanced version of its engine. Kemco is the game's publisher. The game embraces elements of similar games in the genre, such as Motocross Madness (1998), Jeremy McGrath Supercross 98 (1998), and Moto Racer 2 (1998). It is also the first Top Gear title that features motocross and street bike racing.

To make the motorcycle handling and animations more realistic, the game's polygonal racers were segmented into six independent parts. The polygons are animated, bounce, and move with the bike while riding. The sound effects of the motorcycle engines were recorded from real bikes in a dealership; Christian A. Salyer and the company Sound Element took part in creating the music, featuring a rock soundtrack with vocals. Originally, the game was supposed to have a four-player multiplayer mode like Overdrive, however, it was cut to two upon the game's release.

The game was presented at the Electronic Entertainment Expo in 1999. Initially set to release in November 1999, the release date was moved to the first quarter of 2000, ultimately releasing in Japan on March 17, 2000 and in North America on March 21, 2000 for the Nintendo 64 game console. A European version was also released sometime throughout the year. Alongside the game, the box includes an instruction manual, registration card, and an information booklet.

== Reception ==
Reception

Aggregate score
Aggregator	Score
GameRankings	62%

Review scores
Publication	Score
AllGame	3.5/5
Electronic Gaming Monthly	6/10 7.5/10 5/10 7/10
Game Informer	7.25/10
GamePro	2/5
IGN	6.1/10
Nintendo Power	8.3/10

Top Gear Hyper Bike received "mixed" reviews according to the review aggregation website GameRankings.

Reviewers had mixed opinions on the gameplay. Aaron Boulding of IGN wrote that the good parts of Hyper Bike do not outweigh the bad ones, though he commended the game's controls when editing tracks and the physics engine. Jay Fitzloff of Game Informer also liked the controls, but complained about the nitro boosts, saying that they let the player easily win courses, and the lack of settings to adjust the bike motor. An Electronic Gaming Monthly (EGM) reviewer found the gameplay to be boring, criticizing the courses for being short and uninspiring and the shortcuts for being easy to find. In comparison with Beetle Adventure Racing (1999), the reviewer found Hyper Bike less enjoyable, saying that it lacks depth and substance. Scott McCall of AllGame found the track editor easy to use but limited and basic, calling it "a disappointing feature".

Critics also had mixed opinions about the technical and visual parts of the game. Another EGM reviewer praised the game engine, describing it as swift and effortless. In a preview of the game, IGN commented that the graphics were "extremely detailed, crisp and highly realistic", while also praising the animations of the polygons. However, Boulding, upon reviewing the full game, disliked the graphics and the six independent parts for not making the game look good, while adding that the textures are blurry. McCall and Fitzloff called the graphics foggy, with the former adding that the game features a small viewing distance and that in comparison with Overdrive, Hyper Bike has a blocky texture. GamePro described the presentation as bland and as having simple textures, while Nintendo Power commended the graphics for being sharp, but noted that some dirt tracks are hard to distinguish from the surrounding environment.

The soundtrack and sound effects were mostly criticized. Boulding had mixed comments about the music, saying that it is appropriate but that the player should not "get excited" about it. McCall praised the soundtrack, though describing it as unmemorable, and had mixed opinions on the sound effects, but praising the crashing effects. GamePro criticized the bike engine audio, while Nintendo Power called the soundtrack repetitive.
