= Kid Klown in Crazy Chase =

1994 video game

- North American Super NES box art
- Developer: Kemco
- Publishers: WW: Kemco; EU: Nintendo (SNES)
- Composers: Shinichi Furuta; Yumiko Orishige; Musica Presto
- Series: Kid Klown
- Platforms: Super NES, Game Boy Advance
- Release: Super NES: NA: September 1994; JP: October 21, 1994; EU: 1995; Game Boy Advance: EU: October 21, 2002; NA: October 23, 2002
- Genre: Platform game
- Mode: Single player

Kid Klown in Crazy Chase (キッドクラウンのクレイジーチェイス, Kiddo Kuraun no Kureijī Cheisu) is a platform video game developed and published by Kemco for the Super Nintendo Entertainment System. It was released in North America in September 1994, Japan on October 21, 1994 and in Europe in 1995. The game features the Kid Klown, the player character who is tasked with rescuing the Princess Honey from the villain Black Jack. Players view gameplay from an isometric perspective as Kid Klown pursues a lit fuse in order to stop it from reaching a spade bomb. The game was re-released for the Game Boy Advance as Crazy Chase and features 11 new levels and four mini-games. The re-release was released in Europe and North America in October 2002, while a release in Japan was planned but ultimately canceled. It was met with mixed reception from critics, who found it to be inferior to other games of its type. The game has a Japan-exclusive sequel Kid Klown in Crazy Chase 2: Love Love Hani Soudatsusen (Japanese: キッドクラウンのクレイジーチェイス2 〜ラヴ・ラヴ・ハニー争奪戦〜) released for the Sony PlayStation in 1996.

== Gameplay ==
Gameplay of Kid Klown in Crazy Chase

Players control the player character Kid Klown as he attempts to rescue Princess Honey from the villain Black Jack (Dirty Joe in the Japan SNES version and in the Game Boy Advance version). The game's graphics are presented in an isometric view as Kid Klown automatically moves down a path to thwart Black Jack's plans of blowing up one of his spade bombs in each level. Various obstacles cause Kid Klown to slow down if they collide with him; if Kid Klown does not make it to the bomb in time or if he is hit too many times, the level is lost. The game consists of 5 stages. In each stage, Kid Klown must find all 4 card suit orbs and stop the bomb to complete the level. At the end of each stage Kid Klown gets a key which in turn at the ending could be of use to unlock Honey's cage. If the player gets all 4 orbs in the very first turn, Kid Klown also gets a Honey heart. After the fifth stage, Kid Klown must find the correct lock out of the 10 locks to unlock Honey's cage.

There are 3 endings to the game:

- Good Ending: The player has collected all five Honey hearts and saved Honey from the cage without using a continue.
- Average Ending: The player saved Honey, but did not get all five Honey hearts, or did find all five but used a continue.
- Bad Ending: The player failed to save Honey.

In the Game Boy Advance re-release, the developers added 11 new levels and four unlockable mini-games.

== Development and release ==
Kid Klown in Crazy Chase was developed and published by Kemco for the Super NES and Game Boy Advance platforms. While the Super NES version was first released in Europe in 1995, in North America in September 1994, and in Japan on October 21, 1994, the Game Boy Advance re-release was released in October 21 and 23, 2002 in Europe and North America, respectively. The Game Boy Advance version was first revealed at E3 2001, where Kemco commented that the current build was 60% complete and would be released in Summer 2001 for Japan and November 2001 for North America. Both releases were delayed several times and the Japanese version ultimately canceled. Before release, it was featured at both E3 2002 and the 2002 Tokyo Game Show.

== Reception ==
Reception

Review scores
Publication	Score
Electronic Gaming Monthly	8/10, 7/10, 8/10, 7/10, 8/10
Famitsu	8/10, 7/10, 7/10, 6/10
Nintendo Life	5/10

Kid Klown in Krazy Chase received mixed reception. It holds an aggregate score of 64.17% on GameRankings based on three reviews. Electronic Gaming Monthly summarized that "this one requires a lot of skill and technique, but the various antics and animations (especially on Kidd's enemy) are incredibly lifelike and make this one of the better games around." In Famitsu, two reviewers also complimented on the graphics with one saying all the gags in the game would have player smiling. Although the same two reviewers said the game needed more stages, a third reviewer said they could not get used to perspective of the gameplay, while another said it was only fun to watch someone else play for the gags yet actively playing it was not fun.

IGN called the Super NES version overlooked and described it as a "zany" game that "boasts stellar colors and some really frantic animation". Eurogamer's Tom Bramwell described the video game J.J. & Jeff as a "poor man's Plok/Kid Klown in Crazy Chase/Putty Squad/etc". Edge compared Let's Tap to Kid Klown due to the similar challenges found in Let's Tap's multi-player mode. Nintendo Life's Andrew Donaldson commented that while not a bad game, there's no reason to play it due to a lack of levels and an abundance of games that do what it does better.

The Game Boy Advance version was met with similar reception. Nintendo Power gave it a 3.2 out of 5, lower than the Super NES version's score. IGN noted that the Game Boy Advance version "gave both good and bad impressions about Kemco's abilities to port SNES to the handheld" and that the multi-player mode will get it its "dues". They gave specific criticism to the early build of Crazy Chase due to the stiff controls and delayed jump. They also criticized the animation for being less fluid than the Super NES version's. GamePro's Fennec Fox called the Super NES game "semi-obscure", while fellow GamePro writer DJ Dinobot criticized the Game Boy Advance's preview build for Crazy Chase for its controls were "harder to steer than a 1976 Pinto with a flat tire".

== See also ==
- List of Kemco games
