= Top Gear: Dare Devil =

2000 video game

- North American cover art
- Developer: Papaya Studio
- Publisher: Kemco
- Series: Top Gear
- Platform: PlayStation 2
- Release: NA: December 19, 2000; JP: January 18, 2001
- Genre: Racing
- Modes: Single-player, multiplayer

Top Gear: Dare Devil is a racing video game for the PlayStation 2. It was developed by Papaya Studio and published by Kemco in 2000.

== Gameplay ==
This game consists of single-player and multiplayer. In single-player, the player drives around one of four cities, Rome, London, Tokyo and San Francisco - collecting Dare Devil Coins. If all Coins in a level are collected, the player unlocks a secret car. What also can be collected are keys and wrenches that open up bonus missions. After winning a bonus mission, the player can unlock a paint job for the car used.

The player can also free roam around cities under a 5 minute timer.

== Reception ==
Reception

Aggregate score
Aggregator	Score
Metacritic	62/100

Review scores
Publication	Score
Electronic Gaming Monthly	6.33/10 (Note: In Electronic Gaming Monthly's viewpoint of the game, two critics gave it each a score of 6.5/10, and the other gave it 6/10.)
EP Daily	8/10
Famitsu	24/40
Game Informer	2/10
GamesMaster	6/10
GameSpot	4.3/10
IGN	6/10
Next Generation	3/5
Official U.S. PlayStation Magazine	3.5/5
PlayStation: The Official Magazine	6/10

Top Gear: Dare Devil received "mixed or average" reviews according to the review aggregation website Metacritic. Ryan Davis of GameSpot was critical to the game's physics engine, lack of gameplay variations, and frame rate issues. IGN also gave low marks and considered more as a rental game, a sentiment in which NextGen's David Chen also agreed. In Japan, Famitsu gave it a score of 24 out of 40. Four-Eyed Dragon of GamePro said that the game with its problematic physics and gameplay will provide the players an "unforgiving" headache. (Note: GamePro gave the game 5/5 for graphics, two 3/5 scores for sound and control, and 2.5/5 for fun factor.)
