= Top Gear GT Championship =

2001 video game

- North American cover art featuring a Toyota Supra JGTC and Nissan Loctite Zexel GT-R and Castrol MUGEN NSX
- Developer: Kemco
- Publisher: Kemco
- Series: Top Gear
- Platform: Game Boy Advance
- Release: JP: March 21, 2001; EU: June 21, 2001; NA: July 9, 2001
- Genre: Racing
- Modes: Single-player, multiplayer

Top Gear GT Championship, known in Japan as Zen Nihon GT Senshuken (全日本GT選手権; lit. "All-Japan GT Championship"), is a racing game developed and published by Kemco for the Game Boy Advance and released in 2001. The game was a launch title in Japan and Europe for the Game Boy Advance, and was the first Game Boy Advance game in the Top Gear series. The Japanese release was compatible with the Mobile Adapter GB accessory.

== Reception ==
Reception

Aggregate score
Aggregator	Score
GameRankings	55%

Review scores
Publication	Score
Edge	4/10
Electronic Gaming Monthly	4.33/10 (Note: Three critics of Electronic Gaming Monthly gave the game each a score of 4.5/10, 3.5/10, and 5/10.)
Famitsu	21/40
Gamekult	2/10
GamesMaster	65%
GameSpot	5.9/10
Next Generation	2/5
Nintendo Power	2.5/5

The game received mixed reviews. NextGen said of the game, "Great paint job, but the engine's not running on all cylinders." In Japan, Famitsu gave it a score of 21 out of 40.
