= Snowblind Studios =

American video game developer

- Type: Subsidiary
- Industry: Video games
- Founded: 1997; 29 years ago
- Defunct: 2012; 14 years ago
- Fate: Merged into Monolith Productions
- Successor: Monolith Productions
- Headquarters: Kirkland, Washington, U.S.
- Parent: Warner Bros. Interactive Entertainment (2009–2012)
- Website: snowblind.com (archived)

Snowblind Studios was an American video game developer located in Kirkland, Washington. They were founded in 1997, specializing in role-playing video games.

In February 2009, Snowblind Studios was acquired by Warner Bros. Home Entertainment. Originally located in Bothell, Washington, after the Warner Bros. acquisition, the studio was relocated to Kirkland. Following the release of The Lord of the Rings: War in the North, the studio was merged in with Monolith Productions in 2012.

== Game engine ==
The Snowblind engine, also referred to as the Dark Alliance game engine, is a game engine created by Snowblind Studios for perspective correct overhead third person view role-playing games. It was first used by Snowblind Studios to create Baldur's Gate: Dark Alliance. The previous Baldur's Gate games used the Infinity Engine which was created by BioWare for isometric role-playing games.

The first game to use the engine was Baldur's Gate: Dark Alliance, a joint collaboration between Interplay Entertainment and Snowblind Studios. Interplay then used the engine for all its ports of the game except the Game Boy Advance version, which used its own game engine. These ports of the game greatly expanded on how much content the game was able to use and the amount of save slots present in the game.

The engine was then used by Snowblind Studios in its EverQuest games starting with Champions of Norrath. Snowblind improved the engine in its own ways, such as adding new features such as character creation and online multiplayer. Interplay, however, continued to use the engine, due to the fact it partly owned the engine, for its console games. Interplay used the engine for its sequel to Dark Alliance, Baldur's Gate: Dark Alliance II, which was developed by Black Isle Studios. This sequel once again improved on the engine's capabilities and added more features, improved graphics and better audio; it added features from the Infinity Engine Baldur's Gate games such as Companions. Interplay then released Fallout: Brotherhood of Steel and The Bard's Tale; both games improved on the engine in their own way. Brotherhood of Steel added a reputation system to the game and The Bard's Tale improved on other features of the engine, such as audio. The Bard's Tale was the Dark Alliance Engine's first PC release. Interplay was developing a sequel to Brotherhood of Steel, Fallout: Brotherhood of Steel 2. This game would have added the features of sniping, stealth and a more advanced reputation system, but was soon canceled.

Snowblind Studios then released Champions: Return to Arms, which refined the online multiplayer and changed the linear portion of the games released for the engine and allowed characters to change the ending. Around this time, Snowblind began to license the engine out to indie developers, but only one could make a game. The game was met with a lawsuit by Titus Software, the owners of Interplay, and Acclaim Entertainment but in the end, it was ultimately released as Combat Elite: WWII Paratroopers.

Snowblind then created Justice League Heroes with the same engine in 2006. The game was released around the time the next gen of video game consoles was out, but due to it being created for the previous gen, it was released for Xbox and PlayStation 2. A portable version of the engine was used for the PlayStation Portable. The Game Boy Advance version, which was released as Justice League Heroes: The Flash, used its own engine, and the Nintendo DS version did the same thing. To fit the superhero theme of the game, Snowblind Studios put most of its effort into the length of the game, thereby taking out many features of the engine.

== Games developed ==
Year	Title	Platform(s)
1998	Top Gear Overdrive	Nintendo 64
2000	Top Gear Hyper Bike	Nintendo 64
2001	Baldur's Gate: Dark Alliance	PlayStation 2, Xbox
2004	Champions of Norrath: Realms of EverQuest	PlayStation 2
2005	Champions: Return to Arms	PlayStation 2
2006	Justice League Heroes	PlayStation 2, Xbox, PlayStation Portable
2011	The Lord of the Rings: War in the North	PlayStation 3, Xbox 360, Microsoft Windows
