= Ghost Lion =

1989 video game

- Westernized cover art
- Developer: Kemco
- Publisher: Kemco
- Composer: Hiroyuki Masuno
- Platform: NES
- Release: JP: July 14, 1989; NA: October 1992
- Genre: Role-playing
- Mode: Single-player

Ghost Lion, known in Japan as White Lion Densetsu: Pyramid no Kanata ni (ホワイトライオン伝説 ―ピラミッドの彼方に―, Waito Raion Densetsu -Piramiddo no kanata ni-; White Lion Legend: Beyond the Pyramid), is a 1989 role-playing video game released by Kemco for the Nintendo Entertainment System. The game is a loose adaptation of the 1988 film of the same name

== Gameplay ==
Ghost Lion draws from traditional elements of role-playing games from its era, while innovating with several unique new systems. Similar to other role-playing games released around the same time period, Ghost Lion offers an exploratory open-world environment, but its story follows a largely linear progression.

The standout feature of Ghost Lion is its unique combat system. The protagonist, Maria, can fight enemies directly but can also use items to summon spirits that battle alongside her. A departure from the standard RPG trope, combat in Ghost Lion awards currency but eschews the common experience point system. Instead, players improve Maria's Hope (Level), Courage (HP), and Dream (MP) statistics by discovering 'Miracles' hidden in treasure chests scattered throughout the world.

The control of Maria is implemented using the D-pad for movement and the A and B buttons for interactions and menu navigation. Combat unfolds in a turn-based and menu-driven style, echoing games from the Dragon Quest series.

Ghost Lion has a strong narrative focus. Dialogues with NPCs and interactions within the game world play a pivotal role in progressing the story, despite its linear structure.

Rather than using specific NPCs or inns, saving the game and healing the character are executed at fairy springs located throughout the game world.

== Plot ==
Ghost Lion begins when a ghostly White Lion attacked Maria's village. A hero appeared and drove the lion away, but Maria's parents wanted to find out where the Lion came from and what its purpose was. They set out on a journey, and never returned. The player takes control when, one day, Maria decides to go look for them. As she begins her journey, a bridge gives way beneath her, and she is washed away by a strong river current. She awakens in a strange new world and must find her lost parents and a way home, while looking for the mysterious White Lion.

== Reception ==
Upon the game's release, the game received a total score of 25/40 from the four reviewers at Famitsu. Nintendo Power called the game a "good, solid entry in the role-playing category". The review found the game similar to the Dragon Quest series, and made note of its female heroine as the game's "biggest difference".

Retrospectively, Game Informer gave it a score of 6.5/10, opining that "the ability to summon spirits is neat, but the game's bland art style and repetitive nature fail to amount to anything worth mentioning. If it weren't for the chick who looks like a dude on the [North American] cover, Legend of the Ghost Lion would be lost to obscurity forever." In an article about Dragon Quest clones, the staff of 1UP.com called it "a strange game where every part that wasn't taken directly from Dragon Quest was straight out of a fever dream."
