= Knife Edge: Nose Gunner =

1998 video game

- North American Nintendo 64 cover art
- Developer(s): Kemco
- Publisher(s): Kemco
- Platform(s): Nintendo 64
- Release: NA: November 10, 1998; JP: November 27, 1998; EU: 1998
- Genre(s): 3D rail shooter
- Mode(s): Single-player, multiplayer

Knife Edge: Nose Gunner (Note: (Japanese: ナイフエッジ 〜ノーズカンナー〜, Hepburn: Naifu Ejji 〜Nōzu Gannā〜)), known in Europe as Knife Edge, is a 1998 3D rail shooter game developed and published by Kemco for Nintendo 64.

== Plot ==
The game describes a "New Frontier Plan" announced by the United States at the end of the 20th century: an ambitious program to enable humans to migrate to Mars. The United States Congress approved an enormous budget for the National Aeronautics and Space Agency to initiate development of this program. Other technologically advanced countries also participated in the plan. Through an unprecedented cooperative effort, the New Frontier Plan members had built an orbiting space station; life on Mars would soon be a reality.

This plan for developing Mars was officially named the "Mars Frontier Project" (MFP). At the end of the 21st century, a domed structure called the "Plant" was built on Martian soil, and colonization finally began. The first wave of colonists applied themselves to terraforming the planet for human survival, adjusting the atmosphere and securing water resources.

Half a century passed. On Mars, the air was breathable, and oceans formed as the southern ice caps continued to melt. Trees and shrubs gradually flourished; Mars was evolving from a planet of red dust into a lush, green environment. At the beginning of the fifth emigration wave, MFP officials received an alarming report from the Martian colonists, saying that unknown lifeforms were coming to one of the colonies.

Upon receiving the reports, key government officials on Earth were alarmed. To protect the colonists, the United Nations established a military relay station on the Martian moon Phobos and built a military post on Mars itself. This was the opportunity that restless armed forces worldwide had been awaiting. One day troops patrolling an undeveloped part of Mars discovered ancient ruins with what appeared to be signs of alien life. A reconnaissance unit was immediately dispatched; they reported that the ruins were of a civilization destroyed around the 11th century, Earth time. One theory was that the restored atmosphere had awakened the previously dormant Martian creatures, who had been sighted in the area in the past.

Soon after this the trouble began. First, communications from one of the other colonies was suddenly cut off. Then, one after another, each of the other colonies as well as the military post lost all communication channels. An investigative party could leave immediately from Earth but would require several days to reach Mars. The United Nations therefore ordered a test squadron for a new type of experimental assault aircraft, stationed on Phobos, to investigate and eliminate the disturbances on Mars.

Soon after the squadron was airborne, transfer station monitors received the final communication from the military post on Mars: "Mayday! Mayday! What is that?! It's crawling on the surface… It's attacking!! Mayday, mayday!"

== Characters ==
Michael Samson
(Second Lieutenant, American)
A young gunner sent to investigate the trouble on Mars. As the gunner, he rides in the automatically piloted experimental aircraft and blasts the enemy. Although he has an impulsive side, he burns with a sense of duty and will bravely stand up against the attacking enemy.

Gregory MacKenzie
(Wing Commander, British)
Samson's commanding officer who gives the player instructions and information from the relay station on the Martian moon, Phobos. A classic career British military member, he is calm and composed, and his subordinates unquestionably trust his judgement. While in active service, MacKenzie won fame for his bravery as the top pilot in the Royal Space Force.

Dr. Linx
(Exo-archeobiologist)
A noted scientist specializing in ancient alien theoretical biology. Linx was sent to the military post on Mars as an archeological researcher. She survived the enemy attack that destroyed her research colony. Because of this experience, Linx has valuable information about the enemy invader.

== Gameplay ==
Knife Edge is for one to four players. The player, while moving between the locations of the game in the Knife Edge ship, controls a cursor that fires vulcan cannon bullets. When more than one player is playing each cursor is color-coded to distinguish them. As well as the regular gun, there is the option for a secondary weapon. Hints are provided by a commanding officer over the communication system.

Movement of the vehicle is clearly predetermined, but the player is given some ability to move in the form of the four C-buttons on the Nintendo 64 controller. When a button is depressed the ship will move slightly in the corresponding direction. This is used primarily to avoid obstacles and attacks.

== Reception ==
Reception

Aggregate score
Aggregator	Score
GameRankings	58%

Review scores
Publication	Score
Consoles +	79%
Electronic Gaming Monthly	5.5/10
Famitsu	22/40
Game Informer	3/10
GamePro	3/5
GameSpot	4.9/10
IGN	4.6/10
Jeuxvideo.com	13/20
N64 Magazine	42%
Nintendo Power	6.7/10
Video Games (DE)	40%

The game received mixed reviews according to the review aggregation website GameRankings. Nintendo Power gave it a mixed review, months before it was released Stateside. IGN criticized the presentation and the graphics of the game, stating that it was blurry, bland, boring and slow. N64 Magazine dismissed it as "a light gun game without a light gun". In Japan, Famitsu gave it a score of 22 out of 40.
