= Desert Commander =

1988 video game

- Developer: Kemco
- Publisher: Kemco
- Composer: Hiroyuki Masuno
- Platform: Nintendo Entertainment System
- Release: JP: 28 April 1988; NA: June 1989
- Genre: Turn-based strategy
- Modes: Single-player, multiplayer

Desert Commander (Note: Also known as Desert Fox: Tank Strategy (Japanese: 砂漠の狐 戦車戦略, Hepburn: Sabaku no Kitsune: Sensha Senryaku) in Japan.) is a 1988 turn-based strategy video game developed and published by Kemco in Japan and North America for the Nintendo Entertainment System. It is themed after the North African theatre of World War II in the 1940s, where players take command of the Allied Forces led by George S. Patton and Bernard Montgomery to fight against the Axis powers led by Erwin Rommel. Its gameplay consists of moving units into positions to confront enemies in turn-based encounters determined by multiple factors, replenishing units with resources to occupy the enemy headquarters or destroy all enemy forces. The title garnered positive reception from critics; Reviewers praised several aspects such as the presentation, visuals, controls, challenge and balance of strategy and action, though others criticized certain design choices while fan reception proved to be mixed in Japan.

== Gameplay ==

Top: Preparing to move a unit.
Bottom: An attack sequence.

Desert Commander is a World War II-themed turn-based strategy game where players assume command of the Allied Forces led by Generals George S. Patton and Bernard Montgomery across five increasingly difficult scenarios that take place in the 1940s, each one giving a pre-determined set number of units to use, to fight against the Axis Powers led by Erwin Rommel. Available modes of play include the main single-player campaign and a two-player versus mode.

The main gameplay objective is to either occupy the enemy headquarters or destroy all opposing forces on the playfield and the player that does so first wins. Players command their units on a map, using a command window function, and each unit have different mobility range that varies according to their type except aircraft units in addition of possessing different shooting range. Terrain plays an important role during battle sequences, as it can affect the outcome of encounters in terms of terrestrial unit's movility, attack and defense (except for aircraft). Each scenario has no time limit and gives a different set number of units to use, which the players can mix and match between the different types without going over that limit. When playing against the CPU, the computer will be given a different ratio of units to command from the player. On the easiest scenario, both the player and the CPU have the same number of units, while in all others the CPU will have more than the player. There is no variance in artificial intelligence, so the only thing that makes the later maps harder is the larger number of units the CPU has. When in a one-player game, the second controller can be used to modify the CPU forces. Prior to a two-player match, players can also customize the number of units at their disposal.

The player's force consists of nine different types of units and one headquarters unit (which is a unit by itself and also can be used to attack). A certain unit is particularly strong or weak against a particular opponent, performing average against every other unit type. Units cannot be produced, but players can replenish them by landing at the appropriate buildings or be resupplied by a supply truck; for example, all aircraft must stop at an airport in order to recharge their fuel and ammo supply. Transport units are also available to carry infantry units across the map.

== Synopsis ==
World War II began when the German army of Adolf Hitler invaded Poland through the use of the infamous blitzkrieg technique. By June 1940, France formally surrendered to Nazi Germany; making Germany the strongest nation in Continental Europe. Benito Mussolini, the dictator of Fascist Italy had signed a military alliance with Germany at the time. He looked at this opportunity to transform the Mediterranean Sea into an "Italian Lake." Axis forces managed to deliver their invading troops to Egypt by September 1940. However, the Italian army was instantly defeated by the British counterattackers who had a duty to protect Egypt. Germany was determined to help Italy win their conflict while preparing for their fateful campaign in the Soviet Union at the same time.

== Development and release ==
Desert Commander was first released in Japan by Kemco on 28 April 1988 and later in North America in June 1989. The soundtrack was composed by Hiroyuki Masuno. Prior to its launch in the North American market, the game was titled Desert Tank Force before being renamed to Desert Commander. It was showcased multiple times at the Summer and Winter editions of Consumer Electronics Show from 1988 to 1989 respectively. In the campaign in the original Japanese version, the player takes command of the Afrika Korps as Erwin Rommel against Bernard Montgomery's British forces. Then, on the result screen after the victory, Adolf Hitler praises the player. For the North American release, the factions were not named and the conflict remained opaque. On 24 April 2013, the title's soundtrack was included as part of the ROM Cassette Disc in KEMCO music album by City Connection's Clarice Disk label.

== Reception ==
Reception

Review scores
Publication	Score
AllGame	3/5
Famitsu	23/40
Nintendo Power	15/20
Computer Entertainer	3.5/4
VideoGame	4/5

Desert Commander was met with positive reception from critics. Nintendo Power praised the audiovisual presentation, controls, challenge and thematic. Computer Entertainer recommended the game for strategy fans and commended its visual presentation, stating that "Wargaming fans have long been out there and now Nintendo wargamers have something to bite into." Game Players' William R. Trotter regarded it as entertaining, giving positive comments to the simulation of terrain effect on movement but criticized the cartoon-like battle sequences and various drawbacks. Brazilian magazine VideoGame also gave positive remarks to the difficulty, graphics and sound design. However, public reception was mixed: in a poll taken by Japanese publication Family Computer Magazine, it received a score of 17.19 out of 30. AllGame's Skyler Miller noted its balance between strategy and action, quick turns and easy-to-use interface in a positive light, although he remarked that the game is not very detailed for hardcore players, stating that "Desert Commander is a good choice for board game fans and those who like more thoughtful entertainment."
