= Top Gear (video game series) =

Racing video game series

- Original logo
- Genre: Racing
- Publishers: Kemco, QUByte Interactive
- Platforms: Super NES, Genesis, Amiga, CD32, Nintendo 64, PlayStation 2, Game Boy Color, Game Boy Advance, Nintendo DS, PlayStation 4, PlayStation 5, Xbox One, Xbox Series X and Series S, Nintendo Switch, Windows
- First release: Top Gear; 27 March 1992
- Latest release: Top Racer Collection; 7 March 2024

Top Gear (also known as Top Racer) is a racing video game series published by Kemco. It is unrelated to the BBC TV series of the same name.

== Games ==
=== Console games ===
- Top Gear (SNES, 1992)
- Top Gear 2 (SNES, 1993)
- Top Gear 2 (SEGA Genesis, Amiga, CD32, 1994)
- Top Gear 3000 (SNES, 1995)
- Top Gear Rally (N64, 1997)
- Top Gear Overdrive (N64, 1998)
- Top Gear Rally 2 (N64, 1999)
- Top Gear Hyper Bike (N64, 2000)
- Top Gear: Dare Devil (PS2, 2000)
- RPM Tuning (PS2, 2004)
- Top Racer Collection (PS4, PS5, Xbox One, Xbox Series X|S, Switch, Windows, 2024)

=== Handheld games ===
- Top Gear Pocket (GBC, 1999)
- Top Gear Pocket 2 (GBC, 2000)
- Top Gear GT Championship (GBA, 2001)
- Top Gear Rally (GBA, 2003)
- Super Speed Machines (DS, 2010)
