= The Sword of Hope =

1989 video game

- North American box art
- Developer: Kemco
- Publishers: JP: Kemco; NA: Seika Corporation
- Series: The Sword of Hope
- Platform: Game Boy
- Release: JP: December 28, 1989; NA: June 1991; EU: 1991
- Genre: Role-playing
- Mode: Single-player

The Sword of Hope, released in Japan as Selection: Erabareshi Mono, (Note: Japanese: セレクション 選ばれし者, Hepburn: Serekushon Erabareshi Mono; Selection: The Chosen One) is a role-playing video game developed and published by Kemco for the Game Boy. It was released in 1989 in Japan and 1991 internationally.

In 1992, it received a sequel, The Sword of Hope II. These two games were rereleased in Japan as a single Game Boy cartridge, Selection I & II, on May 1, 1998. The Sword of Hope was also released for the Nintendo 3DS' Virtual Console in Japan on December 7, 2011 and the Nintendo Classics service for the Nintendo Switch on May 23, 2025. Another sequel titled Selection (セレクション) was released for mobile phones on 2008.

== Summary ==
The player assumes the role of Prince Theo whose father, King Hennessy has been corrupted by an evil dragon. He has enslaved the kingdom and exiled the great wisemen who once maintained the balance and prosperity of the kingdom. Theo's mother, Queen Remy, was killed by Hennessy but Theo was rescued from the castle without harm with the help of an old sage. Now that Theo has reached his teenage years and become a skilled warrior it is time for Theo to face his destiny and return to the castle where he was raised and free his father from the evil dragon.

Each boss has his own weakness; exploiting it to defeat him is completely up to the player.
