= Justice League Heroes =

- North American Xbox cover art
- Developers: Snowblind Studios; Sensory Sweep Studios (DS)
- Publisher: Warner Bros. Interactive Entertainment
- Engine: Snowblind
- Platforms: PlayStation 2, Xbox, PlayStation Portable, Nintendo DS
- Release: DS, PlayStation 2, Xbox: NA: October 17, 2006; EU: November 24, 2006; EU: December 8, 2006 (DS); AU: December 22, 2006; PlayStation Portable: NA: November 22, 2006; EU: December 8, 2006; AU: December 22, 2006
- Genre: Action role-playing
- Modes: Single-player, multiplayer

Justice League Heroes is a 2006 console video game for the PlayStation 2 and Xbox platforms. It was developed by Snowblind Studios, published by Warner Bros. Interactive Entertainment in conjunction with DC Comics and was distributed in Europe by Eidos Interactive. Based on the long-running comic book series Justice League, it was written by comic book writer Dwayne McDuffie. It uses the Snowblind Studios game engine.

Three handheld Justice League Heroes games were released at the same time for the Game Boy Advance, Nintendo DS and PlayStation Portable. The Nintendo DS game shares a similar visual style and gameplay mechanics to the console game and serves as a prequel to its story. Justice League Heroes: The Flash focuses on the Flash, with its events occurring concurrently to the main game.

== Gameplay ==
Justice League Heroes features two player cooperative gameplay. Seven heroes are initially available to players, with others being unlockable.

The game features most of the best known superheroes from the DC Universe, including Superman, Batman, and Wonder Woman among others. Each level consists of two members of the Justice League battling a variety of villains and their henchmen. When the game is being played by a single player, the player can freely switch between playing as either of the two Justice League members at any time. In a two player game, the players can only switch which characters they control by mutual consent. There was another Justice League game in development from Midway Games that was canceled in 2004 but, according to Warner Bros., this game is unrelated to the current project.

Upon starting a new game, the player has immediate access to Superman, Batman, Wonder Woman, The Flash, John Stewart (Green Lantern), Martian Manhunter, and Zatanna, but more characters and costumes can be unlocked as the game progresses. These unlockable characters can only be used on levels in which the players can choose which characters to take whereas the costumes can be used at any time.

The game has three initial difficulties, Easy, Medium, and Hard, and two unlockable difficulties: Elite and Superhero. In each successive difficulty level, enemies do more damage and have more health.

== Plot ==
Superman and Batman foil a S.T.A.R. Labs ambush by robots controlled by Brainiac. After Batman and Superman defeat what they think is Brainiac, they discover that they have been diverted by a duplicate while another has raided the vaults of S.T.A.R. Labs. Meanwhile, Zatanna and Martian Manhunter face off against Queen Bee and her drones, who are being assisted in their gradual conversion of Metropolis by some of Brainiac's robots. After Metropolis has been saved, the League respond to a series of attempted nuclear missile hijackings. Despite the League's efforts, one missile is launched undetected during a worldwide communications blackout caused by Brainiac.

The League realizes that the missile has been upgraded; capable of breaking Earth's orbit, it has been fired at Mars in an effort to free the White Martians. Superman and Martian Manhunter travel to Mars to stop them from escaping, but this has been yet another diversion from Brainiac who, anticipating their success, took the opportunity to steal vital equipment from the White Martians. Brainiac has also freed Gorilla Grodd from imprisonment, who intends to take revenge on his jailers and humanity. While Wonder Woman assists Superman in stopping the few White Martian vessels that escaped Mars and Martian Manhunter returns to the Watchtower, the rest of the League work together with Solovar to stop Grodd. Alone on the Watchtower, Martian Manhunter is ambushed by Doomsday, who imprisons him and takes control of the Watchtower while Brainiac steals a Mother Box from the League's vaults. Regrouping in an emergency bunker, the League manage to retake the Watchtower, free Martian Manhunter, and defeat Doomsday before confronting the real Brainiac in Siberia.

Seemingly defeated, Brainiac suddenly returns to life as his Mother Box activates. Brainiac is disintegrated by Darkseid, who had been manipulating him and has been released from an interdimensional prison. Confronting the League, Darkseid banishes all of them except Superman to another dimension with his Omega Beams. Darkseid proceeds to transform Earth into a new Apokolips and holds Superman in a kryptonite prison. The rest of the League land in an alternate dimension, but regroup and return to Earth, where they rescue Superman and defeat Darkseid. Darkseid is returned to his prison, restoring Earth to normal.

== Characters ==
=== Playable characters ===
- Arthur Curry / Aquaman^{b}
- Bruce Wayne / Batman^{c}
- Dinah Lance / Black Canary^{a}^{e}
- Wally West / The Flash
- Oliver Queen / Green Arrow^{a}^{b}
- Hal Jordan / Green Lantern^{f}
- John Stewart / Green Lantern^{b}
- Kyle Rayner / Green Lantern^{f}
- Kendra Saunders / Hawkgirl^{b}
- Helena Bertinelli / Huntress^{b}
- J'onn J'onzz / Martian Manhunter^{a}^{d}
- Linda Danvers / Supergirl^{e}
- Kal-El / Clark Kent / Superman^{a}
- Diana Prince / Wonder Woman^{a}
- Zatanna^{b}

=== Villains ===
- Brainiac
- Circe^{g}
- Darkseid^{h}
- Doomsday^{h}
- The General^{g}
- Gorilla Grodd
- Killer Frost^{f}
- The Key^{i}
- Prometheus^{g}
- Queen Bee^{i}
- White Martians^{h}
- Zoom^{g}

^a "Striker" in the Game Boy Advance version
^b "Striker" in the Nintendo DS version
^c Appears as a non-player character in the Game Boy Advance version
^d Appears as a non-player character in the Nintendo DS version
^e Exclusive to the PSP version
^f Does not appear in the Nintendo DS version
^g Exclusive to the Game Boy Advance and Nintendo DS versions
^h Exclusive to the PSP, PS2 and Xbox versions
^i Does not appear in the Game Boy Advance version

Each of the seven main characters has two unlockable costumes, with Superman and Wonder Woman having three. These alternative costumes alter the character's stats by small amounts and recreate classic or alternative costumes from the character's history.

== Reception ==
Reception

Aggregate score
Aggregator	Score
Metacritic	PS2: 68/100; XBOX: 68/100; PSP: 72/100; DS: 43/100

Review scores
Publication	Score
GameSpot	7.6/10 (PSP)
IGN	6.4/10 (PS2)

The PS2, Xbox and PSP versions received "mixed or average" reviews according to the review aggregation website Metacritic.

The PlayStation Portable version was praised for customization and co-op game play. It also received better reviews by both fans and critics than the console versions. The game was unfavorably compared to the similar multiplayer Marvel games X-Men Legends and Marvel: Ultimate Alliance, which allow the player to choose any character on any level, while Justice League Heroes contains several levels where the choice was taken away.

The DS version was not well received, with Nintendo Power giving it a 3.5, GameSpot a 5/10 and IGN a 4.4.
