= Mech Platoon =

2001 video game

- Developer: Kemco
- Publisher: Kemco
- Platform: Game Boy Advance
- Release: EU: November 28, 2001; JP: November 30, 2001; NA: December 20, 2001
- Genre: Real-time strategy
- Modes: Single-player, multiplayer

Mech Platoon, known in Japan as Kikaika Gunta - Mech Platoon (Japanese: 機械化軍隊 - メックプラトゥーン, Hepburn: Kikaika Gunta - Mekku Puratūn; lit. "Mechanical Army - Mech Platoon") is a real-time strategy video game developed and published by Kemco. It was the first real-time strategy game released on the Game Boy Advance platform, and was released in 2001.

== Gameplay ==
Screenshot of a battle in Mech Platoon.

Mech Platoon follows real-time strategy gaming standards, and is in the vein of other games such as StarCraft and Command & Conquer. The player assumes the role of an army commander for one of three in-game nations, and must battle on five planets each with multiple missions. In a battle, the player utilizes resources on a battlefield to build a base and attempt to overrun their opponent with "Mechs", the units featured in the game. There are three different types of resources found in the game: Energy Sand, Material Rock, and Laser Crystal. Resources are used to purchase units, and lower-grade resources such as sand can be used to buy more expensive resources such as rock and crystal.

Due to Game Boy Advance hardware limitations, there is a 30-unit maximum per stage and no fog of war. There are twenty standard mechs that are unlocked throughout the game to use during battles, but each of these are customizable with different variants. Each mech also has its own attributes, ranging from differing hit points to varying levels of attacks.

== Development ==
The game was first displayed to the public at E3 2001, where critics were impressed by the game's graphics but noted problems with unit path finding. A later build was shown at the European Computer Trade Show in September 2001.

== Reception ==
Reception

Aggregate score
Aggregator	Score
Metacritic	77 of 100

Review scores
Publication	Score
Game Informer	8.25 of 10
GamePro	3.5 of 5
GameSpot	8.3 of 10
GameSpy	70%
GameZone	7 of 10
Nintendo Power	3.9 of 5

Mech Platoon received "generally favorable reviews" according to the review aggregation website Metacritic.

GameSpot lauded Mech Platoon for its graphics and standard real-time strategy conventions on a portable system, writing, "Mech Platoon compromises nothing compared with stalwart veterans like Starcraft or Command & Conquer." GameSpy praised the game for its level selection and detailed graphics. GamePro noted, "[Mech Platoon] boasts lots of nifty features and a few annoying flaws that keep it from beating up on its bigger PC cousins."

Criticism generally focused on the game's sound and the problems with a portable real-time strategy game. GameSpot noted, "[the game's audio] is composed of mostly ear-wrenching midi music with a smattering of crisp digitized sound effects." GameSpy compared Mech Platoon unfavorably against turn-based strategy games on the Game Boy Advance, such as Nintendo's Advance Wars.
