= Top Gear 2 =

1993 video game

- European SNES box art
- Developer: Gremlin Interactive
- Publishers: Kemco (SNES); Vic Tokai (Genesis); Gremlin Interactive (Amiga)
- Series: Top Gear
- Platforms: Super NES, Sega Genesis, Amiga, Amiga CD32
- Release: Super NES: NA: September 1993; JP: December 22, 1993; PAL: 1993; Sega Genesis: NA: 1994; Amiga, Amiga CD32: EU: September 1994
- Genre: Racing
- Modes: Single-player, multiplayer

Top Gear 2 (released as Top Racer 2 in Japan) is a racing video game developed and published by Gremlin Interactive. A direct sequel to the 1992 game Top Gear, it was first released by Kemco for the SNES in North America in September 1993, and then the Super Famicom in Japan on December 22. It was later ported to the Amiga and Amiga CD32 in September 1994 by Gremlin Interactive, and to the Sega Genesis sometime the same year by Vic Tokai. While more realistic than its predecessor, Top Gear 2 maintained the arcade-style gameplay the series is known for.

== Gameplay ==
Scene from the Munich track

For the sequel, like the original, Gremlin used rehashed graphics and gameplay from the Lotus racing trilogy. However, this game becomes more realistic, with a damage diagram on the left side of the screen, slower cars, and the possibility to upgrade the machine. The cars become more difficult to handle and the opponents are faster and tougher than in the previous game. The addition of weather plays a role, forcing the player to change from dry to wet tyres.

The game takes place in 64 tracks spanning 16 countries, each of which contains four races, starting with Australasia (Australia and New Zealand) and ending at the United States. After each country is beaten, the player is given a password, which can be later used to pick the game back up from that position. Because of agreement to naming rights, the Giza Necropolis in Egypt was renamed to Hugh Sitton, a photographer of Corbis Corporation.

Players need to finish in the top ten positions in each race to qualify for the next one. There is a map that shows the course layout, the position of the players, and the position of the car in first place. The player is given 6 "nitro boosts" at the start which dramatically increase the car's speed for a short period of time. On certain courses, there are pickups along the road ranging from a "$" which is $1,000 cash, a "N" which is an extra "nitro boost", and a "S" which is an automatic nitro administered right when picked up and returns each lap. The other pickups can only be collected once per race. Players must take care to avoid too much damage to any area of the armour. If a section of armour is destroyed and the player takes damage in the area that the destroyed section of the armour used to protect, the car will spin out. Racers will be disqualified if they run out of fuel and coast to a stop before finishing the race. Since there are no pits for cars to refuel in unlike the first game, upgrading the gearbox becomes mandatory in order to get the fuel economy needed to survive the longer races in the later portions of the game. Since the Genesis port of this game does not implement a fuel gauge, fuel economy is not a problem in that port.

Players have the option of either an automatic or manual gearshift, and can configure the controls as they please at the opening menu of the game.

Players can spend money earned in a race to upgrade their cars. Upgrading the engine makes the car accelerate faster, helps the top speed of the car by a small amount, and makes it easier for the car to reach higher gears. Upgrading the nitro makes nitro boosts accelerate more strongly and reach higher top speeds. Upgrading the gearbox mainly improves the car's top speed, improves the car's fuel economy, and can greatly improve the car's acceleration starting with the third out of four gearboxes that are available, but gearbox upgrades require an engine that is strong enough to allow shifting into higher gears in order to be effective. Upgrading the armour allows cars to take more damage before the armour is destroyed in the area that is being upgraded. The paint shop allows the color of the car to be changed. Upgrading the tyres improves their grip and the car's turning performance.

== Reception ==
Reception

Review score
Publication	Score
Edge	6/10

Reviewing the Genesis version, GamePro assessed that Top Gear 2 has a good number of tracks and solid controls, but feels outdated compared to contemporary racing games due to the limited options for altering the car's configuration. They concluded that "for simple, straightforward fun, Top Gear 2 still qualifies". Nintendo Power gave the SNES version a score of 3.55 out of 5. Super Gamer gave the SNES version a review score of 83% stating that the game has better graphics and more depth.

IGN ranked the game 95th on their "Top 100 SNES Games of All Time".

== See also ==
- Lotus
