= The Lord of the Rings: War in the North =

2011 action role-playing video game

- Developers: Snowblind Studios; Feral Interactive (OS X); Aspyr (Legacy Edition)
- Publishers: Warner Bros. Interactive Entertainment; Feral Interactive (OS X); Aspyr (Legacy Edition)
- Producers: Josh Fleming; Lucas Ritting; Ruth Tomandl
- Composer: Inon Zur
- Platforms: PlayStation 3; Microsoft Windows; Xbox 360; OS X; Nintendo Switch; Nintendo Switch 2; PlayStation 5; Xbox Series X/S
- Release: NA: November 1, 2011; EU: November 25, 2011; OS X: NA: September 18, 2013; Legacy Edition: WW: August 11, 2026
- Genres: Action role playing, hack and slash
- Modes: Single-player, multiplayer

The Lord of the Rings: War in the North is a 2011 action role-playing game developed by Snowblind Studios and published by Warner Bros. Interactive Entertainment for PlayStation 3, Xbox 360, and Microsoft Windows. An OS X port was developed and published by Feral Interactive in 2013. It is the second video game based on both J. R. R. Tolkien's 1954 high fantasy novel The Lord of the Rings and Peter Jackson's film trilogy adaptation released in 2001 (The Fellowship of the Ring), 2002 (The Two Towers) and 2003 (The Return of the King), following the release of The Lord of the Rings: The Battle for Middle-earth II in 2006. WB Games acquired the rights for both intellectual properties in 2009 - prior to this, Vivendi Universal Games, in partnership with Tolkien Enterprises, had held the rights to make games based on Tolkien's literary works, whilst Electronic Arts held the rights to make games based on the New Line Cinema films.

The game contains narrative elements similar to both the novels and the films, although the aesthetic design is based more specifically upon the look of the latter, with characters in the game bearing the likenesses of their actors in those films. The game does not directly adapt the story depicted in the novel and films, but instead depicts a trio of adventurers whose quest runs parallel to the main narrative, occasionally intersecting with it. The story follows them as they attempt to track down and defeat a powerful Black Númenórean named Agandaûr, whom Sauron has employed to lay waste to the northern regions of Middle-earth, whilst Sauron himself concentrates on Rohan and Gondor.

The game received mixed reviews, with critics praising the graphics and tone, but criticizing the repetitive combat, weak storyline and poor character development. It was also criticized for containing several game-breaking bugs. War in the North was a commercial failure, which some attributed to the timing of its launch among other high-profile releases. The game was re-released for Nintendo Switch, Nintendo Switch 2, PlayStation 5, Windows and Xbox Series X/S in August 2026.

== Gameplay ==
War in the North is an action role-playing hack and slash game played from a third-person perspective. The game features three playable characters; Eradan (a Ranger), Farin (a Dwarf) and Andriel (an Elf). When the player begins any level they must choose one of the three to control. However, they can switch at the end of each level, or by loading a previously saved game and selecting a different character. Each character has its own weaponry and abilities. Eradan uses the following combinations of arms: bow, a two-handed sword, a sword and shield or two single-handed weapons. His skill set is built around stealth. His abilities allow him to follow the tracks of other Rangers to secret stashes of items and weapons. Farin uses two-handed heavy weapons such as axes, a single-handed weapon and a shield, or a crossbow. His skills are built around melee combat. He has the ability to detect fissures and weakness in walls and rocks, smashing them open to find money, items and gems. Andriel uses a staff and a shield, or a staff and a single-handed weapon. Her staff also serves as her long-range weapon. Her skills are built around offensive and defensive spell casting. She can also create potions from alchemy ingredients collected in the field, and her special ability allows her to find secret passages marked with hidden elven glyphs.

Farin kills a Goblin in Fornost. His health, magic and character level are at the bottom left.

All characters have a light and a heavy attack, and all three can roll, block and sprint. Players can also perform critical strikes; when a yellow indicator appears over the head of an enemy a heavy attack will produce a critical strike, which are extra-strong attacks that often kills the enemy with a single hit. During a single-player game, players may issue orders to their AI companions; ordering them to either seek out enemies and attack, or stay near the player character and defend. Players may also revive fallen allies; if the player character dies, the player must wait to be revived by an AI ally. Another aspect of combat is the player's ability to summon a Great Eagle to aid them. The eagle can target a single foe for a large amount of damage. However, the player is limited in the number of times they can summon him, and he can be summoned only when the player is in an outdoors location.

The game also features online co-op gameplay for up to three players, each controlling one character. When playing in co-op mode, players can swap items between one another, and each player can find secrets unique to his or her character, meaning all of a level's secrets can be found in a single play-through, which they can not in single-player mode. Also in multiplayer, when all three player controlled characters are fighting a strong enemy, they can build up a combo chain. When the chain is sufficiently long, the players enter "Hero Mode," which results in much stronger attacks. To build up the combo chain, the player must continuously land successful attacks without being hit. Single-player games also include a hero mode, although it is limited to the player character; the AI allies do not enter hero mode.

Characters gain experience by defeating enemies and completing quests. A character will level up when enough experience points have been gained. Once a character has leveled up, they get three points to spend on their stats (strength, will, stamina and dexterity), and one skill point to use in their skill tree. Players' skills are attached to their melee weapon, their long range weapon and their defensive stance; i.e. some skills are only available during melee combat, some during long-range combat and some when the player is blocking.

The game features two unlockable difficulty modes. When the player first plays the game, they can play on either "easy" or "normal." Once normal has been defeated, "Heroic" mode is unlocked. If this mode is defeated, "Legendary" mode becomes available. Playing through harder difficulties takes the form of a New Game Plus; the characters keep equipment, money, updated stats and unlocked skills from all previous playthroughs.

== Synopsis ==
=== Background ===
The game is presented against the background of the history of the One Ring. At the dawn of the Second Age, after the defeat of the Dark Lord, Morgoth, the elves of Eregion forged the nineteen Rings of Power to help themselves, the dwarves and men rule Middle-earth. However, the elves were unaware that Sauron, Morgoth's closest ally, had survived his master's defeat, and in the guise of Annatar had been the one who taught the Elven-smiths, led by Celebrimbor, how to forge the Rings, whilst, in secret, he forged his own One Ring in the fires of Mount Doom, a Ring far more powerful than any of the others. However, in order for the One Ring to be powerful enough to control the other Rings, Sauron had to transfer most of his power into it. As soon as he put it on, the elves became aware of his ruse, removing and hiding their Three Rings, which Celebrimbor had forged without Sauron's aid. Sauron waged war on the elves, conquering much of Middle-earth and killing Celebrimbor. Thus began the Dark Years, when Sauron took possession of the remaining sixteen Rings, giving seven to the dwarves and nine to men in an effort to corrupt them. The dwarves proved relatively immune to the powers of the Rings, acquiring only a greed for gold, and becoming unconcerned with events in the wider world. Men proved less resilient, and the nine kings given the Rings become the nine Ring-wraiths, or Nazgûl, led by the Witch-king of Angmar.

In his ongoing efforts to conquer Middle-earth, Sauron regained the allegiance of many of Morgoth's servants from the First Age, and successfully corrupted Númenor. However, in doing so, he expended a great deal of his power, and permanently lost the ability to assume a pleasing disguise. Returning to Mordor, he regained his strength, eventually capturing Minas Ithil. Realizing that if they did not join together, Sauron would destroy both men and elves, Elendil, High King of Arnor, and Gil-galad, High King of Noldor, formed the Last Alliance of Men and Elves, and attacked Sauron in his fortress, Barad-dûr. The alliance was victorious, with Isildur cutting the One Ring from Sauron's hand. Although Isildur had a chance to destroy the One Ring, he began to succumb to its corrupting power and refused to destroy it. Thus, Sauron's spirit survived, bound to the Ring. Some time later, Isildur was attacked and killed by a band of orcs, and the Ring was lost in the river Anduin for over two thousand years.

During the Third Age, a weakened Sauron covertly established a stronghold at Dol Guldur. In response to this undetermined evil, the Valar sent five Maiar to Middle-earth. Taking the form of wizards, they were led by Saruman. Unsure of the origin of the evil power in Dol Guldur, the wizard Gandalf was sent to investigate. However, Sauron hid from Gandalf, waiting for four hundred years before returning. Around the same time, the One Ring was found by a Hobbit named Sméagol, who became utterly corrupted by it, living in the caves of the Misty Mountains, and physically transforming into a creature known as Gollum. For five hundred years, Gollum was consumed and corrupted by the Ring. Eventually, Gandalf was able to determine the evil presence in Dol Guldur was indeed Sauron. Gandalf reported back to the White Council, but Saruman dissuaded them from moving against Sauron. Only when he learned the One Ring may be in the vicinity of the Gladden Fields did Saruman agree to attack Sauron, hoping to find the Ring himself. The Council drove Sauron from Dol Guldur, unaware that he knew the Ring had been found. Just prior to Sauron's departure, the Ring passed to another hobbit, Bilbo Baggins, who used it to assist in the victory of elves, men and dwarves at the Battle of the Five Armies. Sixty years later, Gollum was captured by orcs, and taken to Mordor, where he was tortured into revealing the owner and location of the Ring; Bilbo Baggins of the Shire. In the meantime, Bilbo had left the Shire to live in Rivendell, and upon the advice of Gandalf had (very reluctantly) given the Ring to his nephew, Frodo Baggins. With the information given him by Gollum, Sauron, still unable to take physical form, thus sent the Nazgûl to the Shire to retrieve the One Ring. Frodo, and his friends, Samwise Gamgee, Peregrin "Pippin" Took and Meriadoc "Merry" Brandybuck managed to escape the Shire and head towards Bree.

=== Plot ===
"Of the great War of the Ring many songs have been sung and many tales told. The names of heroes like Gandalf the Grey, Aragorn the King and Frodo the Ring-bearer are greatly revered. And rightly so. Yet Sauron's grasp stretched much further than the lands of Gondor and Rohan alone, and his forces might have done great evil in the North of Middle-earth had a handful of heroes not stood in his path. Their stories too, deserve to be told. Pay heed now to one such tale, which begins in the town of Bree, just a few short days before Frodo arrived on his quest."

— opening narration

The game begins with Eradan (voiced by Nolan North), Andriel (Laura Bailey) and Farin (Fred Tatasciore) arriving at the Prancing Pony in Bree, where they meet Aragorn (Chris Edgerly), informing him that three days previously the Dúnedain guard at Sarn Ford was attacked by the Nazgûl, who passed into the Shire. After the raid, the Witch-king of Angmar (Eric Lopez), met with a Black Númenórean named Agandaûr (Fred Tatasciore), who told the Witch-king his orcs are forming an army in the ruins of Fornost, as per Sauron's command. Aragorn explains that a Hobbit with a "great burden" is on his way to Bree, and if the enemy take the object from him, it will mean certain doom for the Free peoples of Middle-earth. As such, he asks the trio to distract the orcs at Fornost.

In Fornost, the trio rescue a Great Eagle imprisoned by orcs. Revealing his name is Beleram (John Patrick Lowrie), an eagle from the Misty Mountains in the service of Gwaihir, they tell him of Agandaûr, and he offers to help. They then encounter Elladan and Elrohir (Liam O'Brien), the sons of Elrond, who they also tell of Agandaûr and their mission to distract him. The twins, however, suggest they may be able to destroy Agandaûr. In the citadel at the center of the ruins, the group fight their way to the top, where they face Agandaûr, who leaps from the roof onto a waiting Fell-beast. Unable to predict Agandaûr's next move, each of the group elects to return to their respective superiors; Beleram to Gwaihir in the Misty Mountains, Elladan and Elrohir to Elrond in Rivendell, and the trio to their captain, Halbarad, at Sarn Ford.

Halbarad (Peter Jessop) tells them Aragorn left Bree in the company of four hobbits, heading towards Rivendell, and he advises them to follow. After passing through the Barrow-downs, they reach Rivendell, where they are welcomed by Elrond (Jim Piddock), Gandalf (Tom Kane) and Aragorn, who explain the Hobbit Frodo Baggins (Yuri Lowenthal), is in possession of the One Ring, which must be destroyed by casting it into fires of Mount Doom. A fellowship of nine has thus been formed to carry the Ring to its destruction. The trio ask how they may help, and Gandalf explains the immediate concern is Agandaûr, as his mission and location are unknown. Elrond speculates he may be planning an attack on Rivendell, and, as such, it is likely he has gone to the Ettenmoors to strengthen his army with trolls.

The trio head to investigate the Ettenmoors, where they again encounter Beleram, who tells them the orcs and trolls in the region have formed an army under a Stone-giant named Bargrisar, who is waging war on the Eagles, and as such, several Eagles have come to the Ettenmoors to kill him. The trio agree to help, eventually finding and weakening Bargrisar, allowing Beleram to kill him. They are then joined by Gwaihir (Ike Amadi) and two other eagles, Baranthor (Liam O'Brien) and Armenel (Brandon Murray). Gwaihir speculates Bargrisar must have been operating under the command of someone else. The trio return to Rivendell with Beleram, Baranthor and Armenel, where Elrond says the Fellowship have safely departed. He has also found evidence of Mount Gundabad orcs operating in the Ettenmoors.

The eagles drop the trio near Gundabad, and as they climb, they see a massive army of orcs gathering in the valley. Once inside the fortress, they find the bodies of many dwarfs, with a dying dwarf telling them a group of dwarves came to Gundabad to activate a secret weapon with which to destroy the orc army. He tells them that Nordri has the key with which to operate the weapon, and is still alive within the chambers. The trio locate Nordri (Nolan North), who, along with Bruni (Jim Meskimen) is attempting to activate the weapon. The trio assist them, and once the weapon is activated, a horn sounds, the reverberations of which cause the fortress to start collapsing. The dwarves explain the weapon's function is to destroy the entire fortress. However, the Eagles then fly into the chamber, rescuing the trio and the two dwarves, and taking them to the dwarves' home, Nordinbad, a secret mountain stronghold on the edge of Rhovanion. Nordri introduces the trio to his father, Gorin (Ike Amadi), Lord of Nordinbad, who tell them he fears Agandaûr may be attempting to ally himself with Úrgost, a Dragon who lives nearby. The trio volunteer to approach Úrgost and find out.

They learn that Úrgost (Keith Szarabajka) has been approached by Agandaûr, who offered him Nordinbad in return for assisting in the destruction of the North. However, Agandaûr does not yet possess Nordinbad, and Úrgost will not join him until he does. In any case, Úrgost has no real interest in Nordinbad. Instead he wants Carn Dûm, a fortress in Angmar, which is currently occupied by Agandaûr. Úrgost does not wish to make an enemy of Sauron by taking the fortress from Sauron's ally. He proposes the trio take the fortress instead and turn it over to him. In return, he will remain neutral in the war. He also tells them if they wish to save Nordinbad, they should hurry, as it is under siege as they speak.

They head back to find Bruni has been killed, with Nordri coordinating the defenses. The eagles attack the siege towers, whilst the trio help defend the courtyard. Nordinbad is successfully defended, although Baranthor and Armenel are killed, and Beleram is seriously wounded. The dwarves take Beleram inside to tend to his injuries as the trio head to Carn Dûm to face Agandaûr. They fight their way towards the summit, but are attacked by a fell-beast. Suddenly, Beleram appears, killing the beast. Still injured, he tells them he will be there for them should they need him in the fight against Agandaûr. They confront Agandaûr and as they fight, Beleram attacks, lifting Agandaûr into the air. However, Agandaûr is able to stab and kill him. The distraction, however, allows the trio to strike, killing Agandaûr. As he dies, he calls on Sauron for aid. However, nothing happens. Úrgost then arrives, telling the trio that Sauron has been defeated and the Ring destroyed. He takes possession of Carn Dûm as the trio begin the journey back to Rivendell.

In an alternative ending, in which the player does not call on Beleram for support during the fight with Agandaûr, Beleram survives and joins them on the journey home.

== Development ==
"Snowblind has been making action RPGs for a very long time, and this is the culmination of everything we're been leading to. This is the game that Lord of the Rings fans have been waiting for."

— Larry Paolicelli; executive producer.

The game was first announced on March 18, 2010 when Warner Bros. Interactive Entertainment revealed Snowblind Studios were developing the game for PlayStation 3, Xbox 360 and Windows. In March 2009, Warner had acquired the rights to make games based on the film series from Electronic Arts, and in May 2009 they had acquired the rights to make games based on the literary series from Vivendi Games. With Warner holding the rights to both intellectual properties, it meant New Line Cinema and Middle-earth Enterprises were both involved in the game. War in the North was the second Warner Lord of the Rings game, after Aragorn's Quest, but the first for which they possessed the rights for both the films and the books (Aragorn's Quest was based exclusively on the films).

In their earliest press release for the game, Warner said War in the North would feature "unseen lands, story elements, and characters from Middle-earth, as well as elements familiar from past feature films." Producer Ruth Tomandl explained,

Having both the rights to the films and the books has definitely allowed us to take the approach we want. We're not restricted to just what was shown in the films and can work with the entire background of the world as revealed in the books. We really wanted to use the opportunity to go to new areas of Middle-earth that players haven't seen before and to tell a new story. Everything in our story is based directly on the books, which have tons of detail and history to draw from, and we're very careful that all of our work fits within the lore.

At the E3 event in 2011, she reiterated,

We were able to draw from the books and films to create a story that ties into the story that people know while still being really new. So we have a lot of new characters and locations, but they all thread into the War of the Ring, and all the Lord of the Rings stuff that people know. You're meeting characters that you're familiar with as well as brand new characters and some characters from the books that you might know of that weren't in the films, so we really get the best of all possible worlds. We're in Middle-earth, which is the best fantasy world, drawing from all the sources and creating something really new that players are going to be excited about.

More specifically, War in the North was inspired by Gandalf's comment in The Return of the King that the efforts in the east of Middle-earth during the War of the Ring would have been futile if not for the contributions of "a few heroes in the North." Tomandl explains,

At the end of The Return of the King, Gandalf mentions a great battle that took place in Erebor, and says that if the Dwarves and Men there hadn't won that battle, the war could have been lost even if the One Ring had been destroyed. Frodo's quest was extremely important, but everyone in Middle-earth was drawn into the War of the Ring. Even Lothlórien, which was remote and well-protected, was attacked during the war. The fact that the whole world was at war is what we're drawing on for War in the North. Tolkien's work mentions Dwarves living in the Grey Mountains, and that the Orcs had a capital city at Mt. Gundabad, and that the Witch-king of Angmar had once ruled a large part of the North, so we're using that canon as the foundation of our story. (Note: The passage to which Tomandl refers is from "Appendix A, Part III: Durin's Folk" at the end of Return of the King. The exact quote is "With his far-stretched right hand, Sauron might have done great evil in the North, if King Dáin and King Brand had not stood in his path [...] When you think of the great Battle of the Pelennor, do not forget the battles in Dale and the valour of Durin's folk. Think of what might have been. Dragon-fire and savage swords in Eriador, night in Rivendell. There might be no Queen in Gondor. We might now hope to return from the victory here only to ruin and ash. But that has been averted.")

"You could point to the game's locations on a map of Middle-earth; in fact, we're using the same map that was used in the film as the basis for our world map. Everything in War in the North that wasn't in the films is based on information from the books; we've been careful to stay as close to the canon as we can. Our writer is a Lord of the Rings expert and a huge J.R.R. Tolkien fan, and he makes sure that everything we do works within the framework of the books. We also work closely with the license holders to make sure we're accurate to the lore."

— Ruth Tomandl; producer.

One of the ways in which the involvement of Middle-earth Enterprises manifested itself was in how conversations are handled in the game. When the player speaks to an NPC, the game uses a system similar to Mass Effect, with the player given several response options from which to choose each time the NPC says something. However, whereas in Mass Effect, there was a moral dimension in choosing a given response, that would affect the development of the character, there is no such aspect in War in the North. Players can choose dialogue that will simply move the story forward, or dialogue that will fill in background information and expand the lore behind the game. Snowblind had initially planned to give players the option to choose rude responses and thus develop their character in different moral directions. However, Middle-earth Enterprises were against this, arguing that in Tolkien, the heroes are always decent, kind people. As such, the developers abandoned the idea. According to Tomandl, "we've been working with the license holders to ensure that this really respects the franchise in a way they want it to, and one of the things they told us is that they want our heroes to be good guys."

The game was conceived as primarily a co-op from its inception, with the developers feeling that co-operation amongst traditionally antagonistic races is such a major theme in the novels, they wanted to replicate it in the game. Having experimented with two, three and four-player co-op, they ultimately decided to go with three-player, thus mirroring the classic triptych in the novels; Man (Aragorn), Elf (Legolas) and Dwarf (Gimli). Lead designer Andre Maguire explained that how players experienced co-op mode was equally as important as them simply playing it;

The tendency is to be competitive with your allies, but we really wanted to team to feel like they were constantly working together, so incentivizing that through the XP system, and making sure that as you're upgrading your character, it's complimentary [sic] with what's going on with the other characters. That took a lot of time to get right, and we were iterating it on it right up to the end.

However, according to Tomandl, the focus on co-op gameplay did not mean single-player mode was neglected;

Snowblind Studios has a long history of great co-op action RPGs, and The Lord of the Rings is the perfect match for that kind of game. We want to make a game that's fun to play with your friends on the couch, so you can experience more of Middle-earth together. The co-op is a blast, and the AI allies that take over in single-player are pretty smart, so all the work we're doing to make the co-op great will directly translate to single-player as well. The story of The Lord of the Rings really emphasizes how important it is to have allies you can trust, work with, and rely on, especially during wartime. So working as part of your own fellowship helps tie the gameplay back into the overall narrative.

War in the North is the first Lord of the Rings game to be rated M (17+) in North America, PEGI 18 in Europe, and BBFC 15 in the UK. Snowblind Studios founder Ryan Geithman stated that having the game M-rated allowed the developers to depict a grittier and more violent Middle-earth than had ever before been seen in a video game, whilst remaining authentic to both the films and Tolkien's original work.

The game was first shown at E3 in June 2010, with a demo of the Mirkwood levels available. At this time, the three playable characters were a dwarven melee fighter, an elven archer and a wizard. The next demo was made available at Gamescom in August, with part of the Ettenmoors levels. The game was next shown at the Game Developers Conference in March 2011, where it was revealed gameplay options would include single-player mode, two-player local split-screen with one online player or one AI controlled player, two to three player LAN, and two to three player online multiplayer via PlayStation Network, Xbox Live or Steam. The game was next shown at E3 in June 2011, when Beleram was revealed for the first time, a demo was shown of the Fornost level and character skills were demonstrated in detail. On August 2, WB Games announced the game would be released in North America on November 1 for all platforms.

=== Collector's Edition ===
On July 5, 2011, WB Games announced a Collector's Edition of the game would be released alongside the regular edition, as well as a number of store-specific pre-order special offers. The Collector's Edition comes in a Ranger quiver case and includes a concept art-book, and a "behind-the-score" DVD featuring interviews with Inon Zur and footage of the score being recorded at Abbey Road Studios, as well as a concert event from E3 2011, plus three complete tracks. Digital content for the PlayStation 3 version includes War in the North wallpaper, fonts and icons, and for Xbox 360 a Ranger avatar for Xbox Live. Pre-order deals included; for Amazon.com, early access to the War in the North digital comic written by Brian Wood and illustrated by Simon Coleby; for Best Buy, an "Elf Theme Pack," giving the player access to rare Elven equipment and unlocking the Lothlórien challenge mission immediately; for GameStop, a "Human Theme Pack," giving the player access to rare Ranger equipment and unlocking the Osgiliath challenge mission; for Target, online access to three tracks from the soundtrack; for Toys "R" Us, a limited edition War in the North poster signed by Jim Lee, and early access to the War in the North digital comic; and for Walmart, a "Dwarf Theme Pack," giving the player access to rare Dwarven equipment.

== Reception ==
Reception

Aggregate score
| Aggregator | Score | | |
| Aggregator | PC | PS3 | Xbox 360 |
|---|---|---|---|
| Metacritic | 66/100 | 63/100 | 61/100 |

Review scores
| Publication | Score | | |
| Publication | PC | PS3 | Xbox 360 |
|---|---|---|---|
| Eurogamer | | | 4/10 |
| Game Informer | | 5.5/10 | |
| GameRevolution | B− | B− | B− |
| GameSpot | | 6/10 | 6/10 |
| GameSpy | 3/5 | | |
| IGN | 7/10 | 7/10 | 7/10 |
| PlayStation Official Magazine – UK | | 4/10 | |
| Official U.S. PlayStation Magazine | | 7/10 | |
| Official Xbox Magazine (US) | | | 7.5/10 |
| PC Gamer (UK) | 51% | | |

The Lord of the Rings: War in the North received "mixed or average reviews" across all systems; the PC version holds an aggregate score of 66 out of 100 on Metacritic, based on 25 reviews; the PlayStation 3 version 63 out of 100, based on 35 reviews; the Xbox 360 version 61 out of 100, based on 38 reviews.

Official Xbox Magazine's Cameron Lewis scored the game 7.5 out of 10. Although he was critical of the lack of differentiation between the three protagonists, the shallow pool of enemies and the linear nature of the gameplay, he concluded "War in the North is hardly the most memorable adventure through Middle-earth, but you won't regret any of the time you spend fighting across its grim battlegrounds."

IGN's Steven Hopper scored the game 7 out of 10, writing "there's something too safe in War in the North. The gameplay doesn't take any real risks, as the combat is fairly simple, the RPG features are par for the course, and the story doesn't make any attempt to stand out in the backdrop of its established universe." He was critical of the bland characters and the "inconsequential conversation system," and concluded "while it's admirable that the team had opted to create an original story set alongside the events in the books, you'll wish that they had attempted to take more risks with the project. The characters are bland and lifeless, and the combat, while fun at first, gets pretty repetitive before too long." In November 2011, IGN rated the game the fourth most disappointing release of 2011.

Game Revolution's Josh Laddin scored it a B−. He too criticized the bland characterization. Of the combat system he wrote "there isn't anything especially innovative about it, but it's all solid." He was also heavily critical of game-breaking bugs. He concluded "War in the North is a good choice for some classic action-RPG fun. It isn't amazing, but it's a competent effort and certainly one of the better LotR games to come along.

GameSpot's Carolyn Petit scored both the PlayStation 3 and Xbox 360 versions 6 out of 10. Although she praised the graphics, she was critical of the collision detection, the autosave feature, enemy AI and technical issues with multiplayer. She concluded "there are times when War in the North shows you the game it could have been [...] But each time the game starts to hit its stride, it soon stumbles and falls on its face."

GameSpy's Leif Johnson scored the PC version 3 out of 5 arguing "it never overcomes a sense of enjoyable mediocrity." He felt the game was unlikely to be a success due to the timing of its release; amidst such highly anticipated title as Dark Souls, Battlefield 3, Modern Warfare 3, Batman: Arkham City, Uncharted 3 and Skyrim. He concluded "Unless you're a Tolkien die-hard, you'll probably be better off waiting a week for the next fantasy-based game featuring a struggle in the snow-riddled northern reaches of the world [...] At its core, War in the North isn't a bad game; it's merely a disappointing one."

Game Informer's Joe Juba scored the PlayStation 3 version 5.5 out of 10, calling it "clumsy and unpolished." He too complained about game breaking bugs, and concluded "I can only say one good thing about War in the North: It could have been awesome. The conceptual framework is solid, and with some extensive tuning and polish, it would be fun to play."

Eurogamer's Jeffrey Matulef scored the Xbox 360 version 4 out of 10. He called the narrative "merely a catalyst for a linear dungeon crawler." As with several reviewers, he also found the game suffered from bugs, calling it "a glitchy mess." He concluded, "The Lord of the Rings: War in the North is a soulless cash-in that has little to do with its license, and nor is it much fun in its own right. If you're lucky enough to not encounter any game-breaking bugs and if you have a friend or two to play with, then it can be pretty entertaining for a few hours. But that's a lot of "ifs" for so little payoff."

PlayStation Official Magazine - UK's Joel Gregory also scored it 4 out of 10. He too found the timing of the release poor, believing it would not find an audience. He criticized the lack of differentiation between the characters, poor character development, repetitive combat, and "half-arsed" skill-trees. Of the story, he wrote "it basically goes like this: 'remember all the stuff from those films and books you love so much? Here's some other really crucial stuff that happened at the same time...only it wasn't important enough for anyone to mention during those 1,500 pages'."

=== Sales ===
The game was a commercial failure, selling just over three-quarters of a million units worldwide at its launch across all platforms. In the UK, it charted at #38 in its opening week.
