= The Sword of Hope II =

1992 video game

Selection II: Ankoku no Fuuin The Sword of Hope II
- Front of the Japanese box artwork
- Developer: Kemco
- Publisher: Kemco
- Platforms: Game Boy, 3DS Virtual Console
- Release: Game Boy: JP: September 4, 1992; NA: September 1996; Selection I & II: JP: May 1, 1998
- Genre: Role-playing video game
- Mode: Single-player

The Sword of Hope II, known in Japan as Selection II: Ankoku no Fuuin (セレクションII 暗黒の封印), is a 1992 role-playing video game developed and published by Kemco for the Game Boy. It is the sequel to the 1989 The Sword of Hope. A "dungeon crawler"-type game, the player must retrieve the Sword of Hope, which has been stolen, and find the evil Zakdos who has been set free after being imprisoned.

In 1998, both Sword of Hope games were rereleased in Japan as a single Game Boy cartridge, Selection I & II. The Sword of Hope II was released for the 3DS Virtual Console in 2012, and the Nintendo Classics service in 2026.

== Reception ==
The four reviewers of Electronic Gaming Monthly were mostly dissatisfied by the game, with their main complaint being that the battles are much too slow and time-consuming, making combat and travel a chore rather than a pleasure. Crispin Boyer and Sushi-X, however, found that it was still a decent enough game for those who liked the first game in the series or simply wanted a portable RPG. They scored it a 5.25 out of 10. GamePro gave it a negative review, citing the generic, slow, overly frequent, and repetitive battles.
