= Mystic Chronicles =

2012 video game

- Artwork for the English-language PSP/PS Vita release
- Developer: Kemco
- Publisher: Natsume Inc.
- Platforms: PlayStation Portable, iOS
- Release: PSP: JP: September 4, 2012; NA: July 16, 2013; EU: January 29, 2014; PS VITA: NA: August 6, 2013; iOS: NA: January 19, 2012; PlayStation 4'PlayStation 5'Xbox Series X and Series S''''Nintendo Switch''''Windows https://www.kemco-games.com/global/pr/gech_pre_xbox_st_sw.html
- Genre: Role-playing video game
- Mode: Single player

Mystic Chronicles is a Japanese role-playing video game developed by Kemco. While initially released as Fantasy Chronicles for the iOS, the name was retitled as a result of Natsume Inc. providing a new English translation for its release on the PlayStation Portable, released in North America on July 16, 2013. It was re-released on Xbox Series X and Series S, Xbox One and Windows devices, Steam, PlayStation 5 / PlayStation 4 (supporting Cross-Buy) and for the Nintendo Switch as Genso Chronicles.

== Gameplay ==
The game plays as a traditional Japanese role-playing video game. In the game, the player navigates a character through a fantasy world, interacting with non-playable characters and fighting enemies. When engaging enemies, the game utilizes a turn based battle system reminiscent of ones found in the Dragon Quest series of games.

== Story ==
The game stars a boy named Lux, who wishes to protect the village he grew up in, from external threats.

== Development ==
Developer Kemco, while a prevalent maker of video games during the NES era of video games, eventually ceased releasing video games in North America as technology and graphics advanced. In the 2010s, however, they changed their focus to release smaller, retro based games for mobile phones.

The game was originally released as Fantasy Chronicles for iOS. The game was eventually ported to the PlayStation Portable. In February 2013, Natsume Inc. announced they would be releasing the game under a new title, Mystic Chronicles, with a new translation, distancing it from its original release, which was criticized for its translation. The PSP release will also contain an additional storyline.

The game is updated to be compatible with the PlayStation Vita on August 6, 2013.

== Reception ==
Touch Arcade gave the game a 3.5 out of 5 rating, praising the classic gameplay features such as the battle system and crafting, but criticizing the game for being tedious after extended play time, and for its poor English translation, something Natsume Inc. would later address with its complete re-translation with its PSP release.
