= Boulder Dash EX =

2002 video game

- Developer: Vision Works
- Publisher: Kemco
- Platform: Game Boy Advance
- Release: NA: September 17, 2002; EU: April 10, 2003
- Genre: Action-puzzle
- Modes: Single-player, multiplayer

Boulder Dash EX is an action-puzzle video game developed by Tokyo-based Vision Works and published by Kemco for the Game Boy Advance in September 2002. It is part of the Boulder Dash series and a remake of the arcade version of Boulder Dash.

== Gameplay ==
The objective of the game is to burrow through tunnels collecting gems without causing rocks and other things to crush the player character. Over 60 puzzles are included in the game. Three modes are featured in the game: "EX Game" mode is an updated version of the game, with new enemies, items, and anime-style cutscenes between levels featuring the player character, Alex, embarking on a quest to rescue his friend Sonya from the Dark King. The "Classic Game" mode features the entire original arcade game, and the multiplayer "Battle Mode" allows up to four players to compete simultaneously using a link cable.

== Reception ==
Reception

Aggregate score
Aggregator	Score
Metacritic	79/100

Review scores
Publication	Score
GameSpy	78/100
IGN	7.5/10
Jeuxvideo.com	14/20
Nintendo Power	22/25

Boulder Dash EX received "generally positive" reviews according to review aggregator Metacritic.

Nintendo Power said the game is "a very replayable and addictive challenge". GameSpy summarized: "[...] if you enjoy the genre you can't really go wrong with Boulder Dash EX". IGN said: "The story and cutscenes are a little on the tacky side, and the graphics might not be the most elaborate seen on the GBA, but Boulder Dash EX is quite a fun, little surprise". Jeuxvideo.com called it an "excellent game".
