= RPGolf Legends =

2022 video game

- Developer: ArticNet
- Publisher: Kemco
- Platforms: Microsoft Windows; Nintendo Switch; PlayStation 4; PlayStation 5; Xbox One; Xbox Series X and Series S
- Release: January 20, 2022
- Genres: Role-playing, Golf
- Mode: Single-player

RPGolf Legends is a 2022 role-playing video game video game developed by ArticNet and published by Kemco.

== Gameplay ==
The game combines RPG and golf simulation game elements. Players aim golf shots by selecting power and accuracy per shot. Non-player characters give the player various quests. The game also incorporates crafting elements.

== Development ==
The game was developed by the studio ArticNet and published by Kemco. This game was developed as a follow-up to the 2017 mobile game RPGolf. The game was developed for personal computers and contemporary major video game consoles.

Details about the game were announced at the 2021 Tokyo Game Show. The game was released on January 20, 2022.

== Reception ==
Reception

Aggregate score
Aggregator	Score
Metacritic	NS: 68/100

Review scores
Publication	Score
Famitsu	28/40
Nintendo World Report	NS: 8/10
Push Square	PS5: 6/10
RPGamer	2.5/5
RPGFan	NS: 79/100
Siliconera	6/10

RPGolf Legends received mixed or average reviews for the Nintendo Switch version according to the review aggregator Metacritic.

A number of reviewers compared and contrasted the game to Golf Story or entries in the Mario Golf series.

Rock Paper Shotgun found the concept of the game appealing, while criticizing parts of the execution, such as a game design which led to excess grinding. Nintendo World Report had more positive sentiment, but also noted that the game featured significant grinding. RPGamer and Siliconera criticized the lack of elevation as a mechanic on the golf courses. However RPGamer did find some positive sentiment in the golf cart mechanic. In their review, RPGfan notes the story was not well developed, but did find that the game was good for a short and casual playthrough.
