= Champions: Return to Arms =

2005 video game

- Developer: Snowblind Studios
- Publishers: NA: Sony Online Entertainment; EU: Ubisoft
- Designer: Paul Knutzen
- Composer: Inon Zur
- Platform: PlayStation 2
- Release: NA: February 7, 2005; EU: March 18, 2005
- Genres: Action role-playing, hack and slash
- Modes: Single-player, multiplayer

Champions: Return to Arms is a 2005 action role-playing video game developed by Snowblind Studios and published by Sony Online Entertainment for the PlayStation 2 Set in the EverQuest universe, it is the sequel to Champions of Norrath. As with its predecessor, Ubisoft released the game in Europe.

== Plot ==
The story picks up after Innoruuk, the Prince of Hate has been defeated, his essence shattered into the Shards of Hatred and were strewn across the Planes of Power. Within the game story, players have the choice of serving either the forces of Good by destroying the shards to rid the world of Innoruuk, or the legions of Evil gathering the shards to resurrect the fallen god. The paths of Good and Evil travel to the same locations, with variations in mission objectives.

== Gameplay ==
Champions: Return to Arms features multiple character classes, such as wizard, cleric, ranger, and warrior. The game also features an online mode where a player can join up to three other players from around the world. Gameplay consists of killing monsters and completing quests to earn experience, in a traditional hack-and-slash style. When the character attains enough experience, he or she gains a level.

== Reception ==
Reception

Aggregate score
Aggregator	Score
Metacritic	77/100

Review scores
Publication	Score
Edge	6/10
Electronic Gaming Monthly	6.83/10
Game Informer	8/10
GamePro	4.5/5
GameRevolution	C+
GameSpot	7.8/10
GameSpy	3.5/5
GameZone	8/10
IGN	7.6/10
Official U.S. PlayStation Magazine	4.5/5
Detroit Free Press	2/4
The Times	4/5

The game received "favorable" reviews, though not as much as Champions of Norrath, according to video game review aggregator Metacritic.

The Times' reviewer gave the game four stars out of five and said, "The number of times I got ripped apart by wild dogs made me regret ever wanting to be a lizard. Didn't stop me coming back for more, though." Maxim similarly gave it a score of eight out of ten, saying, "Over 100 hours of game play through 50 levels of sword-swinging, spell-casting combat, thousands of new weapons and equipment, and two new characters (the fighting furry Vah Shir and the lizardman Iksar) will keep you huffing at trucker speed through the wee hours." However, Detroit Free Press gave it two stars out of four, saying that "there's hardly anything new here. The plot is paper-thin, and lacks a driving sense of humor or drama to keep you interested. The game-play is just as basic as it's ever been, and frankly, if you've played any of its predecessors, you've slashed and spellcast just this way a million times before."
