= Egg Mania: Eggstreme Madness =

2002 video game

- Developer: HotGen
- Publisher: Kemco
- Composer: Allister Brimble
- Platforms: PlayStation 2, Xbox, GameCube, Game Boy Advance
- Release: September 11, 2002: GameCube; NA: September 11, 2002; JP: September 27, 2002; PAL: October 25, 2002 Xbox; NA: September 11, 2002; JP: October 3, 2002; PAL: October 25, 2002 PlayStation 2; JP: September 12, 2002; NA: September 12, 2002; PAL: October 25, 2002 Game Boy Advance; NA: September 16, 2002; JP: September 27, 2002; PAL: November 22, 2002
- Genre: Puzzle
- Modes: Single-player, multiplayer

Egg Mania: Eggstreme Madness, also known as Eggo Mania in PAL territories, is a puzzle video game released in 2002 by HotGen. It was released for PlayStation 2, Xbox, GameCube, and Game Boy Advance.

== Gameplay ==
At the start of a level, crates begin falling from the sky. Each one has a picture of the block it contains on it. The players have to stack these blocks and build a tower up to the hot-air-balloon to finish the level, but it is not that simple: the water at the bottom of the level rises and if the water reaches a row with a hole in it, the row will be destroyed; if the player decides to take a shortcut, the water will rise faster. Also, several enemies randomly appear, some stealing crates, and some dragging the player into the water. There are also items in bubbles that give the player a power-up or help to destroy an opponent's towers.

== Reception ==
Reception

Aggregate scores
Aggregator	Score
GameRankings	(GBA) 73% (PS2) 68.33% (GC) 66.18% (Xbox) 64.77%
Metacritic	(GBA) 75/100 (PS2) 64/100 (GC) 64/100 (Xbox) 58/100

Review scores
Publication	Score
Edge	5/10
Electronic Gaming Monthly	6/10
Game Informer	(GBA) 8/10 (GC) 7.75/10
GamePro	3.5/5
GameRevolution	C+
GameSpot	6.4/10
GameSpy	3/5
GameZone	7.3/10
IGN	(GBA) 7/10 (PS2) 6.3/10; 5.3/10
Nintendo Power	3.6/5
Official U.S. PlayStation Magazine	2.5/5
Official Xbox Magazine (US)	7.8/10

The game was met with positive to mixed reception. GameRankings and Metacritic gave it a score of 73% and 75 out of 100 for the Game Boy Advance version; 68.33% and 64 out of 100 for the PlayStation 2 version; 66.18% and 64 out of 100 for the GameCube version; and 64.77% and 58 out of 100 for the Xbox version.
