= Champions of Norrath =

2004 video game

- Developer: Snowblind Studios
- Publishers: NA: Sony Online Entertainment; EU: Ubisoft
- Designers: Paul Knutzen; Chris Avellone
- Composer: Inon Zur
- Platform: PlayStation 2
- Release: NA: February 10, 2004; EU: June 25, 2004
- Genres: Action role-playing, hack and slash
- Modes: Single-player, multiplayer

Champions of Norrath: Realms of EverQuest is a 2004 action role-playing video game for the PlayStation 2, set in the EverQuest universe. The game is playable with one single player or cooperative for up to four players, but with a Network Adapter, players can take the game online with others and kill others or join to form groups of adventurers. It uses a re-worked and expanded Baldur's Gate: Dark Alliance game engine. A sequel called Champions: Return to Arms was released in 2005.

== Plot ==
Champions of Norrath features a traditional role-playing video game storyline, in which the player acts as a hero who must save the world via a series of quests and battles. Divided into five acts, the game begins with a quest to assist the elves in their war against the orcs, who have formed an alliance with goblins (which is strange to the citizens of Norrath). In later acts, the player must eventually travel to the underworld and beyond thanks to the antics created by the strange orc leader and his contacts. The game takes place in the focal world of the EverQuest universe known as Norrath, prior to the events of the first EverQuest online RPG, which was itself prior to "The Shattering" of the moon Luclin. The game applies many elements of the EverQuest universe. There are three main antagonists in the storyline: Pelys, leader of the orcs, Vanarhost, a vampire in the Underworld who also narrates the entire game and Innoruuk, the God of Hatred.

== Gameplay ==
The gameplay is a traditional hack and slash with several additional elements. During the opening sequence, the player selects a race, appearance, and skills. From there, the game continues to follow classic RPG standards, as the player fights monsters, explores forests, towns, godly domains and dungeons, obtains gold to purchase weapons, and so on. As the player gains experience, he or she will level up and increase character statistics and abilities.

All characters have a series of spells and skills, which can be enhanced via the Ability Tree. The Ability Tree allows the player flexibility in choosing skills, chiefly because points may be invested in several choices at once. These abilities can increase damage, add new spells, etc. These choices are limited by several factors, including the character's level, the skill's prerequisites, and the total number of ability points in the character's reserve. The points cannot be regained once used.

Equipment is often dropped by enemies, though there is a shop to buy items. Sometimes, the items dropped by enemies are much better than anything for sale in the shop. Each item has a weight and each character has a weight limit (which is increased by strength). Together, this allows for a limited amount of equipment to be carried at any given time, but items known as "Gate Scrolls" allow players to warp back to the nearest shop and sell excess inventory. Moreover, the armor and weapons are customizable through rare items, which allows players to fuse a weapon with statistical bonuses, elemental attack, and increased weapon attack speed.

Dungeons in the game cover many forms of terrain. As with most RPGs, many dungeons in Champions of Norrath feature a boss or large group of enemies that must be defeated to advance or obtain a special item. Traps and secret passages are also common in dungeons (for instance, destructible walls). Furthermore, the game offers two advanced bonus dungeon levels upon completion of the game.

It is possible to import and export characters, which allows the player to save or load a character anywhere in the game while keeping the statistics and items of that character. This is important for scenarios which require a transfer of characters, such as online play (now defunct), multiplayer games, and the sequel, Champions: Return to Arms.

Savepoints and portals play a key role in the gameplay. First, savepoints also double as checkpoints, which may be accessed if a character dies. The Portals are activated when the player walks near the Portal. They allow the player to jump to key locations in each region.

Before the servers shutdown on April 2, 2013, players were able import their character(s) for online play, which could be accessed from a save point. This mode of play allowed for players to join parties or quests. Players could join anywhere in the game, despite completion in the one player mode. Up to four players could join in the same game. It was a cooperative type multiplayer game that disabled damage a player can inflict upon a fellow player.

== Characters ==
There are five types of playable characters that can be used throughout the game: Barbarian Warriors, Wood Elf Rangers, High Elf Clerics, Erudite Wizards, and Dark Elf Shadowknights. Each come in male and female varieties, which have no impact on gameplay other than appearance. This choice cannot be changed after the character is made.

== Reception ==
Reception

Aggregate score
| Aggregator | Score |
|---|---|
| Metacritic | 85/100 |

Review scores
| Publication | Score |
|---|---|
| Edge | 7/10 |
| Electronic Gaming Monthly | 8.33/10 |
| Game Informer | 8.75/10 |
| GamePro | 5/5 |
| GameRevolution | B+ |
| GameSpot | 8.5/10 |
| GameSpy | 4/5 |
| GameZone | 8.7/10 |
| IGN | 8.9/10 |
| Official U.S. PlayStation Magazine | 4.5/5 |
| The Times | 5/5 |

Champions of Norrath received "favorable" reviews according to video game review aggregator Metacritic.
