= Top Gear Overdrive =

1998 video game

- North American Nintendo 64 cover art
- Developer: Snowblind Studios
- Publisher: Kemco
- Composer: Grindstone
- Series: Top Gear
- Platform: Nintendo 64
- Release: NA: November 23, 1998; EU: November 25 1998; JP: March 19, 1999; AU: 1999
- Genre: Racing
- Modes: Single-player, multiplayer

Top Gear Overdrive is a racing game released in 1998 for the Nintendo 64 and the sequel to Top Gear Rally. The game has support for high-resolution graphics if used with the Expansion Pak and features music from the band Grindstone.

== Gameplay ==
A gameplay screenshot of Top Gear Overdrive on the Nintendo 64

In the main mode of play, the player races through six seasons, each season containing more races from more tracks, with faster cars competing.

At the beginning of the race the player starts at the back of the grid at the start line. Computer players at the front of the grid often start one-third of the way around the first lap. Players start with three charges of nitrous oxide, which are used to give the player a temporary speed boost.

While racing, the player can pick up two power-ups: nitrous oxide and cash. The nitrous oxide can be used straight away, while the cash is added to the winnings at the end of the race and used for buying upgrades to the player's car.

Shortcuts are available on each track, and often the use of these decide the outcome of the races, particularly in later seasons.

At the end of each race the player is presented with a screen to allow for various upgrades to their car, such as to acceleration and handling. The player is also able to change their car for a better (or worse) vehicle and can buy extra nitrous oxide to use in the next race.

At the end of the season, if the player places fourth or better in all of that season's tracks, they are allowed to progress to the next season.

== Soundtrack ==
The soundtrack in this game was entirely scored by the band Grindstone from Portland, Oregon. They were made the first band in history to feature on an N64 game.

Lamar Stilwell, the bands lead singer at the time, said he came across an advert in The Rocket Magazine which was "looking for a band that sounds like Alice In Chains and Soundgarden". Knowing Grindstone would fit that sound he wrote back describing his love for video games, the band got the gig and were offered $4000 for their soundtrack to be used.

== Reception ==
Reception

Aggregate score
Aggregator	Score
GameRankings	76%

Review scores
Publication	Score
AllGame	3.5/5
Edge	6/10
Electronic Gaming Monthly	7.5/10
Game Informer	7.25/10
GamePro	4/5
GameSpot	7.3/10
Hyper	85%
IGN	8/10
N64 Magazine	79%
Nintendo Power	7.6/10

The game received "favorable" reviews according to the review aggregation website GameRankings.
