= Dough Boy (video game) =

1984 video game

- Famicom cover art
- Developers: Synapse Software; Kemco (Famicom)
- Publishers: NA: Synapse Software; JP: Kemco
- Designer: Ken Coates
- Platforms: Commodore 64, Famicom
- Release: C64: NA: 1984; Famicom: JP: December 11, 1985
- Genre: Action
- Modes: Single-player, Asymmetrical-multiplayer (Famicom only)

Doughboy (ダウ・ボーイ, Dauboi) is a Commodore 64 video game by Ken Coates released in North America in 1984. A port for the Famicom was released in Japan in 1985 with the spelling changed to Dough Boy.

Doughboy is a nickname given to American soldiers during the First World War because they would often rush into battle while wearing white dust on them; this originated in the Mexican–American War of 1848 when they had to march through the deserts of northern Mexico.

== Gameplay ==
During the later missions in the game, getting run over by a tank leads to instantly losing a life.

The player must rescue a POW from a POW camp.

Players can die by being shot, falling into water (by drowning), being blown up by a land mine, and being run over by a tank. Players are in possession of machine gun and can use dynamite as a way to attack the enemies. A strict time limit of 24 hours (five real-time minutes) is used in order to keep the pace of the game relatively brisk. After each round is completed, time is taken off the clock to make things more difficult.

The Famicom version of the game features a Game A, Game B and 2 Play mode. Game A is the basic game, while Game B increases the difficulty by constantly firing missiles at the player. The 2 Play mode has one player controlling the soldier while the other player controls the missiles. The missiles can be used to destroy enemy soldiers; however, they can still harm the other player.
