= Justice League Heroes: The Flash =

2006 video game

- Developer: WayForward Technologies
- Publisher: Warner Bros. Interactive
- Director: Adam Tierney
- Producer: Chris Watson
- Designers: Adam Tierney; David Wright; Robert Koshak; Armando Nieto Soto III; Mark Bozon
- Programmer: David Wright
- Artists: Jason Pearson; Pablo Ruvalcaba
- Writer: Dana Kurtin
- Composer: Shin'en Multimedia
- Platform: Game Boy Advance
- Release: NA: October 17, 2006; EU: Q4 2006
- Genre: Beat 'em up
- Mode: Single player

Justice League Heroes: The Flash is a 2006 beat 'em up video game developed by Wayforward Technologies and published by Warner Bros. Interactive for the Game Boy Advance (GBA). A spinoff of the console video game Justice League Heroes, the game features the Flash, who must work with the Justice League to defeat an alliance of supervillains. The gameplay incorporates the Flash's speed-based powers, including the ability to slow down time.

The game received mixed reviews upon release. Critics highlighted the speed-based mechanics, vibrant visuals, and challenging boss battles, though some found it lacking in depth or lasting appeal, particularly due to a reliance on basic attacks outside of the Flash's powers.

== Gameplay ==
An example of gameplay from Justice League Heroes: The Flash

Justice League Heroes: The Flash is a side-scrolling beat 'em up with an isometric viewpoint. Players control the Flash / Wally West, progressing through 12 levels to fight waves of robots and henchmen, culminating in boss battles against supervillains like Brainiac, Gorilla Grodd, Zoom, and Circe. Basic combat involves a chain of punches and kicks activated by tapping the attack button, with simple button combinations for superhero attacks like a tornado lariat or ground pound. Pressing the A Button allows the Flash to instantly dash to the nearest enemy, delivering a quick attack. The right shoulder button activates a super-speed mode that slows down enemy movements while the Flash maintains normal speed, allowing multiple hits before enemies react. It is used for both combat and puzzle-solving but is limited by a special-move meter, requiring players to conserve energy. Pressing the left shoulder button summons other Justice League heroes (e.g., Superman, Wonder Woman, Martian Manhunter, Black Canary, Green Arrow) for a screen-clearing super attack or crowd control. These are limited by the meter and icon pickups. As players advance, the Flash unlocks new attack moves. Unlockable modes include a boss rush and a racing challenge against Superman.

== Plot ==
The Flash responds to a robot invasion in Keystone City, discovering a global crisis orchestrated by an unknown mastermind. Guided by the Justice League via the Watchtower, he defeats Gorilla Grodd, who reveals an alliance with the robots' controller. The Flash then tackles threats in Gotham City, defeating Killer Frost, who is also linked to the conspiracy. Next, he aids Wonder Woman's island, Themyscira, overcoming the sorceress Circe, who names Brainiac as the mastermind behind the diversions. The Flash then confronts Zoom in a flooded city caused by earthquakes, learning Zoom is also working with Brainiac. Finally, in Metropolis, the Flash rescues Superman from Brainiac's ship, defeats Brainiac, and uncovers his plan to build a device around a stolen meteor. This device frees Darkseid from an extradimensional prison, setting the stage for a larger Justice League battle against Darkseid's threat to Earth.

== Development and release ==
On June 7, 2006, Warner Bros. Interactive revealed the development of two portable games based on the forthcoming console title Justice League Heroes, with projected releases coinciding with the shipment date of the console version. The Nintendo DS version would be a prequel to the console game, while the GBA version, titled Justice League Heroes: The Flash, is a spinoff. Justice League Heroes: The Flash was developed by WayForward Technologies under the direction of Adam Tierney, with Chris Watson serving as producer. David Wright was the lead programmer, and the game was designed by Tierney, David Wright, Robert Koshak, Armando Nieto Soto III, and Mark Bozon. The script was written by Dana Kurtin, and the portrait artwork was created by Jason Pearson and Pablo Ruvalcaba. The audio was created by Shin'en Multimedia. The game was released in North America on October 17, 2006, and in Europe in the fourth quarter of 2006.

== Reception ==
Reception

Aggregate score
Aggregator	Score
Metacritic	72/100

Review scores
Publication	Score
GameSpot	7.9/10
IGN	8/10
Jeuxvideo.com	10/20
Nintendo Power	5.5/10

Justice League Heroes: The Flash received "mixed or average" reviews according to Metacritic. Lucas M. Thomas of IGN called it a fresh take on the genre that perfectly captures the Flash's spirit, leaving other beat 'em ups "in the dust". Frank Provo of GameSpot praised the imaginative use of the Flash's abilities, "top-flight" presentation, and engaging boss fights, making it a compelling GBA title despite minor flaws. Chris Hoffman of Nintendo Power noted the game's repetitive nature and lack of attack variety, though he said the speed powers and boss battles added some appeal. Dinowan of Jeuxvideo.com described it as an average, forgettable beat 'em up with limited gameplay depth, despite the fun dash mechanic.

Critics praised the integration of the Flash's super-speed as a standout feature. Thomas highlighted the dash mechanic as "incredibly simple but incredibly satisfying", saying it "breathes new life" into the genre, though the absence of Batman as a summonable hero was a minor disappointment. Provo praised the imaginative use of the Flash's powers, and noted the variety added by the summoned Justice League members. However, he noted spotty collision detection, which causes occasional missed attacks, and acknowledged the genre's inherent repetition. Hoffman described the speed powers as cool additions but noted they deplete the special-move meter, forcing conservation and reducing their impact. Dinowan found the dash mechanic "quite funny" but considered it anecdotal, with the super-speed mode largely useless. Hoffman and Dinowan noted that the game's limited attack variety and reliance on basic punches and kicks contributed to repetitive gameplay.

The game's visuals were considered a strong point. Thomas praised the well-animated sprites and vibrant environments, noting the isometric viewpoint enhances the sense of space. Provo commended the detailed, colorful backgrounds with animated touches (e.g., scrolling clouds and splashing water) and smooth character animations that reflected the attitude of recent Justice League comic and TV episodes. Dinowan described the graphics as average, neither ugly nor beautiful, with tiny characters that fail to stand out, though he regarded the red trail left by the Flash's dashes as a visual highlight.

The game's levels were said to be visually distinct, and the boss battles were commended as varied and challenging, but the core beat 'em up loop was deemed repetitive. Thomas noted that the game's diverse locations and strategic boss battles keep the proceedings fresh, and that the unlockable modes extend replayability. Provo highlighted the variety in level settings and enemy types, with boss battles being particularly engaging due to their multiple attack patterns and shifting behaviors. He added that the game mitigates repetition by introducing new enemies regularly. Hoffman acknowledged the diverse enemies and "nifty" boss battles but felt the game became repetitive due to limited attack variety, despite the varied levels. Dinowan found the levels repetitive, with enemies that felt similar despite visual differences. He considered the game lacking in depth and indistinguishable from other GBA beat 'em ups.

The audio was generally well-received, with the Flash's voice clips and comic-inspired sound effects adding charm, though the music was deemed unremarkable. Thomas praised the quick voice clips of the Flash's quips, which he felt enhance his likable personality. Provo highlighted the "kitschy dramatic music", "meaty" sound effects, and "goofy" voice samples as an excellent complement to the action, aligning with the property's tone. Dinowan found the voice clips amusing, but called the music average.
