= Top Gear Rally 2 =

1999 video game

- North American box art
- Developer: Saffire
- Publisher: Kemco
- Series: Top Gear
- Platform: Nintendo 64
- Release: NA: December 3, 1999; EU: February 28, 2000
- Genre: Racing
- Modes: Single-player, multiplayer

Top Gear Rally 2 is a racing video game developed by Saffire and released for the Nintendo 64 in 1999. It is a sequel to Top Gear Rally.

== Gameplay ==
Top Gear Rally 2 is a racing game where players drive rally cars through a series of tracks. The game features a random and dynamic weather system.

== Development ==
Unlike the original Top Gear Rally, which was developed by Boss Game Studios, Top Gear Rally 2 was developed by Saffire. The company conceived Top Gear Rally 2 as a more realistic game than its predecessor, with more simulation-like elements such as real-time car damage and weather effects. The physics engine was completely rewritten. All the vehicles in the game are licensed versions of real rally cars such as the Ford Focus and the Renault Alpine. During the final stages of the development cycle, developers had to work between 16 and 18 hours a day to complete the game. The game supports the Nintendo 64 Expansion Pak, which allows the game to be played at a resolution of 480x480 pixels.

== Reception ==
Reception

Aggregate score
Aggregator	Score
GameRankings	73%

Review scores
Publication	Score
AllGame	3.5/5
Electronic Gaming Monthly	4.625/10 (Note: Two critics of Electronic Gaming Monthly gave the game each a score of 5.5/10, one gave it 4/10, and the other gave it 3.5/10.)
Famitsu	24/40
Game Informer	6.75/10
GameFan	(L.B.) 72% 69% (Note: In GameFan's viewpoint of the game, one critic gave it 68, and the other 69.)
GameSpot	7.6/10
Hyper	60%
IGN	8.2/10
N64 Magazine	90%
Next Generation	4/5
Nintendo Power	7.5/10

Top Gear Rally 2 received "average" reviews, according to the review aggregation website GameRankings. GameFan and GameSpot gave it favorable reviews while it was still in development. N64 Magazine considered it the best rally game for the Nintendo 64, but not as rewarding as World Driver Championship. Mike Wolf of NextGen praised the selection of 15 cars to choose from, realistic weather conditions that affect car handling, a paint shop customization, shortcuts to find and exploit, and multiplayer support for four players. In Japan, however, where the game was ported for release on February 3, 2000, Famitsu gave it a score of 24 out of 40.

The Freshman of GamePro was generally positive to its gameplay, the race tracks and the selection of the cars, but considered that there were better racing games on Nintendo 64. (Note: GamePro gave the game two 3.5/5 scores for graphics and fun factor, and two 4/5 scores for sound and control in one review.) In another GamePro review, The Bamboo Carabao said that the game was a welcome change of pace for those who want more of a simulation than Beetle Adventure Racing, but less complex and demanding than World Driver Championship. (Note: GamePro gave the game two 4/5 scores for graphics and control, and two 3/5 scores for sound and fun factor in another review.)
