= Top Gear (video game) =

1992 video game

- North American cover art
- Developer: Gremlin Graphics
- Publisher: Kemco
- Programmers: Ashley Bennett; Ritchie Brannan; Simon Blake
- Artist: Paul Gregory
- Composers: Barry Leitch; Hiroyuki Masuno
- Series: Top Gear
- Platform: Super Nintendo Entertainment System
- Release: JP: 27 March 1992; NA: 16 April 1992; EU: 19 November 1992
- Genre: Racing
- Modes: Single-player, multiplayer

Top Gear (Note: Also known as Top Racer (Japanese: トップレーサー, Hepburn: Toppu Rēsā) in Japan) is a 1992 racing video game developed by Gremlin Graphics and published by Kemco for the Super Nintendo Entertainment System. The objective of the game is to become the fastest driver in the world by racing other drivers across several nations.

It marks the first game in the Top Gear racing game franchise, and it is one of the first racing games to be released on the SNES. This game and its next two sequels were created by the same developers as the similar Lotus series of games was released earlier on the Amiga and Mega Drive.

== Gameplay ==
The game uses a split screen layout specifically for multiplayer.

Top Gear is a third-person racing game where players compete across multiple countries, aiming to qualify for successive stages by finishing each race within the top five positions. Players can choose between single-player or two-player split-screen modes, select a difficulty level, and configure various options such as speed display (mph or km/h).

At the start, players register a name and choose between manual or automatic transmission. Manual mode requires gear-shifting using the controller's shoulder buttons, while automatic mode handles shifting automatically. Four controller layouts are available, allowing players to remap acceleration, braking, gear-shifting, and nitro boost controls.

The game features four cars, each with unique handling characteristics, top speeds, and fuel consumption rates. For example, the Cannibal emphasizes high speed but has low tire grip and high fuel consumption, while the Sidewinder offers superior cornering and lower fuel usage. Nitro boosts provide temporary speed bursts, but each race limits players to three boosts.

Races take place across four-course regions, with points awarded based on finishing positions. A cumulative ranking after each set of four races determines whether the player advances to the next region. Fuel management is crucial, as running out of fuel ends a race; players may refuel during pit stops, though this costs valuable time. The game also includes day and night races, as well as hazards such as road obstacles, which can significantly slow players upon collision.

== Development and release ==
The soundtrack for Top Gear was developed using the capabilities of the Super Nintendo Entertainment System’s SPC700 sound chip, which offered eight audio channels—an impressive feature for its time. The development team utilized the SNES ICE development kit, which included a removable ISA-based sound card. This card could be installed on a standard PC, allowing the team to compose music using custom software called MEDIT, which supported multiple platforms such as the Roland MT-32, AdLib, and the SNES. (Support for the Sega Genesis’ audio hardware was not implemented.)

During the early stages of development, the composer experimented with the SNES music driver to explore its potential. Although most of the technical documentation was in Japanese (Kanji), the data structure was reverse-engineered through trial and error. One notable discovery was the SNES’s real-time echo effect, made possible by its audio DSP—a feature uncommon in contemporary consoles. However, the effect consumed significant memory, which led to the Top Gear soundtrack using a precise echo of one sixteenth note, the maximum length that could be accommodated within the system’s limitations.

The game’s soundtrack, composed by Scottish musician Barry Leitch, became a defining aspect of its legacy. Leitch later recalled that the music was created under a tight production schedule, with some tracks reworked from his earlier compositions for Lotus Turbo Challenge and its sequels due to time constraints. The "Vegas" track, for example, was one of the first pieces written for Top Gear, featuring Leitch’s preferred chord progressions and melodic structures.

The game (under the title Top Racer), along with several other retro titles, was released by Piko Interactive on a multi-cart for the Evercade handheld gaming system in 2020.

Developer QUByte Interactive released the game for modern systems under the name Top Racer Collection on March 7, 2024.

== Reception ==
Reception

Review scores
Publication	Score
AllGame	4/5
Computer and Video Games	93/100
Famitsu	8/10, 7/10, 8/10, 6/10
Game Players	8/10
Official Nintendo Magazine	85%
Super Play	76%
Total!	93%
Control	79%, 81%, 90%
Mean Machines	92%
N-Force	91%
Nintendo Game Zone	86/100
SNES Force	88%
Super Action	93%
The Super Famicom	63/10
Super Gamer	89%
Super Pro	69/100

Top Gear received a 20.82/30 score in a 1993 readers' poll conducted by Super Famicom Magazine, ranking among Super Famicom titles at the number 142 spot. The game was met with positive reception from critics and reviewers alike since its release.

== Legacy ==
Top Gear gained notable popularity in Brazil during the early 1990s, becoming one of the country’s most recognized racing games of the era. Released for the Super Nintendo Entertainment System (SNES) in 1992 by Kemco, the title competed with other early racing games on the platform, such as F-Zero, Super Mario Kart, and Lamborghini American Challenge. The widespread presence of video game rental shops and the prevalence of console piracy in Brazil at the time contributed to the game’s enduring reach and influence among players.

Decades later, the Top Gear soundtrack—particularly its main theme—has achieved cult status, inspiring thousands of fan covers and tributes on platforms such as YouTube. Its influence extended to modern racing titles, most notably Horizon Chase, a spiritual successor developed by Aquiris Game Studio from Porto Alegre, which recruited Barry Leitch to compose its soundtrack as a homage to the classic SNES racer.
