= Kemco =

Japanese video game development studio

Kemco Co., Ltd.
- Logo since 1999
- Industry: Video games
- Founded: 1984; 42 years ago
- Headquarters: Kure, Hiroshima, Japan
- Number of employees: 140 (2019)
- Website: kemco-games.com

Kemco Co., Ltd. (株式会社ケムコ, Kabushiki gaisha Kemuko), from Kotobuki Engineering & Manufacturing Co., Ltd., is a Japanese video game developer and publisher established in 1984. It is headquartered in Kure, Hiroshima.

Its best known franchises are the Kid Klown and Top Gear series, the latter developed by Sheffield-based English developers Gremlin Graphics.

== History ==
Kemco was founded in 1984 as Kotobuki System Co., Ltd. to be the video game subsidiary of the multifaceted corporation Kotobuki Engineering & Manufacturing Co., Ltd. (established in 1979). The name represents the initial letters of Kotobuki Engineering Manufacturing Co.

Kemco started by developing video games for the Nintendo Entertainment System. Although technically called Kotobuki System until 2004, the company was already using the brand Kemco on its first game Dough Boy in 1985.

From the late 1980s until the early 1990s, Kemco's video games were distributed in North America by Seika Corporation of Torrance, California, under the joint label of Kemco * Seika.

In the 1990s, Kemco developed, ported, and published video games for several platforms including the NES, Super NES, Nintendo 64, and Game Boy. The company's first North American subsidiary, Kemco America, operated from October 2, 1991, to January 24, 2000.

In 2001, Kemco USA was founded as a wholly owned subsidiary of Kemco of Japan, especially targeting the American market.

In 2004, Kotobuki's system development division split to become the company Kotobuki Solution Co., Ltd., keeping the Kemco video game brand in the spin-off. Two of its executives, Colin Gordon and Glenn Halseth, left Kemco to form its own video game company that acted as a spiritual successor to Kemco USA, Valcon Games.

Since the 2010s, Kemco has been primarily known for its mobile games. Kemco USA closed in 2007, but products continue to be released in North America through Kemco of Japan.

== See also ==
- List of Kemco games
