= 1989 in video games =

1989 saw many sequels and prequels in video games, such as Phantasy Star II, Super Mario Land, Super Monaco GP, and Castlevania III: Dracula's Curse, along with new titles such as Big Run, Bonk's Adventure, Final Fight, Golden Axe, Strider, Hard Drivin' and Teenage Mutant Ninja Turtles. The year also saw the release of the Sega Genesis, TurboGrafx-16 and Atari Lynx in North America, plus the Game Boy worldwide along with Tetris and Super Mario Land.

The year's highest-grossing arcade video games in Japan were Namco's Final Lap and Sega's Tetris; in the United States they were Double Dragon, Super Off Road and Hard Drivin' among dedicated arcade cabinets and Capcom Bowling and Ninja Gaiden among arcade conversion kits. The year's best‑selling home system was the Nintendo Entertainment System (Famicom) for the sixth year in a row, while the year's best-selling home video games were Super Mario Bros. 3 in Japan and RoboCop in the United Kingdom.

== Financial performance ==
=== Highest-grossing arcade games ===
==== Japan ====
In Japan, the following titles were the highest-grossing arcade video games of 1989.

Rank	Gamest		Game Machine	
Rank	Title	Manufacturer	Dedicated arcade cabinet	Software conversion kit
1	Tetris	Sega	Final Lap	Tetris (Sega)
2	Winning Run	Namco	Chase H.Q.	World Stadium
3	Super Monaco GP	Sega	Operation Thunderbolt	Truxton
4	Power Drift	Sega	Winning Run (deluxe)	Image Fight
5	Image Fight	Irem	Out Run (deluxe)	Shanghai II
6	Final Lap	Namco	Top Landing	Kyukyoku Tiger (Twin Cobra)f
7	Tenchi wo Kurau	Capcom	Power Drift (deluxe)	Shanghai
8	Ghouls 'n Ghosts	Capcom	Super Monaco GP (deluxe)	Sichuan
9	Turbo OutRun	Sega	Metal Hawk	Birdie Try
10	Chase H.Q.	Taito	Turbo OutRun	Galaga '88

==== Hong Kong and United Kingdom ====
In Hong Kong and the United Kingdom, the following titles were the top-grossing arcade games of each month.

Month	Hong Kong (Bondeal)			United Kingdom		
Month	Dedicated cabinet	Conversion kit	Ref	Title	Manufacturer	Ref
February	Unknown	Unknown		Strider	Capcom	
March	Unknown	Unknown		Strider	Capcom	
April	Unknown	Unknown		Strider	Capcom	
November	Hard Drivin'	Burning Force		Unknown		
December	Teenage Mutant Ninja Turtles	Pang		Unknown		
December	Teenage Mutant Ninja Turtles	Burning Force		Unknown		

==== United States ====
In the United States, the following titles were the highest-grossing arcade games of 1989.

Rank	AMOA		RePlay		AMAA
Rank	Dedicated arcade cabinet	Conversion kit	Dedicated cabinet	Conversion kit	AMAA
1	Double Dragon	Capcom Bowling	Super Off Road	Ninja Gaiden	Hard Drivin'
2	Bad Dudes Vs. DragonNinja, Operation Thunderbolt, Super Off Road, John Elway's Quarterback	Ninja Gaiden, Shinobi, Tetris (Atari); Cabal	Hard Drivin'	Cabal	Tetris (Atari)
3	Bad Dudes Vs. DragonNinja, Operation Thunderbolt, Super Off Road, John Elway's Quarterback	Ninja Gaiden, Shinobi, Tetris (Atari); Cabal	Operation Thunderbolt	Golden Axe	Cabal, Crime Fighters, Chase H.Q., Operation Thunderbolt
4	Bad Dudes Vs. DragonNinja, Operation Thunderbolt, Super Off Road, John Elway's Quarterback	Ninja Gaiden, Shinobi, Tetris (Atari); Cabal	Chase H.Q.	WWF Superstars	Cabal, Crime Fighters, Chase H.Q., Operation Thunderbolt
5	Bad Dudes Vs. DragonNinja, Operation Thunderbolt, Super Off Road, John Elway's Quarterback	Ninja Gaiden, Shinobi, Tetris (Atari); Cabal	Narc	Capcom Bowling	Cabal, Crime Fighters, Chase H.Q., Operation Thunderbolt
6	—N/a		S.T.U.N. Runner, Super Monaco GP, Turbo OutRun, Big Run	Mechanized Attack, Midnight Resistance, Caliber .50	Cabal, Crime Fighters, Chase H.Q., Operation Thunderbolt
7	—N/a		S.T.U.N. Runner, Super Monaco GP, Turbo OutRun, Big Run	Mechanized Attack, Midnight Resistance, Caliber .50	Superman, U.S. Classic
8	—N/a		S.T.U.N. Runner, Super Monaco GP, Turbo OutRun, Big Run	Mechanized Attack, Midnight Resistance, Caliber .50	Superman, U.S. Classic
9	—N/a		S.T.U.N. Runner, Super Monaco GP, Turbo OutRun, Big Run	—N/a	—N/a
10	—N/a		Mechanized Attack, Midnight Resistance	—N/a	—N/a
11	—N/a		Mechanized Attack, Midnight Resistance	—N/a	—N/a

=== Best-selling home systems ===
Rank	System(s)	Manufacturer	Type	Generation	Sales				
Rank	System(s)	Manufacturer	Type	Generation	Japan	USA	Europe	Korea	Worldwide
1	Nintendo Entertainment System	Nintendo	Console	8-bit	1,520,000	9,200,000	180,000+	20,000	10,920,000+
2	Game Boy	Nintendo	Handheld	8-bit	1,480,000	1,000,000	—N/a	—N/a	2,500,000
3	Commodore 64	Commodore	Computer	8-bit	—N/a	—N/a	—N/a	—N/a	1,250,000
4	PC Engine / TurboGrafx-16	NEC	Console	16-bit	920,000	300,000	Unknown	Unknown	1,220,000+
5	NEC UltraLite / PC-88 / PC-98	NEC	Computer	8-bit / 16-bit	1,030,000	115,800+	Unknown	Unknown	1,145,800+
6	Mega Drive / Genesis	Sega	Console	16-bit	600,000	500,000	—N/a	—N/a	1,100,000
7	Macintosh	Apple Inc.	Computer	16-bit	—N/a	—N/a	—N/a	—N/a	1,100,000
8	IBM Personal Computer (IBM PC)	IBM	Computer	16-bit	Unknown	748,600+	Unknown	Unknown	748,600+
9	Mark III / Master System	Sega	Console	8-bit	200,000	Unknown	350,000	130,000	680,000+
10	Amiga	Commodore	Computer	16-bit	—N/a	—N/a	—N/a	—N/a	600,000

=== Best-selling home video games ===
==== Japan ====
The following titles were the top ten best-selling home video games of 1989 in Japan, according to the annual Family Computer Magazine (Famimaga) charts.

Rank	Title	Developer(s)	Publisher(s)	Genre(s)	Sales	Platform(s)
1	Super Mario Bros. 3	Nintendo R&D4	Nintendo	Platformer	< 3,840,000	Famicom
2	Tetris	BPS / Nintendo R&D1	BPS / Nintendo	Puzzle	Unknown	FC / GB
3	Famista '89: Kaimaku Ban!	Namco	Namco	Sports (baseball)	Unknown	Famicom
4	SD Gundam World Gachapon Senshi 2	Human Entertainment	Bandai	Strategy	Unknown	Famicom
5	Dragon Ball 3: Goku Den	TOSE	Bandai	RPG / card battle	< 760,000	Famicom
6	Mother (EarthBound Beginnings)	Ape Inc.	Nintendo	RPG	< 400,000	Famicom
7	Kyuukyoku Harikiri Stadium: Heisei Gannenhan	Taito	Taito	Sports (baseball)	Unknown	Famicom
8	Famicom Jump: Hero Retsuden	TOSE	Bandai	Action RPG	Unknown	Famicom
9	Famista '90	Namco		Sports (baseball)	Unknown	Famicom
10	Family Stadium '88	Namco		Sports (baseball)	Unknown	Famicom

==== United Kingdom ====
In the United Kingdom, RoboCop for the ZX Spectrum was the best-selling home video game of 1989. The following titles were the best-selling home video games of each month in the United Kingdom during 1989.

Month	Title	Developer	Publisher	Platform(s)	Ref
January	Operation Wolf	Taito	Ocean Software	Computers	
February	Operation Wolf	Taito	Ocean Software	Computers	
March	Operation Wolf	Taito	Ocean Software	Computers	
April	RoboCop	Data East	Ocean Software	8-bit micros	
May	RoboCop	Data East	Ocean Software	8-bit micros	
June	RoboCop	Data East	Ocean Software	8-bit micros	
July	RoboCop	Data East	Ocean Software	Computers	
August	RoboCop	Data East	Ocean Software	Computers	
September	Crazy Cars	Titus	Titus	8-bit micros	
October	Crazy Cars	Titus	Titus	Computers	
November	Paperboy	Atari Games	Elite	8-bit micros	
December	Chase H.Q.	Taito	Ocean Software	Computers	
1989	RoboCop	Data East	Ocean Software	ZX Spectrum	

==== United States ====
In the United States, the following titles were the best-selling home video games of each month in 1989.

Month	Bundle	Standalone	Platform	Ref
January	Unknown	Super Mario Bros. 2	NES	
February	Super Mario Bros./Duck Hunt	Super Mario Bros. 2	NES	
March	Unknown	Super Mario Bros. 2	NES	
April	Unknown	Super Mario Bros. 2	NES	
May	Unknown	Super Mario Bros. 2	NES	
June	Unknown	Super Mario Bros. 2	NES	
July	Unknown	Super Mario Bros. 2	NES	
August	Unknown	Super Mario Bros. 2	NES	
September	Unknown	Super Mario Bros. 2	NES	
October	Super Mario Bros./Duck Hunt	Super Mario Bros. 2	NES	
November	Unknown	Zelda II: The Adventure of Link	NES	
December	Tetris		Game Boy	

== Top-rated games ==
=== Major awards ===
==== Japan and United Kingdom ====
Award	3rd Gamest Awards (Japan, December 1989)	4th Famitsu Best Hit Game Awards (Japan, February 1990)	4th Famimaga Game Awards (Japan, February 1990)		7th Golden Joystick Awards (UK, April 1990)	
Award	Arcade	Console	Famicom	Game Boy	8-bit computer	16-bit computer
Game of the Year	Tetris (Sega)	Final Fantasy II		Tetris	The Untouchables	Kick Off
Critics' Choice Awards	Gain Ground; Image Fight; Super Monaco GP; Winning Run	Idol Hakkenden (Famicom); Castlevania III: Dracula's Curse (Famicom); Gunhed (PC Engine); Sweet Home (Famicom); Far East of Eden: Ziria (PCD); Dragon Ball 3: Goku Den (Famicom); Pachio-kun 2 (Famicom)	—N/a	—N/a	—N/a	—N/a
Best Coin-Op Conversion	—N/a	—N/a	—N/a	—N/a	Chase H.Q.	Hard Drivin'
Best Game Design / Planning	—N/a	Daichi-kun Crisis: Do Natural (PC Engine)	—N/a	—N/a	—N/a	—N/a
Best Playability	—N/a	—N/a	Final Fantasy II	Tetris	—N/a	—N/a
Best Scenario / Story	—N/a	Famicom Detective Club 2 (Famicom)	—N/a	—N/a	—N/a	—N/a
Best Production	Strider HiryūI (Strider)	—N/a	—N/a	—N/a	—N/a	—N/a
Best Graphics	Darius II	—N/a	—N/a	—N/a	Myth	Shadow of the Beast
Best Music / Sound	Valkyrie no Densetsu	Mother (EarthBound Beginnings)	Final Fantasy II	Tetris	Chase H.Q.	Future Wars
Best Game Company	Namco	—N/a	—N/a	—N/a	Ocean Software	
Special Award	CP System	—N/a	—N/a	—N/a	—N/a	—N/a
Best Originality / Original Game	—N/a	—N/a	Final Fantasy II	Tetris	Populous	
Best Character / Character Design	Valkyrie (Valkyrie no Densetsu)	Quinty (Mendel Palace)	SD Gundam World Gachapon Senshi 2	Pinball: 66 Hiki no Wani Daikoushin	—N/a	—N/a
Best Group	Tetris Blocks (Tetris)	—N/a	—N/a	—N/a	—N/a	—N/a
Best Action Game	Strider HiryūI (Strider)		Downtown Nekketsu Monogatari (Famicom)		—N/a	—N/a
Best Shooting Game	Area 88		TwinBee 3: Poko Poko Daimaō (Famicom)		—N/a	—N/a
Best Adventure Game	—N/a		Yūyūki (Famicom Disk System)		—N/a	—N/a
Best RPG	—N/a	Final Fantasy II (Famicom)			—N/a	—N/a
Best Simulation Game	—N/a		N/A		Carrier Command	M1 Tank Platoon
Best Sports Game	—N/a		Famista '89: Kaimaku Ban! (Famicom)		N/A	
Best PC Leisure Product	—N/a	—N/a	N/A		Indiana Jones and the Last Crusade	

==== United States ====
Award	Electronic Gaming Monthly (December 1989)	VideoGames & Computer Entertainment (February 1990)			2nd Nintendo Power Awards (May/June 1990)	Computer Entertainer Awards of Excellence (December 1989)	
Award	Console	Console	Computer	Arcade	NES	Console	Computer
Game of the Year	Ghouls 'n Ghosts (Sega Genesis)	The Legendary Axe (TG16)	Populous	S.T.U.N. Runner	Teenage Mutant Ninja Turtles	—N/a	—N/a
Genesis Game of the Year	Ghouls 'n Ghosts (Sega Genesis)	Thunder Force II (Genesis)	—N/a	—N/a	—N/a	Ghouls 'n Ghosts	—N/a
Master System Game of the Year	Wonder Boy III: The Dragon's Trap	—N/a	—N/a	—N/a	—N/a	SpellCaster	—N/a
Nintendo Game of the Year	Ninja Gaiden (NES)	—N/a	—N/a	—N/a	Teenage Mutant Ninja Turtles (NES)		—N/a
TurboGrafx Game of the Year	The Legendary Axe (TurboGrafx-16)		—N/a	—N/a	—N/a	Dungeon Explorer	—N/a
Computer Entertainment Programs of the Year	—N/a	—N/a	—N/a	—N/a	—N/a	—N/a	Shadow of the Beast (Amiga); Prince of Persia (Apple II); Powerdrome (Atari ST); Windwalker (C64/C128); Budokan (MS-DOS); Cosmic Osmo (Mac)
Best Coin-Op Conversion	—N/a	Ghouls 'n Ghosts (Genesis)	Arkanoid	—N/a	—N/a	—N/a	—N/a
Best Multiplayer Game	—N/a	—N/a	—N/a	Crime Fighters	Tecmo Bowl	—N/a	—N/a
Best Hardware	Sega Genesis	—N/a	—N/a	—N/a	—N/a	—N/a	—N/a
Best Theme / Fun	—N/a	—N/a	—N/a	—N/a	Teenage Mutant Ninja Turtles	—N/a	—N/a
Best Play Control	—N/a	—N/a	—N/a	—N/a	Mega Man 2	—N/a	—N/a
Most Challenge	Phantasy Star (Master System)	—N/a	—N/a	—N/a	Ninja Gaiden	—N/a	—N/a
Best Graphics	Ghouls 'n Ghosts (Sega Genesis)	Thunder Force II (Genesis)	David Wolf	—N/a	Mega Man 2	—N/a	Shadow of the Beast (Amiga)
Best Music / Sound	Fighting Street (TurboGrafx-CD)	Thunder Force II (Genesis)	David Wolf	—N/a	Mega Man 2	—N/a	Shadow of the Beast (Amiga)
Developer / Software House	Sega, Konami, Acclaim, Sunsoft, Tecmo	—N/a	—N/a	—N/a	—N/a	—N/a	—N/a
Best Character / Hero	Mega Man (Mega Man 2)	—N/a	—N/a	—N/a	Link (Zelda II: The Adventure of Link)	—N/a	—N/a
Best Sequel	Mega Man 2 and Ghouls 'n Ghosts (tie)	—N/a	—N/a	—N/a	—N/a	—N/a	—N/a
Original / Special / Innovative	—N/a	A Boy and His Blob (NES)	Star Saga One	Escape from the Planet of the Robot Monsters	—N/a	Romance of the Three Kingdoms	Populous
Best Action / Combat / Arcade-Style Game	—N/a	Teenage Mutant Ninja Turtles (NES)	Hostage	Dynamite Duke	—N/a	—N/a	Blood Money
Best Adventure / Fantasy	—N/a	Zelda II: The Adventure of Link (NES)	Manhunter: New York	—N/a	—N/a	—N/a	The Third Courier
Best RPG	Ultima III: Exodus (NES)	—N/a	—N/a	—N/a	—N/a	—N/a	—N/a
Best Simulation Game	—N/a	Alien Crush (TG16)	Vette!	—N/a	—N/a	—N/a	Vette!
Best Sports Game	World Class Baseball; Tommy Lasorda Baseball; Baseball Simulator 1.000	Tommy Lasorda Baseball (Sega Genesis)	Zany Golf	Cyberball	—N/a	Goal! (NES); Tommy Lasorda Baseball (GEN)	TV Sports: Football (Amiga); John Madden Football (Apple II); Kings of the Beach (C64); Grave Yardage (MS-DOS); PlayMaker Football (Mac)
Best Driving Simulator	—N/a	—N/a	—N/a	Hard Drivin'	—N/a	—N/a	—N/a
Best Flying Game	—N/a	—N/a	—N/a	Metal Hawk	—N/a	—N/a	—N/a
Best Strategy / Wargame	—N/a	A Boy and his Blob (NES)	SimCity	—N/a	—N/a	—N/a	Sands of Fire
Best Action-Strategy Game	—N/a	Mega Man 2 (NES)	Lords of the Rising Sun	—N/a	—N/a	—N/a	—N/a
Best Video Game Controller	Joycard Sansui SSS	—N/a	—N/a	—N/a	—N/a	—N/a	—N/a
Coolest Boss / Best Group	Loki (Ghouls 'n Ghosts); Jagu (The Legendary Axe)	—N/a	—N/a	—N/a	—N/a	—N/a	—N/a
Best Movie to Game	Batman: The Video Game	—N/a	—N/a	—N/a	—N/a	—N/a	—N/a
Best Ending in a Video Game	Ninja Gaiden	—N/a	—N/a	—N/a	Ninja Gaiden	—N/a	—N/a

=== Critically acclaimed titles ===
==== Famitsu and CVG reviews ====
In Japan, the following 1989 video game releases entered Famitsu magazine's "Platinum Hall of Fame" for receiving Famitsu scores of at least 35 out of 40.

Title	Platform	Score (out of 40)	Developer(s)	Publisher	Genre
Makai Toushi SaGa (Final Fantasy Legend)	Game Boy	35	Squaresoft	Squaresoft	Role-playing
Ys I & II	PC Engine CD-ROM²	35	Nihon Falcom / Alfa System	Hudson Soft	Action role-playing

In the United Kingdom, the following titles were Computer and Video Games (CVG) magazine's highest-rated games of 1989.

Home video games			Arcade games	
Title	Platform	Score	Rank	Title
Chase H.Q.	ZX Spectrum	97%	1	S.T.U.N. Runner
Super Mario Bros. 2	Nintendo Entertainment System	97%	2	Super Monaco GP
Indianapolis 500: The Simulation	PC	96%	3	Winning Run
Populous	Amiga	96%	4	Hard Drivin'
Ghouls 'n Ghosts	Sega Mega Drive	96%	5	Narc
F29 Retaliator	Amiga	96%	—N/a	—N/a
Gunhed (Blazing Lazers)	PC Engine	96%	—N/a	—N/a
Xenon 2: Megablast	Amiga	96%	—N/a	—N/a
It Came from the Desert	Amiga	95%	—N/a	—N/a
Damocles	Atari ST	95%	—N/a	—N/a
Tetris	Game Boy	95%	—N/a	—N/a
RoboCop	ZX Spectrum	95%	—N/a	—N/a

==== English-language reviews ====
Notable video game releases in 1989 that have accumulated overall critical acclaim from at least four contemporary English-language sources include:

Title	Genre	Publisher	Platform	Number of reviews
Apache 3	Rail shooter	Data East	Arcade	4
Arthur: The Quest for Excalibur	Interactive fiction	Infocom	Amiga	8
Big Run	Racing	Jaleco	Arcade	4
Blazing Lazers	Shoot 'em up	Hudson Soft	TurboGrafx-16	4
Chase H.Q.	Action-racing	Ocean Software	ZX Spectrum	5
Chase HQ II: Special Criminal Investigation	Action-racing	Taito	Arcade	6
Crack Down	Run & gun shooter	Sega	Arcade	5
Dragon Breed	Scrolling shooter	Irem	Arcade	6
Dungeon Explorer	Action role-playing	Hudson Soft	TurboGrafx-16	4
Dynasty Wars	Beat 'em up	Capcom	Arcade	4
F-16 Combat Pilot	Combat flight simulation	Digital Integration	Amiga	7
F-16 Combat Pilot	Combat flight simulation	Digital Integration	Atari ST	4
F-16 Combat Pilot	Combat flight simulation	Digital Integration	MS-DOS	4
Forgotten Worlds	Shoot 'em up	U.S. Gold	Amiga	6
Forgotten Worlds	Shoot 'em up	U.S. Gold	Commodore 64	5
Forgotten Worlds	Shoot 'em up	U.S. Gold	ZX Spectrum	5
Ghouls 'n Ghosts	Platformer	Capcom	Arcade	6
Ghouls 'n Ghosts	Platformer	Sega	Mega Drive/Genesis	10
Ghouls 'n Ghosts	Platformer	U.S. Gold	Amiga	4
Golden Axe	Beat 'em up	Sega	Arcade	6
Golden Axe	Beat 'em up	Sega	Mega Drive/Genesis	10
Hard Drivin'	Racing simulation	Atari Games	Arcade	5
Indiana Jones and the Last Crusade: The Graphic Adventure	Graphic adventure	Lucasfilm Games	MS-DOS	4
Interphase	Shooter	Image Works	Atari ST	5
Interphase	Shooter	Image Works	Amiga	9
Mechanized Attack	Rail shooter	SNK	Arcade	4
Midnight Resistance	Run & gun shooter	Data East	Arcade	4
Myth: History in the Making	Platformer	System 3	Commodore 64	4
Ninja Gaiden (Shadow Warriors)	Beat 'em up	Tecmo	Arcade	4
Ninja Gaiden (Shadow Warriors)	Hack & slash	Tecmo	NES	5
Operation Thunderbolt	Light gun shooter	Taito	Arcade	5
Phantasy Star II	Role-playing	Sega	Mega Drive/Genesis	8
Populous	God	Electronic Arts	Amiga	9
The Revenge of Shinobi	Hack & slash	Sega	Mega Drive/Genesis	10
R-Type II	Shoot 'em up	Irem	Arcade	6
SimCity	City-building	Maxis	Amiga	7
Strider	Hack & slash	Capcom	Arcade	5
Strider	Hack & slash	U.S. Gold	Amiga	4
Strider	Hack & slash	U.S. Gold	Atari ST	7
Stunt Car Racer	Racing	MicroStyle	Amiga	7
Stunt Car Racer	Racing	MicroStyle	Atari ST	7
Stunt Car Racer	Racing	MicroStyle	Commodore 64	4
Super Mario Land	Platformer	Nintendo	Game Boy	4
Super Monaco GP	Racing simulation	Sega	Arcade	5
The Untouchables	Action-adventure	Ocean Software	Amiga	4
The Untouchables	Action-adventure	Ocean Software	Atari ST	4
The Untouchables	Action-adventure	Ocean Software	ZX Spectrum	4
Willow	Platformer	Capcom	Arcade	4
Winning Run	Racing simulation	Namco	Arcade	4
Wonder Boy III: The Dragon's Trap	Platform-adventure	Sega	Master System	10
Xenon 2: Megablast	Shoot 'em up	Image Works	Amiga	8
Xenon 2: Megablast	Shoot 'em up	Image Works	Atari ST	7
Ys: The Vanished Omens	Action role-playing	Sega	Master System	7
Ys I & II	Action role-playing	Hudson Soft	TurboGrafx-CD	7

== Events ==
- The Consumer Electronics Show (CES) is held at the Las Vegas Convention Center on January 7–10. Nintendo announces that it would release 40 new NES titles through its licensees in 1989, while Sega announces 20 titles that include several translations of arcade games. Peripherals unveiled and demonstrated at this event include Broderbund's U-Force, Beeshu's Zoomer, and Nintendo's Power Pad. The next CES is held in Chicago in June.
- CSG Imagesoft and Sony hold regional Super Dodge Ball contests in Los Angeles (July 15–16 and 29–30), Chicago (August 5–6), New York City (September 9–10 and 16–17), Boston (September 23–24), and Seattle (October 14–15). Finalists from each region enter the "Super Dodge Ball World Cup" in Seattle on October 27–28, where the winners receive an assortment of Sony products as prizes.
- In August, Capcom donates $50,000 worth of video game equipment and Capcom titles to pediatric wards of California hospitals.
- Sega of America ends its Master System distribution deal with Tonka, and appoints former Atari Corporation President Michael Katz as its new president in October.
- Konami launches the "Crumble Competition", in which participants win a free Konami title from rub-off cards found in specially marked packages of Chips Ahoy! and Oreo cookies. Konami also collaborates with Ralston Purina to create a breakfast cereal based on the Teenage Mutant Ninja Turtles.
- On October 3, Nintendo and Fidelity Investments announce plans to jointly develop a home trading system for financial services.
- NEC promotes the TurboGrafx-16 with contests held at local shopping centers in Los Angeles (October 6–8), Trumbull, Connecticut (October 21–22), Chicago (October 27–31), Wayne, New Jersey (November 11–12), Marlborough, Massachusetts (November 18–19) and Atlanta (December 2–3). The Los Angeles contest is won by 17-year-old Jim Hakola of Lakewood, California, who scored 220,080 points on Blazing Lazers.
- Corey Sandler and Tom Badgett's Ultimate Unauthorized Nintendo Game Strategies, the first in Bantam Books' "Game Mastery" series, is released in November.
- PepsiCo awards over 4,000 Game Boy systems via an under-the-cap contest across a variety of Pepsi soft drinks.
- The Galaxy of Electronic Games show, produced by Pinnacle Productions, opens at the San Jose Convention Center in November 17–19. The show features a display of more than 300 computer and video games and a 2,500 square foot area of arcade games.
- On December 2, the world premiere of the Universal Pictures film The Wizard is held at the Cineplex Odeon Theatre in Universal City, California. The film – starring Fred Savage, Luke Edwards, Jenny Lewis, Christian Slater and Beau Bridges – tells the story of two brothers who travel to a video game tournament.

== Hardware releases ==
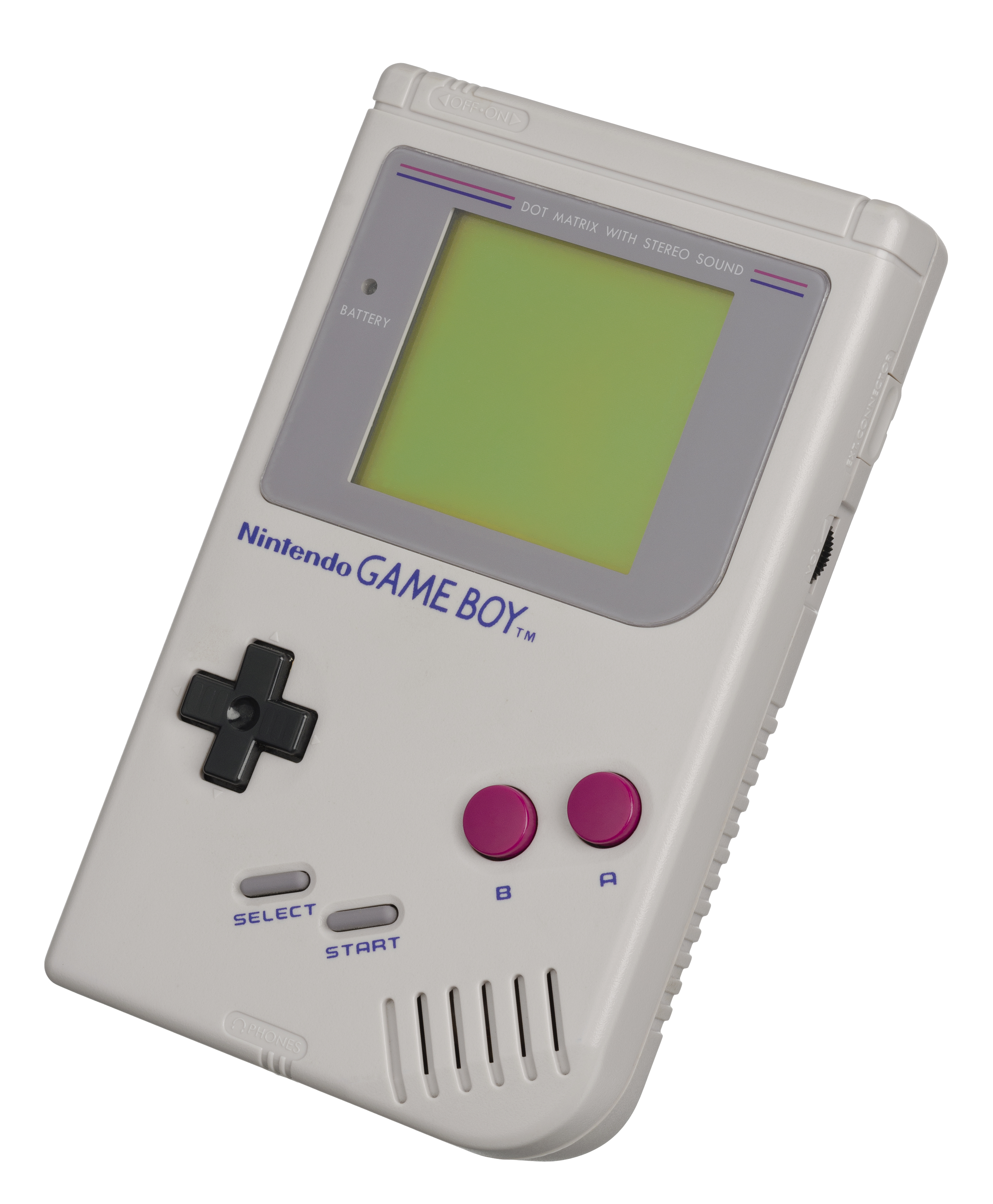
The original Game Boy.

- August 14 – The Mega Drive is released in North America as the Sega Genesis.
- August 29 – NEC's PC Engine released in North America as the TurboGrafx-16.
- October 11 – Atari Corporation releases the Lynx handheld console with color and backlighting.
- Nintendo releases the Game Boy handheld console.
- Mattel releases the Power Glove controller for the NES home console.

== Game releases ==
- February – Atari Games releases the Hard Drivin' arcade game, with filled polygon 3D graphics, physics simulation, and a force-feedback steering wheel.
- March 21 – Sega releases Phantasy Star II, a landmark title for the role-playing video game genre.
- April 21 – Nintendo releases Super Mario Land on the Game Boy, introducing Princess Daisy to the Mario series.
- May – Sega releases Golden Axe, the first game in the Golden Axe series.
- May 12 – Konami releases Teenage Mutant Ninja Turtles for NES, one of the first video games based on the 1987 Teenage Mutant Ninja Turtles animated series, being released after the show's second season.
- June 5 – Bullfrog releases Populous, one of the first commercially successful god games.
- June – Lucasfilm Games releases puzzle game Pipe Mania, which lives on in other titles as a visual representation of computer or security system hacking.
- July 11 – Capcom releases Mega Man 2 in more countries (US).
- July 27 – Nintendo releases Mother in Japan, the first of a trilogy of role-playing games produced by celebrity writer Shigesato Itoi.
- August – Nintendo of America introduces Enix's Dragon Warrior franchise to North America.
- August 26 – Nintendo releases the Zelda Game & Watch.
- September – Atari Games releases S.T.U.N. Runner in arcades, a 3D polygonal vehicle combat/racing game.
- September 14 – Capcom releases DuckTales for NES based on the Disney animated TV series of the same name.
- October 3 – Broderbund releases Prince of Persia for the declining Apple II. Ports to other systems turn the game into a hit.
- October 3 – Maxis releases Will Wright's SimCity, the first of the "Sim" games and a revolutionary real-time software toy.
- December 6 – Strategic Studies Group releases Warlords which was one of the first fantasy turn-based strategy game.
- December 15 – Hudson Soft releases Bonk's Adventure, introducing the TurboGrafx-16 mascot and starting the Bonk franchise.
- December 15 - Tecmo releases Bad News Baseball in Japan. US release to follow in January 1990.
- December 15 – Techno Soft releases Herzog Zwei for the Mega Drive in Japan, laying the foundations for the real-time strategy genre.
- December 22 – Konami releases Castlevania III: Dracula's Curse, the third and final game from series for NES.
- Tengen releases an unlicensed version of the Tetris video game, which is recalled after Nintendo sues Tengen.
- Wes Cherry writes Solitaire and Robert Donner writes Minesweeper, which are bundled with Microsoft Windows starting from version 3.
- Psygnosis releases a platformer Shadow of the Beast, demonstrating the capabilities of the Amiga and helping sales of the computer.
- Sega releases Wonder Boy III: The Dragon's Trap.
- Spectrum Holobyte's Vette! for PC and Macintosh features a 3D flat-shaded rendition of San Francisco.
- Three-Sixty Pacific releases computer wargame Harpoon.
- Atari Corporation supports the aging Atari 2600 with a new batch of cartridges, including Secret Quest.

== Business ==
- Hasbro, Inc. acquires elements of Coleco Industries, Inc.
- Trinity Acquisition Corporation founded (renamed THQ in 1990)
- Nintendo withdraws from the Japan Amusement Machinery Manufacturers Association (JAMMA) on February 28.
- Nintendo of America, Inc. v. Tengen:
1. Nintendo sues Tengen over the Tetris video game copyrights. Tengen loses and recalls all its Tetris games.
2. In November, Nintendo sues Tengen over production of unlicensed Nintendo games. Tengen loses. (Tengen originally sued Nintendo on December 12, 1988, for antitrust violations.)
- Nintendo v. Camerica Ltd. Nintendo sues Camerica over patent violations of the Game Genie for the NES console. Camerica wins the suit.
- UK publisher Martech goes out of business.

== See also ==
- 1989 in games
