= 1990 in video games =

1990 saw many sequels and prequels in video games, such as Metal Gear 2: Solid Snake, Dr. Mario, Dragon Quest IV, Final Fantasy III, Phantasy Star II, and Super Mario World, along with new titles such as Fire Emblem: Shadow Dragon and the Blade of Light and Magic Sword. The year's highest-grossing arcade video games were Final Fight in Japan and Teenage Mutant Ninja Turtles in the United States. The year's best‑selling system was the Game Boy, while the year's best-selling home video game was Super Mario Bros. 3 for the Nintendo Entertainment System.

== Financial performance ==
=== Highest-grossing arcade games ===
==== Japan ====
In Japan, the following titles were the top ten highest-grossing arcade video games of 1990.

Rank	Gamest		Game Machine	
Rank	Title	Manufacturer	Dedicated arcade cabinet	Software conversion kit
1	Final Fight	Capcom	Super Monaco GP (deluxe)	Tetris (Sega)
2	Tetris	Sega	Final Lap	Final Fight
3	Super Monaco GP	Sega	Winning Run: Suzuka GP (deluxe)	Tecmo World Cup '90
4	Columns	Sega	Special Criminal Investigation (S.C.I.)	Columns
5	Parodius Da! Shinwa kara Owarai e	Konami	Big Run	Adventure Quiz: Capcom World
6	Raiden	Tecmo	Beast Busters	Super Formula: Chijou Saisoku no Battle
7	Bloxeed	Sega	Hard Drivin'	Volfied
8	Final Lap	Namco	Out Run (deluxe)	Adventure Quiz: Capcom World 2
9	G-LOC: Air Battle	Sega	Operation Thunderbolt	Parodius Da! Shinwa kara Owarai e
10	Gradius III	Konami	G-LOC: Air Battle (deluxe)	M.V.P.

==== United Kingdom and Australia ====
In the United Kingdom and Australia, the following titles were the top-grossing arcade video games of each month.

Month	United Kingdom	Australia (Timezone)		Ref
Month	United Kingdom	Dedicated cabinet	Conversion kit	Ref
January	Teenage Mutant Ninja Turtles; Tecmo World Cup '90; Super Masters; Line of Fire	Unknown	Unknown	
February	Teenage Mutant Ninja Turtles; Tecmo World Cup '90; Super Masters; Line of Fire	Unknown	Unknown	
March	Teenage Mutant Ninja Turtles; Tecmo World Cup '90; Super Masters; Line of Fire	Unknown	Unknown	
July	Unknown	Teenage Mutant Ninja Turtles	Tecmo World Cup '90	
August	Unknown	Teenage Mutant Ninja Turtles	Magic Sword	

==== United States ====
In the United States, the following titles were the highest-grossing arcade video games of 1990.

Rank	AMOA		Play Meter	
Rank	Dedicated arcade cabinet	Conversion kit	Title	Manufacturer
1	Teenage Mutant Ninja Turtles	Final Fight	Teenage Mutant Ninja Turtles	Konami
2	Super Off Road, Turbo Outrun, Mercs	Capcom Bowling, Big Event Golf, Cyber Police ESWAT, Badlands	Unknown	
3	Super Off Road, Turbo Outrun, Mercs	Capcom Bowling, Big Event Golf, Cyber Police ESWAT, Badlands	Unknown	
4	Super Off Road, Turbo Outrun, Mercs	Capcom Bowling, Big Event Golf, Cyber Police ESWAT, Badlands	Unknown	
5	—N/a	Capcom Bowling, Big Event Golf, Cyber Police ESWAT, Badlands	Unknown	

The following were the top-grossing arcade video games on the monthly RePlay arcade charts in 1990.

Month	Title	Type	Points	Ref
January	Golden Axe	Software conversion kit	644	
February	Teenage Mutant Ninja Turtles	Dedicated cabinet	743	
March	Teenage Mutant Ninja Turtles	Dedicated cabinet	850	
April	Teenage Mutant Ninja Turtles	Dedicated cabinet	923	
May	Teenage Mutant Ninja Turtles	Dedicated cabinet	922	
June	Teenage Mutant Ninja Turtles	Dedicated cabinet	911	
July	Teenage Mutant Ninja Turtles	Dedicated cabinet	933	
August	Teenage Mutant Ninja Turtles	Dedicated cabinet	903	
September	Teenage Mutant Ninja Turtles	Dedicated cabinet	868	
October	Teenage Mutant Ninja Turtles	Dedicated cabinet	875	
November	Teenage Mutant Ninja Turtles	Dedicated cabinet	857	
December	Teenage Mutant Ninja Turtles	Dedicated cabinet	809	

==== Hong Kong ====
In Hong Kong, these were the top-grossing arcade video games of each month on the Bondeal charts.

Month	Dedicated arcade cabinet		Arcade conversion kit			Ref
January	Teenage Mutant Ninja Turtles		Pang	Burning Force	Lady Frog	
February	Hard Drivin'	Big Run	Roulette			
March	Big Run	Hard Drivin'	Roulette		Crude Buster	
April	Hard Drivin'	Big Run	Final Fight	Crude Buster		
May	Big Run		Rough Ranger			
June	Big Run	Hard Drivin'	Alien Storm		Mustang	
July	Big Run		Lightning Fighters	Combatribes	Smash TV	
August	Hard Drivin'	Big Run	Smash TV	Magic Sword		
September	Big Run	Hard Drivin'	Magic Sword		Smash TV	
October	Big Run		Smash TV		Pit-Fighter	
November	Big Run	Hard Drivin'	Pit-Fighter	Hydra	Pit-Fighter	
December	Four Trax	Cisco Heat	Double Dragon 3	Pit-Fighter	Super Pang	

=== Best-selling home systems ===
Rank	System(s)	Manufacturer	Type	Generation	Sales				
Rank	System(s)	Manufacturer	Type	Generation	Japan	USA	Europe	Korea	Worldwide
1	Game Boy	Nintendo	Handheld	8-bit	3,100,000	5,000,000	Unknown	Unknown	10,000,000
2	Nintendo Entertainment System	Nintendo	Console	8-bit	1,360,000	7,200,000	< 655,000	80,000	8,640,000+
3	IBM PC	IBM	Computer	16-bit	—N/a	—N/a	—N/a	—N/a	2,840,000
4	Sega Mega Drive / Genesis	Sega	Console	16-bit	900,000	1,000,000	193,000	43,000	2,136,000+
5	PC Engine / TurboGrafx-16	NEC	Console	16-bit	1,300,000	450,000	Unknown	Unknown	1,750,000+
6	Macintosh	Apple Inc.	Computer	16-bit	—N/a	—N/a	—N/a	—N/a	1,300,000
7	Master System	Sega	Console	8-bit	Unknown	300,000	725,000	180,000	1,205,000+
8	NEC PC-88 / PC-98	NEC	Computer	8-bit / 16-bit	1,100,000	Unknown	Unknown	Unknown	1,100,000+
9	Amiga	Commodore	Computer	16-bit	—N/a	—N/a	—N/a	—N/a	750,000
10	Commodore 64 (C64)	Commodore	Computer	8-bit	—N/a	—N/a	—N/a	—N/a	700,000

=== Best-selling home video games ===
==== Japan ====
In Japan, according to Famicom Tsūshin (Famitsu) magazine, the following titles were the top ten best-selling 1990 releases, including later sales up until 1992.

Rank	Title	Developer	Publisher	Genre	Platform	Sales
1	Super Mario World	Nintendo EAD	Nintendo	Platformer	SFC	< 3,550,000
2	Dragon Quest IV: Michibikareshi Monotachi	Chunsoft	Enix	RPG	Famicom	3,000,000
3	Final Fantasy III	Squaresoft	Squaresoft	RPG	Famicom	< 1,400,000
4	Dr. Mario	Nintendo R&D1	Nintendo	Puzzle	Famicom	Unknown
5	Dr. Mario	Nintendo R&D1	Nintendo	Puzzle	Game Boy	Unknown
6	Final Fight	Capcom	Capcom	Beat 'em up	SFC	< 860,000
7	SD Gundam: SD Sengokuden	Bandai	Bandai	TBT	Game Boy	Unknown
8	F-Zero	Nintendo EAD	Nintendo	Racing	SFC	Unknown
9	SD Hero Sōkessen: Taose! Aku no Gundam	Interlink	Banpresto	Platformer	Famicom	Unknown
10	Qix	Minakuchi	Nintendo	Puzzle	Game Boy	Unknown

The following titles were the best-selling home video games on the Japan game charts published by Famicom Tsūshin (Famitsu) and Family Computer Magazine (Famimaga) in 1990.

Month	Week 1	Week 2	Week 3	Week 4	Ref
January	Makai Toushi SaGa (Game Boy)				
February	Dragon Quest IV (Famicom)				
March	Dragon Quest IV (Famicom)			Mōryō Senki Madara (FC)	
April	Dragon Quest IV (Famicom)			Final Fantasy III (FC)	
May	Final Fantasy III (Famicom)			Tetris (Game Boy)	
June	Tetris (Game Boy)		Dragon Quest IV (Famicom)		
July	Tetris (Game Boy)		Dr. Mario (Famicom)		
August	Dr. Mario (Famicom)				
September	Dr. Mario (Famicom)		Famista (Game Boy)		
October	Unknown		Dragon Ball Z: Kyôshū! Saiyan (FC)		
November	F1 Race (Game Boy)		Super Mario World (Super Famicom)		
December	Super Mario World (Super Famicom)		Unknown		

==== United States ====
In the United States, Super Mario Bros. 3 was the best-selling home video game of 1990. The following titles were the best-selling home video games of each month in 1990.

Month	Standalone		Bundle	Sales	Revenue	
Month	Weeks 1-2	Weeks 3-4	Bundle	Sales	Nominal	Inflation
January	Tetris (Game Boy / NES)			Unknown	Unknown	Unknown
April	Super Mario Bros. 3 (NES)	Unknown	Unknown	250,000+	$12.5 million+	$31 million+
May	Super Mario Bros. 3 (NES)		Tetris (Game Boy)	Unknown	Unknown	Unknown
June	Super Mario Bros. 3 (NES)		Tetris (Game Boy)	Unknown	Unknown	Unknown
September	Super Mario Bros. 3 (NES)		Super Mario Bros./Duck Hunt (NES)	Unknown	Unknown	Unknown
November	Super Mario Bros. 3 (NES)		Unknown	Unknown	Unknown	Unknown
December	Super Mario Bros. 3 (NES)		Tetris (Game Boy)	Unknown	Unknown	Unknown
1990	Super Mario Bros. 3 (NES)			8,000,000	$500 million	$1,230 million

==== United Kingdom ====
In the United Kingdom, the following titles were the best-selling home video games of each month in 1990, for various home computer and game console platforms.

Month	Home computers	Master System	NES	Mega Drive	PC Engine	Ref
January	Chase H.Q.	California Games	Super Mario Bros. 2	—N/a	—N/a	
February	Paperboy	Unknown	Unknown	—N/a	—N/a	
March	Paperboy	Unknown	Unknown	Ghouls 'n Ghosts	Chase H.Q.	
April	Fantasy World Dizzy	Wonder Boy III	Unknown	New Zealand Story	PC Kid	
May	Fantasy World Dizzy	Unknown	Unknown	Final Blow	Atomic Robo Kid	
June	Italy 1990	Unknown	Unknown	Thunder Force III	Formation Soccer	
July	Italy 1990	Unknown	Unknown	Ghostbusters	Don Doko Don	
August	Pro Boxing Simulator	Golden Axe	Super Mario Bros. 2	Batman	Super Star Soldier	
September	Shadow Warriors	Golden Axe	Super Mario Bros. 2	Super Monaco GP	Devil Crash	
October	Guardian Angel	Golden Axe	Teenage Mutant Hero Turtles	Strider	Splatterhouse	
November	Out Run	Golden Axe	Teenage Mutant Hero Turtles	Strider	Devil Crash	
December	Teenage Mutant Hero Turtles	Golden Axe	Teenage Mutant Hero Turtles	Golden Axe	Aero Blasters	

== Top-rated games ==
=== Major awards ===
==== Japan ====
Award	4th Gamest Awards (Japan, December 1990)	5th Famitsu Best Hit Game Awards (Japan, February 1991)
Award	Arcade	Console
Game of the Year	Final Fight	Dragon Quest IV (Famicom)
Handheld Game of the Year	—N/a	SaGa 2 (Game Boy)
Coin-Op Translation / Conversion	—N/a	Gradius III (Super Famicom)
PC-to-Console Translation	—N/a	Populous (Super Famicom)
Best Scenario / Story	—N/a	Final Fantasy III (Famicom)
Best Graphics	R-Type II	Castle of Illusion (Mega Drive)
Best BGM / Sound	Gradius III	Dr. Mario
Best Album	Darius II	—N/a
Best Production	Parodius! From Myth to Laughter	—N/a
Special Award / Most Talk	Neo Geo	Super Famicom
Best Game Company / Manufacturer	Namco	—N/a
Best Character / Character Design	Mike Haggar (Final Fight)	Yoshi (Super Mario World)
Best Action Game	Final Fight	F-Zero (Super Famicom)
Best Shooting Game	Parodius! From Myth to Laughter	Super Star Soldier (PCE)
Best RPG	—N/a	Megami Tensei II (Famicom); Dragon Quest IV (Famicom)
Best Action RPG	—N/a	Ys II (Famicom); Sorcerian (Mega Drive)
Best Adventure Game	—N/a	Urusei Yatsura: Stay With You (PCE)
Best Simulation / Strategy Game	—N/a	Fire Emblem (Famicom)
Best Puzzle Game	—N/a	Dr. Mario
Best Sports Game	—N/a	Formation Soccer (PCE)

==== United Kingdom ====
Award	8th Golden Joystick Awards (United Kingdom, April 1991)			
Award	8-bit computer	16-bit computer	8-bit console	16-bit console
Game of the Year	Rick Dangerous 2	Kick Off 2	—N/a	—N/a
Best Console Game	—N/a	—N/a	Mega Man (NES)	John Madden Football (MD)
PC Game of the Year	Railroad Tycoon		—N/a	—N/a
Best Coin-Op Conversion	Rainbow Islands	Golden Axe	—N/a	—N/a
Best Graphics	Midnight Resistance	Shadow of the Beast 2	—N/a	—N/a
Best Soundtrack	RoboCop 2	Speedball 2	—N/a	—N/a
Hardware Manufacturer of the Year	Sega			
Software House of the Year	Ocean Software		—N/a	—N/a
Best Simulation	F19 Stealth Fighter		—N/a	—N/a

==== United States ====
Award	Electronic Gaming Monthly (United States, October 1990)	VideoGames & Computer Entertainment (United States, February 1991)	
Award	Console	Console	Computer
Game of the Year	Strider (Sega Genesis)	Phantasy Star II (Genesis)	It Came from the Desert
Game of the Year (Nintendo)	Castlevania III: Dracula's Curse (NES)	—N/a	—N/a
Game of the Year (TurboGrafx)	Ninja Spirit (TurboGrafx-16)	—N/a	—N/a
Handheld Game of the Year	Blue Lightning (Atari Lynx)	—N/a	—N/a
Coin-Op Translation / Conversion	—N/a	Columns (Genesis)	N.Y. Warrior
Best Graphics	Strider (Sega Genesis)	Phantasy Star II (Genesis)	Mean Streets
Best BGM / Sound	Ys I & II (TurboGrafx-CD)		Loom
Best System	Sega Genesis	—N/a	—N/a
Best New System	TurboExpress	—N/a	—N/a
Game Company / Manufacturer	Natsume, Sega, Capcom, Konami, Nintendo	—N/a	—N/a
Software House of the Year	Natsume, Sega, Capcom, Konami, Nintendo	—N/a	—N/a
Best Sequel to an Existing Game	Mega Man 3	—N/a	—N/a
Innovative Game / New Theme	Bonk's Adventure	Super Glove Ball	DragonStrike
Best Action Game	—N/a	Bonk's Adventure (TG16)	Prince of Persia
Best RPG	Ys I & II (TurboGrafx-CD)	—N/a	—N/a
Best Adventure Game	—N/a	Ys I & II (TG16); Phantasy Star II (Genesis)	Conquests of Camelot
Best Simulation Game	—N/a	Devil's Crush (TG16)	LHX Attack Chopper
Best Strategy Game	—N/a	Populous (Genesis)	Spot: The Video Game
Best Military-Strategy Game	—N/a	Herzog Zwei (Genesis); Military Madness (TG16)	Battles of Napoleon
Best Action-Strategy Game	—N/a	Klax	Pipe Dream
Best Sports Game	Super Monaco GP (Sega Genesis)	TV Sports: Football (TG16)	TV Sports: Basketball
Best Sports Simulation	—N/a	—N/a	PGA Tour Golf
Best Board Game	—N/a	—N/a	Clue: Master Detective
Best Science-Fiction Game	—N/a	Whip Rush (Genesis)	Star Control
Most Challenging Video Game	Phantasy Star II (Sega Genesis)	—N/a	—N/a
Best Peripheral of the Year	Game Genie	—N/a	—N/a
Best Movie to Game	Gremlins 2: The New Batch	—N/a	—N/a
Best Ending in a Game	Ninja Gaiden II: The Dark Sword of Chaos	—N/a	—N/a

=== Critically acclaimed titles ===
==== Famitsu Platinum Hall of Fame ====
The following video game releases in 1990 entered Famitsu magazine's "Platinum Hall of Fame" for receiving Famitsu scores of at least 35 out of 40.

Title	Platform	Score (out of 40)	Developer	Publisher	Genre
Dragon Quest IV: Michibikareshi Monotachi	Family Computer	37	Chunsoft	Enix	Role-playing
F-Zero	Super Famicom	37	Nintendo EAD	Nintendo	Racing
Final Fantasy III	Family Computer	36	Squaresoft	Squaresoft	Role-playing

==== English-language publications ====
Notable video game releases in 1990 that have accumulated overall critical acclaim from at least three contemporary English-language sources include:

Title	Genre	Publisher	Platform	Source(s)
Air Inferno	Combat flight simulator	Taito	Arcade	
Alex Kidd in Shinobi World	Hack & slash	Sega	Master System	
Aliens	Run & gun shooter	Konami	Arcade	
Alien Storm	Action	Sega	Arcade	
Buster Bros. (Pang)	Action	Mitchell	Arcade	
Castle of Illusion Starring Mickey Mouse	Platformer	Sega	Sega Mega Drive/Genesis	
G-LOC: Air Battle	Combat flight simulator	Sega	Arcade	
Golden Axe	Beat 'em up	Sega	Master System	
Golden Axe	Beat 'em up	Virgin Games	Amiga	
GP Rider	Motorbike racing	Sega	Arcade	
John Madden Football	Sports	Electronic Arts	Sega Mega Drive/Genesis	
Klax	Puzzle	Atari Games	Arcade	
Mercs	Run & gun shooter	Capcom	Arcade	
Michael Jackson's Moonwalker	Action	Sega	Arcade	
Out Zone	Run & gun shooter	Toaplan	Arcade	
Quarth (Block Hole)	Puzzle-shooter	Konami	Arcade	
Railroad Tycoon	Business simulation	MicroProse	MS-DOS	
SimCity	City-building	Maxis	Atari ST	
Smash TV	Multi-directional shooter	Williams Electronics	Arcade	
Strider	Hack & slash	Sega	Sega Mega Drive/Genesis	
Super Mario Bros. 3	Platformer	Nintendo	NES	
Super Mario World	Platformer	Nintendo	SNES	
The Secret of Monkey Island	Graphic adventure	Lucasfilm Games	MS-DOS	
Two Crude (Crude Busters)	Beat 'em up	Data East	Arcade	

== Events ==
- The Consumer Electronics Show (CES) is held at the Las Vegas Convention Center in January. NEC and Sega respectively unveil prototypes for the TurboExpress and Game Gear handheld consoles, while more than 35 titles are announced for the Game Boy. Codemasters reveals an audio CD player compatible with the NES manufactured by Samsung and to be distributed by Camerica in the summer. Camerica also reveals the "Power Pak", later known as the Game Genie. Sega announces that 20 third-party titles would be released for the Sega Genesis by the end of 1990, as well as the continued development for Master System games.
- David Pomije establishes the first FuncoLand location in New Hope, Minnesota in August.
- August – Publication of Swedish language video game magazine Nintendomagasinet begins.
- March 8 – the Nintendo World Championships begins.
- Nintendo v. Color Dreams lawsuit: Nintendo sues Color Dreams over unlicensed production of Nintendo video games.
- Toy Headquarters merges with Trinity Acquisition Corporation forming THQ.
- New companies: Eidos, Interactive Studios, Team17, Revolution Software
- Defunct: Tynesoft

== Hardware releases ==
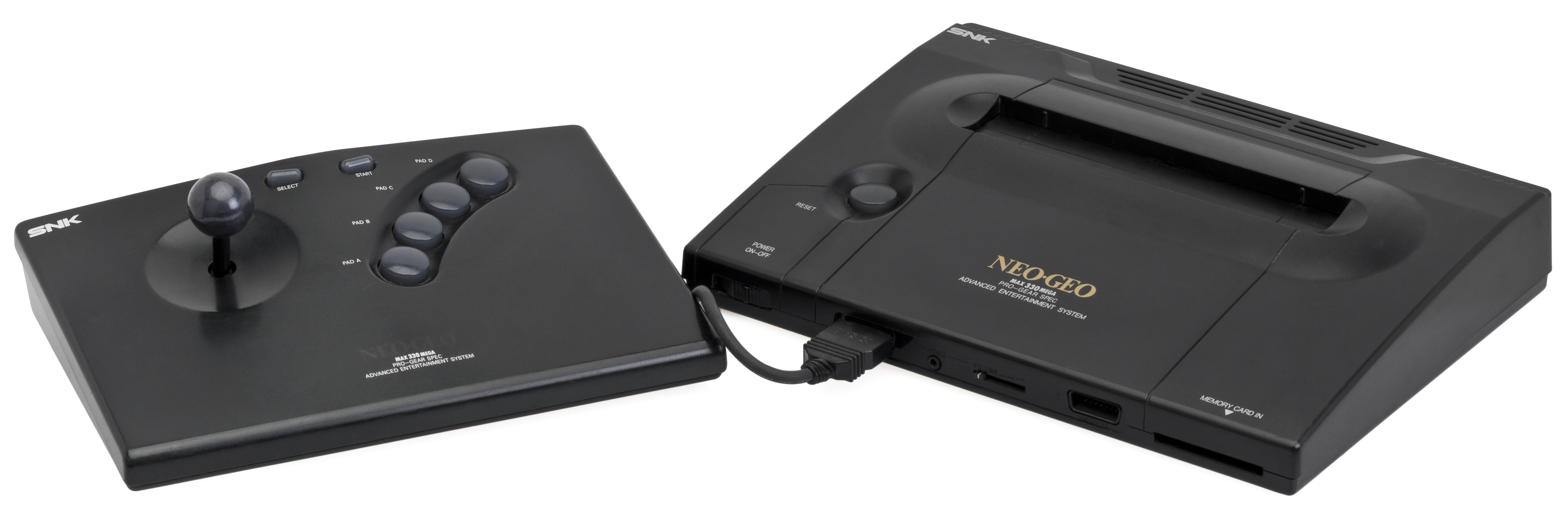
Neo Geo AES

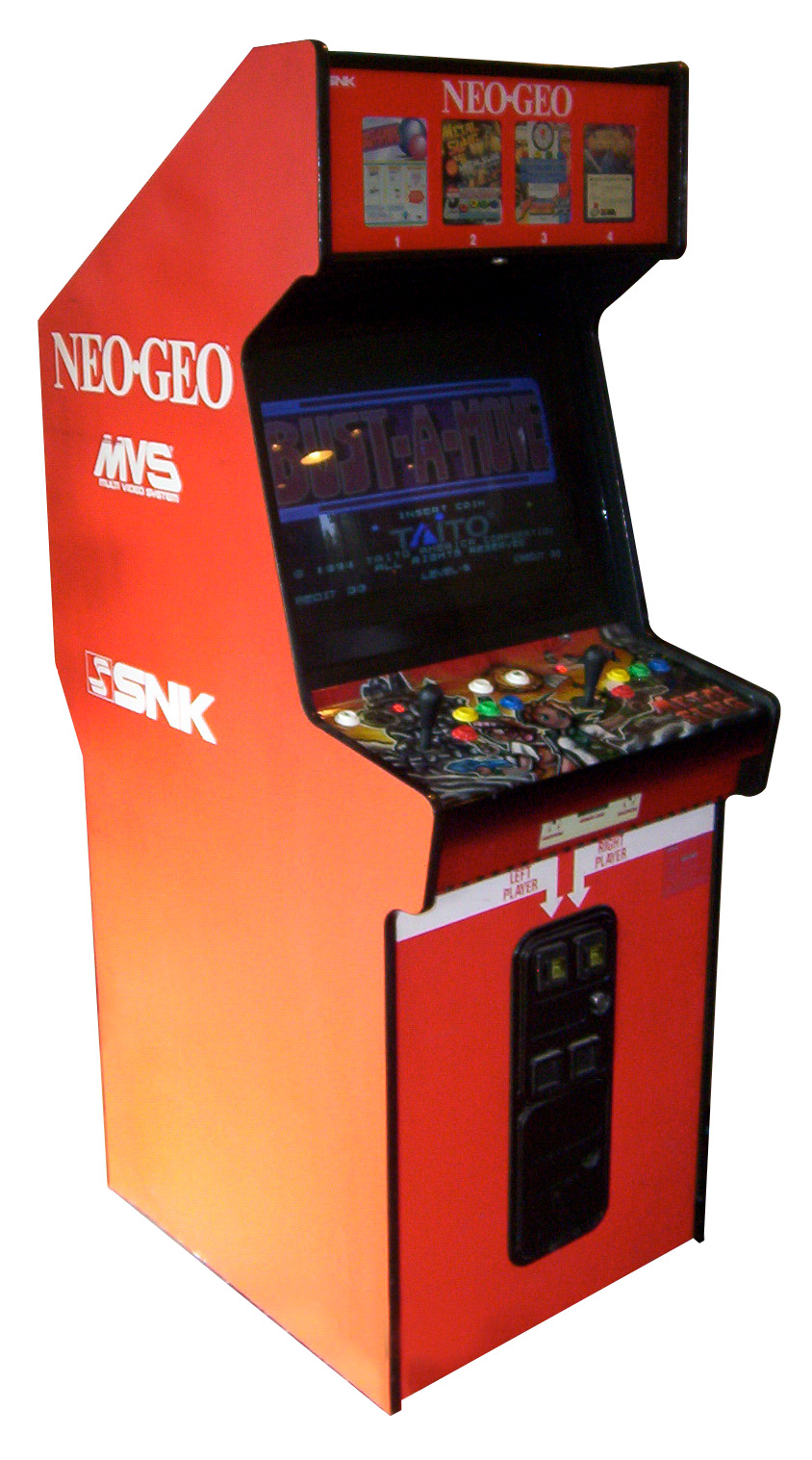
Neo Geo MVS

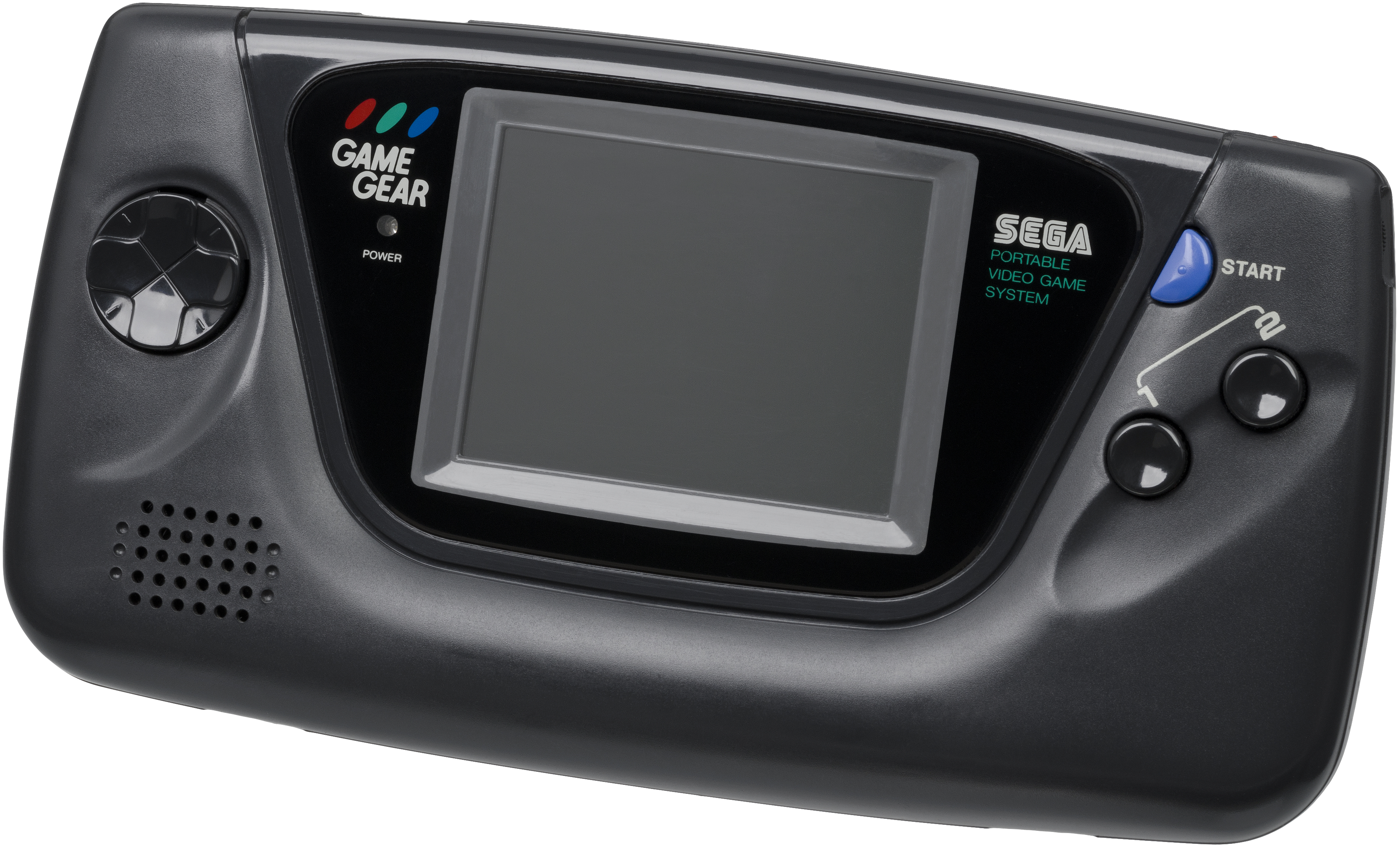
Sega Game Gear

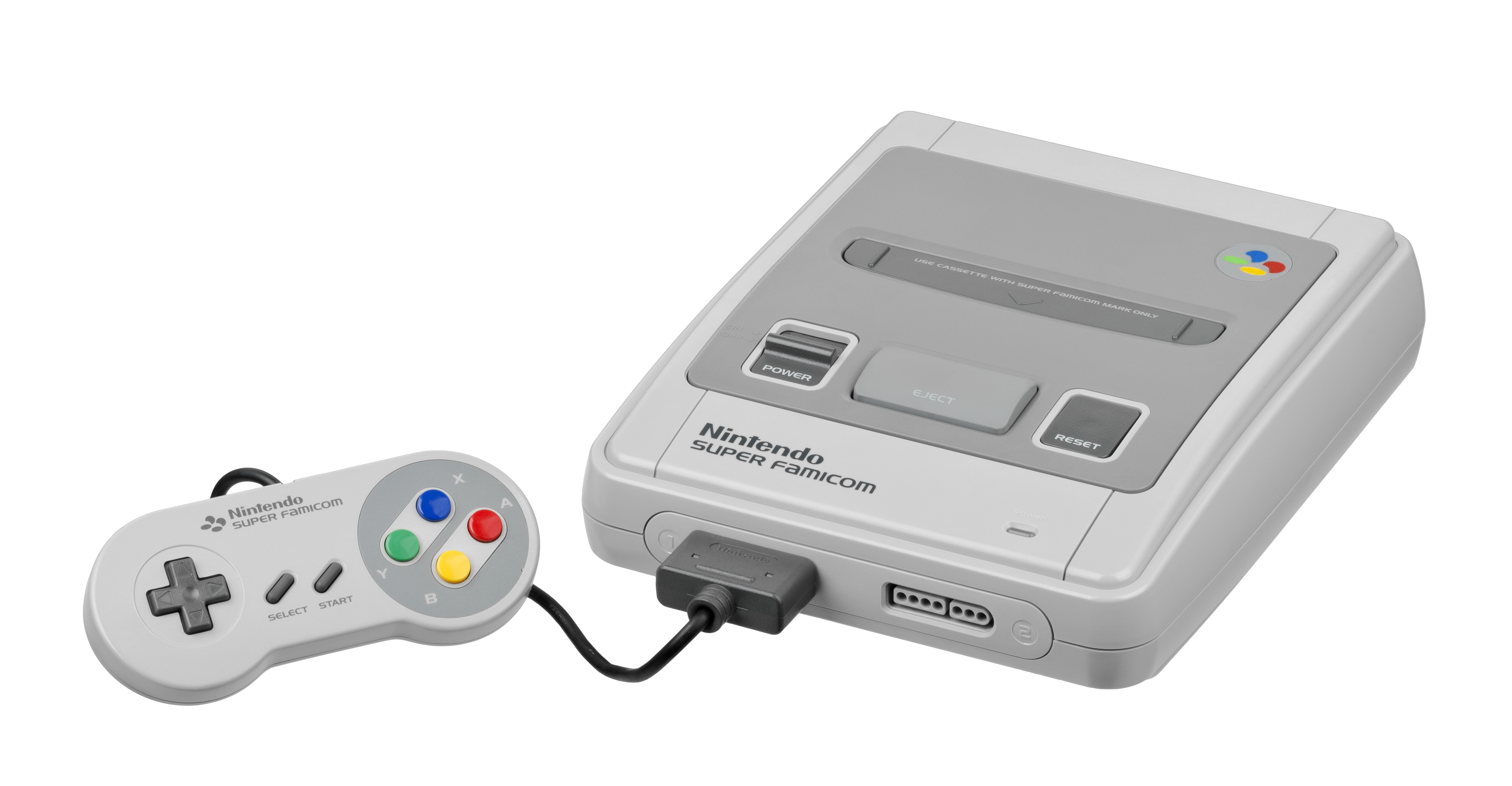
Super Famicom

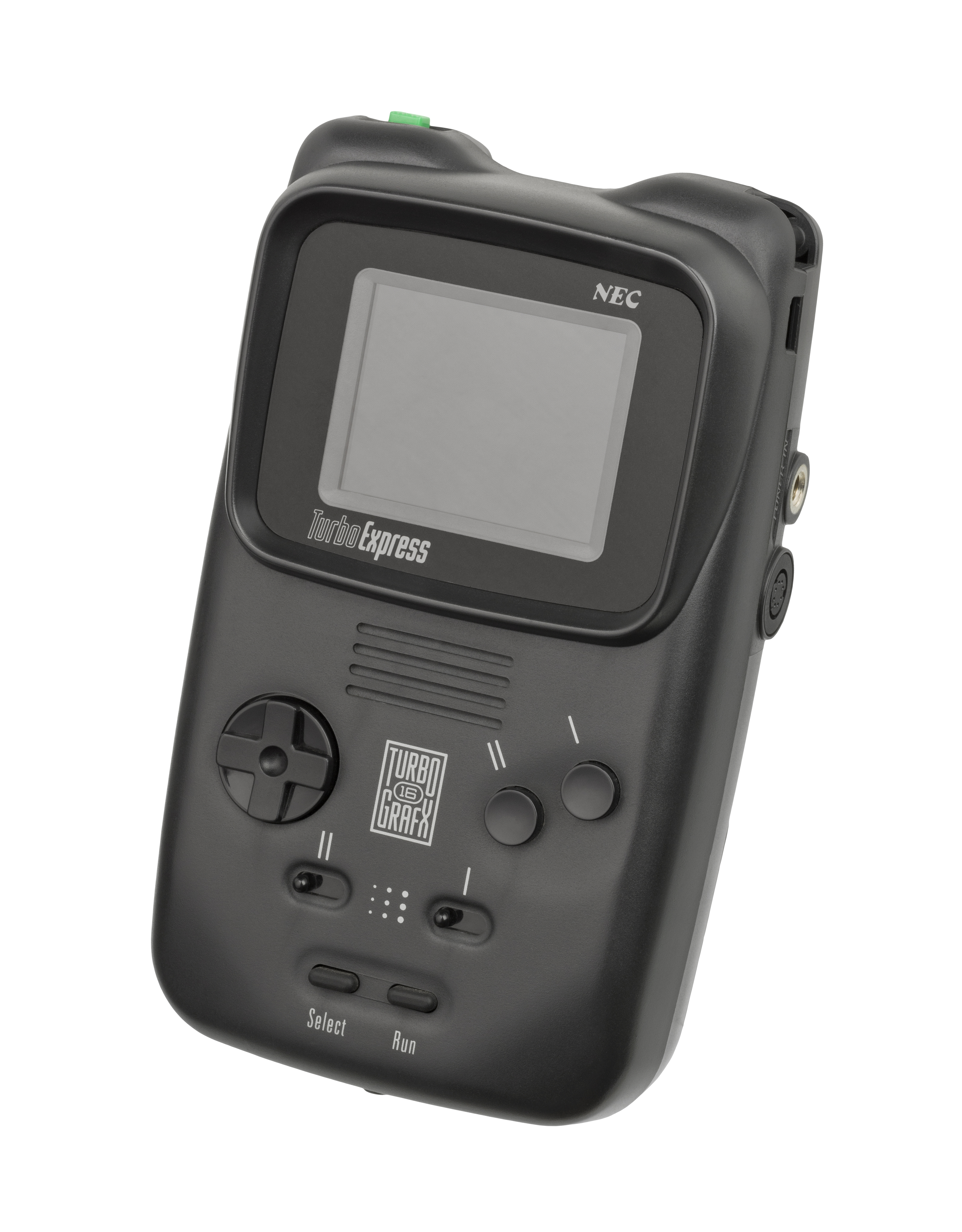
TurboExpress/PC Engine GT

- Camerica releases Codemasters' Game Genie adapter in Canada and the UK (In the US, it was released by Galoob).
- April 26 - SNK initially released the Neo Geo Advanced Entertainment System (AES) home console in Japan.
- August 22 - SNK initially released the Neo Geo Multi Video System (MVS) arcade machine in North America.
- August - The Neo Geo Multi Video System (MVS) arcade machine released in Australia & New Zealand.
- September 28 – Nintendo released the Game Boy across Europe. It became a huge success and a wide phenomenon over the continent, particularly in Germany and the UK.
- October 6 – Sega's Game Gear initially released in Japan.
- November 21 - Nintendo released the Super Famicom 16-bit console in Japan.
- November 30 – Sega's Mega Drive released in Europe.
- December 1 - NEC's PC Engine GT released in Japan.
- December - The PC Engine GT released in North America as the TurboExpress.
- Amstrad halts production of the ZX Spectrum, ending that platform's 8-year dominance of the UK home computer market.
- Amstrad introduces its only console, the GX4000, which fails to garner interest and is discontinued the following year.

== Game releases ==
- Bonk's Adventure is released for the TurboGrafx-16, the first US appearance of Bonk.
- Namco releases Kyuukai Douchuuki, World Stadium '90, Final Lap 2, Pistol Daimyo no Bouken, which is a spin-off from Berabow Man, Souko Ban Deluxe, Dragon Saber, Rolling Thunder 2, Steel Gunner and Golly! Ghost!.
- February 12 – Nintendo finally releases the NES game Super Mario Bros. 3 in North America. It sells 17.28 million copies, making it one of the best-selling video games of all time.
- April – Konami releases Snake's Revenge, a sequel to Metal Gear for the Nintendo Entertainment System in North America, developed without the involvement of Hideo Kojima.
- April – Williams releases Smash TV in arcades, a twin-stick shooter about an ultra-violent game show.
- April 20 – Nintendo releases Fire Emblem: Shadow Dragon and the Blade of Light in Japan, innovating the tactical role-playing genre.
- June 1 – Origin releases Ultima VI: The False Prophet
- July 12 – Nintendo of America publishes Final Fantasy for the Nintendo Entertainment System in North America. This game started Square's popular and long-running Final Fantasy series.
- July 20 – Metal Gear 2: Solid Snake for the MSX2 computer, is released exclusively in Japan. It is Konami's last major game for the hardware.
- July 27– Nintendo releases Dr. Mario for 3 Nintendo platforms.
- August – Pit Fighter from Atari Games introduces digitized sprites to arcade fighting games.
- September – Broderbund releases a port of Prince of Persia for MS-DOS.
- September 26 – Origin releases the first Wing Commander game.
- September 28 – Capcom releases Mega Man 3 for NES in Japan, introducing the characters Rush and Proto Man, Mega Man's slide is introduced, and Capcom's character cameos.
- November 9 – Sierra On-Line releases King's Quest V.
- October 15 – LucasArts releases The Secret of Monkey Island
- November 1 – Mega Man 3 is released in the US.
- November 21 – Nintendo releases Super Mario World and F-Zero in Japan as launch titles for the Super Famicom. Super Mario World introduced Yoshi and F-Zero introduced Captain Falcon.
- December 14 – Commander Keen is released as shareware, the first major platformer on a PC.
- Sega releases the G-LOC: Air Battle R-360 arcade game, featuring the first 3D – 360° gameplay that physically rotated the real world player.
- Sid Meier's Railroad Tycoon, the first of the "Tycoon" games, is released by MicroProse.
- Infogrames releases Alpha Waves, the first 3D platform game.
- Mindscape publishes Captive.
- Konami releases Teenage Mutant Ninja Turtles The Arcade Game, on the Nintendo Entertainment System.

== See also ==
- 1990 in games
