= Monaco Grand Prix (disambiguation) =

The Monaco Grand Prix is a Formula One motor race held on the streets of Monaco.

Monaco Grand Prix or Monaco GP can also refer to:

- The Monaco Grand Prix Formula Three support race (see List of Monaco Grand Prix Formula Three support race winners)
- Monaco GP (video game), released by Sega in 1979
- Super Monaco GP, an arcade Formula One racing simulation, released by Sega in 1990
- Ayrton Senna's Super Monaco GP II, sequel to Super Monaco GP, introduced in 1992
- Monaco Grand Prix (video game), a 1999 motor racing game for the PlayStation and Dreamcast
