= Big Run (video game) =

1989 video game

Big Run – The Supreme 4WD Challenge
- Attract mode screenshot
- Developer: Jaleco
- Publisher: Jaleco
- Platforms: Arcade, Amiga, Atari ST, SNES
- Release: NA: August 1989; JP: September 1989; EU: October 1989; HK: January 1990
- Genre: Racing
- Mode: Single-player
- Arcade system: Dedicated Jaleco hardware

Big Run (Note: Japanese: ビッグラン, Hepburn: Biggu Ran) is a rally racing arcade video game released by Jaleco in 1989. Rendered in pseudo-3D, the game is the first to be set in the Paris-Dakar rally raid which the player drives a Porsche 959, resembling that of the 1986 winner. Opponents in the game resemble Peugeot 205 T16s, which went on to win in the 1987 Paris-Dakar rally, with Mitsubishi Pajeros also appearing occasionally.

There are two games in the series: Big Run – The Supreme 4WD Challenge – 11e Rallye (1989) and Big Run – The Supreme 4WD Challenge – 13e Rallye (1991, Super Famicom)

Big Run was also converted to the Amiga and Atari ST by The Sales Curve.

== Super Famicom version ==
Jaleco Rally: Big Run: The Supreme 4WD Challenge
- Cover art
- Developer: Jaleco
- Publisher: Jaleco
- Platform: Super Famicom
- Release: JP: March 20, 1991
- Genre: Racing
- Mode: Single-player

The race proceeds in a straight line without any 360° effects to simulate about turns in the road. Most of the turns are at a 30° angle, forcing the player to turn sharply to the left or right. At the end of the game, a message reads: "Those who have tasted the waters of Africa will always long to be here", accompanied by synthesized beats. This message plays after the "game over" screen in the event of either winning or losing the game.

Driving by Tripoli, Libya

The object of the game is to travel from Tripoli, Libya, through the swamp regions of West Africa to Dakar in a rally race. Players must finish each leg of the rally before time runs out; failing to achieve this goal will result in disqualification and an immediate game over, as in the real life rally circuit. Hitting various environmental obstacles or other vehicles damages the player's vehicle. Receiving too much damage results in problems with the vehicle's components. Other challenges include difficult terrain, deserts, jungles, and darkness.

Players can choose their own navigators, corporate sponsors, auto mechanics, and automobile parts during the race of over 4,000 kilometres or 2,500 miles. Navigators help by directing players safely past areas of darkness in the race. Engine parts must be replaced by mechanics approximately every 2,500 kilometres or 1,600 miles. Racing equipment (tires, engine, brakes) must be packed up in the vehicle, creating extra weight that reduces the vehicle's top speed. The goal is to have as many replacement parts as possible while keeping the vehicle as light as possible. Emergencies do not cost money but cause the player to lose time while waiting for the repair truck. Having no parts eventually causes the vehicle to stall on the rally, also wasting the player's time.

== Reception ==
In Japan, Game Machine listed Big Run on their November 15, 1989, issue as being the second most-successful upright arcade game of the month. It went on to become Japan's fourth highest-grossing dedicated arcade game of 1990, below Super Monaco GP, Winning Run Suzuka GP and Special Criminal Investigation. In North America, it was the top-grossing new video game on the RePlay arcade charts in January 1990.

Commodore User reviewed the arcade game, giving it an 85% score.
