= 1990 in games =

This page lists board and card games, wargames, miniatures games, and tabletop role-playing games published in 1990. For video games, see 1990 in video gaming.

== Games released or invented in 1990 ==
- Ancients
- Battlelords of the 23rd Century (role-playing game)
- Careers for Girls
- Carrier
- Cyberpunk 2020 (role-playing game)
- De Bellis Antiquitatis
- Eurorails
- GURPS Cyberpunk (role-playing supplement)
- Hoity Toity
- Nightlife (role-playing game)
- Republic of Rome
- Rifts (role-playing game)
- Space Crusade
- TimeLords 2nd Edition (role-playing game)
- Torg (role-playing game)

== Game awards given in 1990 ==
- Spiel des Jahres: Adel Verpflichtet (English name Hoity Toity)
- Deutscher Spiele Preis: Adel Verpflichtet

== Significant game-related events in 1990 ==
- GMT Games was founded.
- Wizards of the Coast was founded in Renton, Washington by Peter Adkison.

== Deaths ==
Date	Name	Age	Notability
February	Władysław Gliński		Game designer of Hexagonal Chess (1936)
May 22	Pat Reid	79	Author who designed Escape from Colditz
October 31	Roger Price	72	Co-developer of Mad Libs

== See also ==
- 1990 in video gaming
