= Tommy Lasorda Baseball =

1989 video game

- North American Genesis box art
- Developer: Sega
- Publisher: Sega
- Designer: Naoto Ohshima
- Programmer: Keiichi Yamamoto
- Series: Super League
- Platforms: Sega Genesis, Arcade
- Release: Genesis: JP: April 22, 1989; NA: August 1989; EU: 1990; Arcade: EU: April 1989
- Genre: Sports (baseball)
- Modes: Single-player, multiplayer
- Arcade system: Sega Mega-Tech

Tommy Lasorda Baseball (Note: Also known as Super League (Japanese: スーパーリーグ, Hepburn: Sūpā Rīgu) in Japan and Europe.) is a 1989 baseball video game developed and published by Sega as one of the six launch titles for the Sega Genesis in North America and for the Sega Mega-Tech arcade system. It is a follow-up to the arcade game Super League (1987). It prominently features former MLB player Tommy Lasorda, who was manager of the Los Angeles Dodgers at the time. In the game, players compete with either AI-controlled opponents or against other players across single exhibitions, open matches, or a 30-game season.

Tommy Lasorda Baseball was part of a marketing campaign to build a library of titles using recognizable names and likenesses of celebrities and athletes to emphasize the arcade experience available on Sega Genesis. The game garnered mixed to positive reception from critics since its release; praise was given to the addition of season play, use of multiple perspectives, sound, two-player component, and gameplay, but criticism was geared towards this aspect being luck-based and having difficult AI, while others felt mixed in regards to the graphical quality and recommended similar titles instead.

== Gameplay ==
Genesis version screenshot

Tommy Lasorda Baseball is a baseball game where players compete in matches against AI-controlled opponents or other players in single exhibitions, open matches, or a 30-game season. A password system enables players to take their team through a season in the World Series and keeps track of other teams in the league. The 26 teams featured in the game use their real-life city names, though statistics and player names are fictional.

Although it follows the same gameplay as other baseball titles at the time and most of the rules are also present, the game opts for a more arcade-styled approach of the sport instead of being full simulation. During gameplay, players must hit a pitch, reach any base safely, pitch a strike, get the AI players out, or retire the AI's side to end an inning. The game ends when a team has scored more runs than the other at any time.

Outside of gameplay, players must manage the abilities of batters and pitchers. Batters are rated based on batting average, home runs, running speed, fielding, and throwing. Pitchers are rated based on earned run average (ERA), stamina, curve-throwing ability, top throwing speed, and the distance a hit pitch will travel. A pre-game difficulty setting makes the game biased either towards the pitcher, batter, or an equal game of skill between pitcher and batter. Players can also decide if there will be fielding errors or how environmental hazards such as wind will affect the ball.

== Release ==
Tommy Lasorda Baseball was first published in Japan by Sega on April 22, 1989, for the Mega Drive under the title Super League and later that year in North America in August as one of the six launch titles for the Genesis. It was also released in Europe under its original title. Sega signed former MLB player Tommy Lasorda, who was manager of the Los Angeles Dodgers at the time, to endorse the game as part of a marketing campaign to build a library of titles using recognizable names and likenesses of celebrities and athletes emphasizing the arcade experience available on the Genesis. An arcade version using the Sega Mega-Tech system was also released in April 1989. The original Japanese release features teams that bear resemblance to the 1989 NPB roster. The Genesis version was later re-released as a budget title in 1992 as part of the "Sega Classic" line.

== Reception ==
Reception

Review scores
Publication	Score
Aktueller Software Markt	8/12
Computer and Video Games	86%
Electronic Gaming Monthly	30/40
Famitsu	24/40
Joystick	70%
Raze	81%
Tilt	13/20
Mega Drive Advanced Gaming	48%
Play Time	74%
Score	71%
Sega Power	65%
Sega Pro	86%

Award
Publication	Award
Electronic Gaming Monthly (1989)	Best Sports-Themed Video Game (Genesis)

Tommy Lasorda Baseball garnered mixed to positive reception from critics since its release, but was tied with World Class Baseball and Baseball Simulator 1.000 for Electronic Gaming Monthly's "Best Sports-Themed Video Game" award in 1989. The public response in Japan however was mixed; while readers of Mega Drive Fan voted to give the game a 22.0 out of 30 score in a poll, readers of the Japanese Sega Saturn Magazine voted to give the title a 6.1858 out of 10 score in another poll, ranking at the number 4 and 380 spots respectively, indicating a popular, but middling following.

Electronic Gaming Monthly's reviewers praised the realistic-looking graphics, sound, gameplay and addition of season play and password, but others found Tommy Lasorda Baseball to be a standard baseball game similar to others on the market. Aktueller Software Markt's Torsten Blum gave the game a mixed outlook, noting the difficult AI and stating both visual design and sprite animations ranged from mediocre to good, but commended its realism and sound. Joystick's Jean-Marc Demoly gave positive remarks to the title's graphics, animations, sound and realism. Tilt's Alain Huyghues-Lacour noted the game may turn off novice players due to its difficulty, but commented that the graphical quality is stimulating. Sega Power's Andy Smith and Steve Jarratt regarded it as a decent rendition of the sport, praising the use of multiple perspectives, music, number of leagues, two-player mode and smooth gameplay, but criticized said gameplay for being luck-based, as well as the lack of visual variety and crowd noise, recommending HardBall! instead. Likewise, Computer and Video Games' Julian Rignall and Robert Swan noted the AI was tough, but felt that the game had a more arcade-style approach of baseball.

Raze's Les Ellis praised the character animations, detailed graphics, music, voice samples and addictive two-player mode. Sega Pro regarded it as one of the best baseball games on the Mega Drive, commending features such as full control of both batters and pitchers. Play Time's Oliver Menne felt that the title's visuals left little to be desired and criticized the character animations, but was fascinated by the clear voice samples and commended its gameplay, recommending it to baseball fans and people interested in the sport. Mega Drive Advanced Gaming stated that Super League was an adequate and reasonable baseball simulator, but not as good as R.B.I. Baseball 4. Jiří Frkal of Czech magazine Score gave positive remarks to the graphics and smooth character animations, while commenting that both music and sound complemented its atmosphere.
