= Lightning Fighters =

1990 video game

Trigon
- North American arcade flyer
- Developer: Konami
- Publisher: Konami
- Platform: Arcade
- Release: JP: May 1990; NA: June 1990
- Genre: Scrolling shooter
- Modes: Single-player, multiplayer

Lightning Fighters, released in Japan as Trigon (Note: Japanese: トライゴン, Hepburn: Toraigon), is a 1990 vertical-scrolling shooter video game developed and published by Konami for arcades. It was released in Japan in May 1990 and North America in June 1990.

== Gameplay ==
The player controls the titular spaceship and another spaceship named Super Fighters as they defeat alien enemies while traversing levels. They can collect various power-ups to improve their firepower, including a laser saber and a flaming dragon-shaped projectile, while also avoiding enemy projectiles. One particular power-up is exclusive to the two-player mode, where both spaceships utilize a powerful weapon to defeat large swarms of enemies as long as both stay alive while it is used. A checkpoint system is implemented in the Japanese version after the player loses a live, while the international version allows players to resurrect on the spot.

== Reception ==
In Japan, Game Machine listed Trigon on their June 15, 1990 issue as being the fifth most popular table arcade unit at the time.

== Legacy ==
Gradius Gaiden features a boss modeled after the ship and weapons from the game, and Yu-Gi-Oh! cards such as "Trigon", "Delta Tri" (based on the mentioned Gradius Gaiden boss), and "Dragon Laser" also represent the game. It runs the same hardware as the Teenage Mutant Ninja Turtles: Turtles in Time.

Hamster Corporation released the game as part of their Arcade Archives series for the Nintendo Switch and PlayStation 4 in August 2020, serving as the game's first re-release outside Japan.
