= Aliens (1990 video game) =

1990 video game

- Arcade flyer
- Developer: Konami
- Publisher: Konami
- Director: Satoru Okamoto
- Producer: Koji Hiroshita
- Programmers: Hirotaka Ishikawa; K. Ozaki
- Artists: M. Yoshida; Kengo Nakamura
- Composer: Masanori Adachi
- Series: Alien
- Platform: Arcade
- Release: EU: January 1990; JP: February 1990; NA: March 1990
- Genre: Run and gun
- Modes: Single-player, multiplayer

Aliens (Note: Japanese: エイリアンズ, Hepburn: Eirianzu) is a 1990 run and gun video game developed and published for arcades by Konami. It is based on the 1986 film of the same title. Two players can play the game cooperatively in addition to single-player.

== Gameplay ==
Gameplay screenshot

Aliens is primarily a side-scrolling shooter in which the player must defend against various Aliens, with certain parts of the game switching to a third-person rail shooter perspective. Players can play as either Ellen Ripley or Corporal Hicks, who both begin the game with a smart gun and can upgrade to other weapons such as flamethrowers and missile or grenade launchers. The player is given several health points, one of which is lost if the player is attacked by an Alien. The player loses a life if all the health points are lost, and the game ends if all the player's lives are depleted. Boss enemies are encountered at the end of each level, with the final boss being the Alien Queen, which the player fights with a power exoskeleton loader. A two-player mode is also available. The enemies range from standard ones seen in the films to specialized ones created exclusively for this game. When fighting the Alien Queen, two victorious outcomes are possible. In the first, the player simply opens the airlock, as in the 1986 film. If the player chooses, they can fight the Queen further, wearing her down until she bursts apart.

== Release ==
The arcade game made its worldwide debut at the Amusement Trades Exhibition International (ATEI) in London, United Kingdom. In Japan, it was exhibited at AOU in February 1990, and then received a wide release in March 1990. It made its North American debut at Chicago's American Coin Machine Exposition (ACME) the same month.

== Reception ==
Reception

Review scores
Publication	Score
AllGame	3.5/5
Crash	Positive
Computer and Video Games	91%
Zzap!64	Positive
CU Amiga	44%
Power Play	Positive

In North America, Alien was declared the best new conversion kit at the ACME show by RePlay magazine and several distributors. It went on to win a Silver award from the American Amusement Machine Association (AAMA) for sales achievement in 1990, making it Konami's second best-selling arcade game that year after Teenage Mutant Ninja Turtles. In Japan, Game Machine listed Aliens on their April 15, 1990 issue as being the second most-successful table arcade unit of the month.

Upon release in arcades, Aliens was met with mostly positive reception from reviewers. Upon release, Julian Rignall of Computer and Video Games gave Aliens an overall score of 91%, noting its "simply brilliant" graphics and describing it as "one of the goriest coin-ops since Splatterhouse." Robin Hogg of Zzap!64 gave it a positive outlook. Both Martin Gaksch and Heinrich Lenhardt of German magazine Power Play also gave Aliens a positive outlook. Crash's Mark Caswell praised the visuals. CU Amiga gave Aliens a 44% rating and criticized its "uniformly bland and drab" graphics, its "irritatingly unresponsive" controls, and its "dull" action. Brett Alan Weiss of AllGame gave Aliens three and a half stars, calling it an "enjoyably fast-paced" and "graphically creepy, smoothly animated game".

More than a decade and a half later, Retro Gamer editor-in-chief Darran Jones praised it as a "superb" game. In a more reserved opinion, Stephen Kleckner of VentureBeat included Aliens in his list of "must-play" Alien franchise games, but wrote it "is competent and entertaining for a quarter sucker, but it lacks the creative push in gameplay found in other entries on this list." Den of Geek's Ryan Lambie described it as "one of the best Alien games ever."

== See also ==
- Alien vs. Predator (arcade game)
- Alien Breed
