= Apache 3 =

1988 video game

- Developer(s): Tatsumi
- Publisher(s): Tatsumi (JP); Data East (NA)
- Platform(s): Arcade
- Release: 1988
- Genre(s): Shoot 'em up
- Mode(s): Single-player

Apache 3 is a 3D scrolling shoot 'em up arcade video game released by Tatsumi (and Data East in North America) in 1988. Players control a yellow AH-64 Apache helicopter with weapons and shoot everything in the air and on the ground.
