= Ayrton Senna's Super Monaco GP II =

1992 video game

- European cover art
- Developer: Sega (Note: Master System version co-developed by Arc System Works)
- Publisher: Sega
- Programmers: Takahiro Hamano; Masahiro Wakayama
- Artists: Kaki; Rieko Kodama; Kazuyoshi Tsugawa
- Composers: Tokuhiko Uwabo; Haruyo Oguro (GEN/MD); Masaru Setsumaru (MS, GG)
- Series: Monaco GP
- Platforms: Genesis; Master System; Game Gear
- Release: JP: July 17, 1992; PAL: July 1992; NA: September 1992
- Genre: Racing
- Mode: Single-player

Ayrton Senna's Super Monaco GP II (Note: Japanese: アイルトン セナ スーパーモナコGP II, Hepburn: Airuton Sena Sūpā Monako GP Tsū) is an arcade-style Formula One racing video game developed and manufactured by Sega for the Genesis, Master System, and Game Gear in 1992. It is a follow-up to Super Monaco GP. The game was also endorsed by, and had technical input from, the then-Formula One champion Ayrton Senna. Gameplay includes a World Championship season featuring recreations of the tracks in the 1991 Formula One World Championship, along with a three-race "Senna GP" mode set on fictional tracks.

The game was initially suggested by Sega's distributor in Brazil, Tec Toy, but developed by Sega in Japan. The game's development was also assisted by Senna, who personally supplied his own advice about the tracks featured in the game. Reception to Ayrton Senna's Super Monaco GP II was mixed to positive, with reviewers praising the gameplay and the graphics but criticizing too few changes from Super Monaco GP.

== Gameplay ==
A typical in-game screenshot. The player is racing a car from the driver's seat, while a rear view is above, a tachometer is to the left, and a map is to the right.

Based on Formula One, Ayrton Senna's Super Monaco GP II features 19 race tracks: unnamed recreations of the tracks in the 1991 Formula One World Championship, and three fantasy tracks in the Senna GP mode. Players take control of a race car from the driver's seat view, with a rear view at the screen top. The display also includes a map, tachometer, and speedometer. Six individual save slots are included to save games.

In the game's World Championship mode, players have a choice of Beginner or Master difficulty. In addition to the difficulty of the competition, Beginner races take three laps while Master races take six. Each season takes place over sixteen races, in which the player races against fifteen computer-controlled opponents. Players can also enter their name and nationality when starting the mode. Before a race, players can choose their car's transmission: automatic, 4-speed semi-automatic, or 7-speed manual. While automatics are easier to control, manuals provide greater speed. Players must qualify before each race or else start in 12th place. Additionally, the Senna GP mode features races on three tracks, completion of which will earn the player an Ayrton Senna Super License. A Free Practice mode is also available.

== Development ==
The initial pitch for Ayrton Senna's Super Monaco GP II came from Tec Toy, Sega's distributor in Brazil. Tec Toy approached Sega with the concept of developing a game starring Brazilian F1 driver Ayrton Senna, who was the 1988, 1990, and 1991 World Champion. Sega executive vice president Shoichiro Irimajiri personally knew Senna, having previously been an executive at Honda with its F1 division, the engine provider for Senna's team at McLaren, under his oversight. As development of the game began, Senna was personally involved in providing direction for the game and ensured he saw to changes he suggested. Among Senna's suggestions was a lack of speed reduction when driving over stripes in the corners, which the first game had done. A 1996 retrospective in Brazilian magazine Ação Games reported that Senna helped correct deficiencies in the original game's circuit layouts and designed three additional tracks, including one based on the karting circuit at his farm in Tatuí, São Paulo. A visit Senna made to Sega's Japanese headquarters shortly before the 1991 Japanese Grand Prix resulted in a three and a half hour visit, with developers flocking to meet with him. Senna also recorded voice segments commenting on each of the F1 tracks in the game, except for still under construction Circuit de Catalunya, which had not opened at the time. Segments about that circuit were recorded after the Gran Premio Tío Pepe de España, which opened the circuit to major competition.

The game was announced in Japan by October 1991. Ayrton Senna's Super Monaco GP II was released on July 17, 1992 in Japan, July in PAL regions, and September in North America. For an article in their magazine, Mega Drive Advanced Gaming had F1 racing driver Johnny Herbert play the game.

== Reception ==
Reception

Review scores
Publication	Score
Beep! MegaDrive	7.25/10 (SMD)
Computer and Video Games	88% (SMD)
Game Players	7/10 (GEN)
GamePro	4/5 (GEN)
HobbyConsolas	90/100 (SMD)
Joystick	88% (SMD)
Player One	80% (SMD); 40% (SMS)
Video Games (DE)	67% (SMS)
Mean Machines	87% (SMD)
Mega Drive Fan	21.4/30 (SMD)
Power Play	70% (GG)
Sega Force	88% (SMD); 94% (SMS)
Sega Power	53% (SMS)

Award
Publication	Award
MegaTech (1991)	Hyper Game Award

GamePro praised the speed of the Genesis version and highlighted its improvements in graphics and sound over Super Monaco GP. Player One gave the Mega Drive version a positive review, but posed that owners of the first game would have difficulty understanding why to purchase the sequel. Two reviewers for Mean Machines praised the game as being one of the best racing games on the console but as too similar to Super Monaco GP; the same sentiment was echoed by Tim Boone of Computer and Video Games. Vince Matthews of Game Players was critical of the lack of improvements compared to the original game, focused mainly on control pad issues. In reviewing the game for Hobby Consolas, Giancarlo Vialli gave high praise for the game's improvements over the original, but found the lack of setup adjustments that were present in the first game as a negative. Mega placed the game at #5 in their "Top Mega Drive Games of All Time".

In reviewing the Master System version, German magazine VideoGames gave praise to the game's controls while also critical of the lack of perception of speed. Reviews for Player One and Sega Power shared the same criticism of the Master System version. British magazine Sega Force awarded the Master System version 94%, higher than its 88% score for the Mega Drive version, describing the former as an improvement over the original Super Monaco GP. For the Game Gear version, German magazine Power Play praised the improvement of the graphics over the first game. In 2017, GamesRadar+ ranked the game 25th in their "Best Sega Genesis/Mega Drive games of all time".

In 1994, an article in Computer and Video Games called the game "easily the biggest selling driving game for the Mega Drive". In Brazil, the game was the Tectoy's seventh-best-selling Mega Drive game.

== See also ==
- Virtua Racing
- Monaco GP (video game)
- Monaco Grand Prix
