= Carrier (board game) =

Carrier is a solitaire wargame published in 1990 by Victory Games, a subsidiary of Avalon Hill.

== Description ==
Carrier, designed by Jon Southard, uses a single-player rules system to simulate the World War II conflict in the Solomon Islands between Allied and Japanese naval forces. Several scenarios are included that simulate the Battle of the Coral Sea, the Battle of the Eastern Solomons, and the Battle of the Santa Cruz Islands. Several other non-historical "what if" scenarios are also offered.

The player is in command of the Allied Task Force fighting to defeat the Japanese Navy. Depending on the scenario played, the player's forces can be entirely American, or mostly American with some British Commonwealth elements. The solitaire rules attempt to recreate the incomplete knowledge that admirals had about the exact location of the opposing forces, and subsequent decisions that were taken with inexact or faulty intelligence.

In 1992, a new scenario by Alan Arvold, The Battle of Rennell Island, was published in The General.

== Reception ==
In Issue 73 of Fire & Movement, Jeff Petraska found the game to be challenging and suspenseful as he tried to find the Japanese fleet and then decide what forces to commit to battle, but he thought that the game relied too much on luck rather than skill.

== Reviews ==
- Strategy Plus
- Casus Belli #63
