= Winning Run =

1988 video game

- Japanese arcade flyer
- Developer: Namco
- Publisher: Namco
- Composer: Hiroyuki Kawada
- Series: Winning Run
- Platform: Arcade
- Release: JP: December 1988; EU: January 1989; NA: September 1989
- Genre: Racing simulation
- Modes: Single-player, multiplayer
- Arcade system: Namco System 21

Winning Run (Note: Japanese: ウィニングラン, Hepburn: U~iningu Ran) is a first-person arcade racing simulation game developed and published by Namco in December 1988 in Japan, before releasing internationally the following year. The player pilots a Formula One racer, with the objective being to complete each race in first place, while avoiding opponents and other obstacles, such as flood-hit tunnels, pits and steep chambers. It was the first game to run on the Namco System 21 arcade hardware, capable of 3D shaded polygons.

Development of the game began in 1985, taking three years to complete. Upon release, Winning Run was a major commercial success in Japan and a fairly moderate success in the West. The game received a favorable critical reception, with many complimenting its impressive 3D graphics for the time, alongside its Formula One racing realism. It was considered a milestone in 3D polygonal graphics technology, being able to draw 60,000 individual polygons per second. Winning Run would go on to receive numerous awards from gaming publications, and be followed up by two arcade sequels; Winning Run Suzuka GP (1989) and Winning Run '91 (1991). A similar arcade game, Driver's Eyes, was released in 1990.

== Gameplay ==
Gameplay screenshot

Winning Run is a first-person Formula One simulation racing video game. The player controls a Formula One racer, with the objective being to make it to the end of each race while in first place. Two gameplay modes are present: Easy and Technical, both of which affect the speed of the player's car. A "qualifying lap" will need to be completed first in order to begin the final race, which will pit the player against twelve opponents. Common obstacles include pits, flood-hit tunnels and steep cambers.

The game is housed in an "environmental" arcade cabinet, capable of twisting and moving according to the player's direction input. Unlike previous cabinets of its type, that commonly used hydraulics, Winning Run instead used a series of electric rams and runners to make the machine move, which has been cited as giving off a more realistic sense of driving. A steering wheel is provided for input, which is a staple for racing arcade games.

== Development and release ==
Development of Winning Run officially began in 1985. It was being developed for the Namco System 21 arcade board, later nicknamed "Polygonizer", that allowed for 3D shaded graphics and the ability to draw a total of 60,000 individual polygons per second, which was considered a milestone for its time; Winning Run would become the first game to use the hardware. Music for the game was composed by Hiroyuki Kawada, who previously composed the original score for Galaga '88. It was officially released in Japan in December 1988 and later in Europe in January 1989, where it was presented at the Amusement Trades Exhibition International trade show in London. In North America, it was released in September 1989.

== Reception ==
Reception

Review scores
| Publication | Score |
|---|---|
| ACE | 5/5 |
| Computer and Video Games | Positive |
| Commodore User | Positive |
| The Games Machine | Positive |

Awards
| Publication | Award |
|---|---|
| Gamest Awards | Special Award; Best Graphics (nomination) |
| Computer and Video Games | Top Arcade Games of 1989 (#3) |
| Your Sinclair | Top of the Slots '89 (#5) |

=== Commercial performance ===
In Japan, Game Machine listed it on their March 1, 1989 issue as being the most-successful upright arcade cabinet of the month. Famitsu placed the game at the top of their arcade earnings chart for August 1989. In September, it dropped to number two, with Sega's racer Super Monaco GP placing at the top. In October 1989, it dropped to the third spot, just under Super Monaco GP and Sega's arcade version of Tetris. Winning Run ended the year as the second highest-grossing arcade game of 1989 in Japan, just below Sega's Tetris. The September 1989 issue of Commodore User said the game was "flooding" arcade centers across Europe. In North America, Winning Run was successful in early 1990, topping the RePlay arcade earnings chart for new video games in March 1990.

=== Critical response ===
Winning Run received critical acclaim from gaming publications, with critics applauding its realism and 3D graphics, considered revolutionary for its time. In the March 1989 issue of Computer and Video Games, Clare Edgeley and Julian Rignall gave it a positive review, favorably comparing it to Atari's Hard Drivin'. They labeled Winning Run's graphics as "simply stunning", concluding that it is "easily the best racing game yet seen – it's thoroughly realistic and totally exhilarating". The Games Machine was also positive in their review, calling it one of the most impressive arcade games of the era, referring to it as "an astonishing coin-op". Praise was also given to its sense of realism to Formula One racing.

The September 1989 issue of Commodore User labelled its gameplay and graphics as "literally breathtaking". Much like Computer and Video Games, it was positively compared to Hard Drivin. Advanced Computer Entertainment labeled it as superior to Hard Drivin', stating that it usurps the title's graphics and gameplay, and concluding it was one of the best racing arcade games on the market. The March 1990 issue of Your Sinclair applauded the game's technical capabilities, but said it was not as fun as Atari's game, stating the lack of a stunt course had "diminished the appeal somewhat".

=== Accolades ===
At the 1989 Gamest Awards in Japan, Winning Run received a Special Award, and was nominated for "Best Graphics", but lost to Taito's shooter Darius II. Computer and Video Games listed it as one of the top three best arcade games of 1989. The March 1990 issue of Your Sinclair listed it as one of the top five best arcade games of 1989.

== Legacy ==
The success of Winning Run led to two follow-up games. Winning Run Suzuka GP was released in 1989 exclusively in Japan. As its title suggests, this game is centered around the Suzuka Circuit. This game instead used a sit-down cabinet as opposed to the one used in the original Winning Run, bearing a resemblance to the ones used for Namco's own Final Lap three years prior. Suzuka GP became Japan's second highest-grossing dedicated arcade game of 1990, below Super Monaco GP.

The second, Winning Run '91, was released in 1991, again exclusive to Japan, using the same arcade cabinet the original game had. A similar 3D racing game, Driver's Eyes, was released for Japan in 1990. Using a newly built arcade cabinet, it used a set of three panoramic monitors to give a more open view in the game. The soundtrack for the game was released by Victor Entertainment on July 21, 1989, compiling it with music from Splatterhouse and Metal Hawk.
