= Big Event Golf =

1986 video game

- Arcade flyer
- Developer: Taito
- Publisher: Taito
- Platform: Arcade
- Release: NA: 1986
- Genre: Sports
- Modes: Single-player, multiplayer

Big Event Golf is a golf arcade video game released by Taito in 1986. The player is a participant on an 18-hole championship golf course. The objective is to acquire the lowest score possible. The rules used in this game are the same as in actual golf.

== Reception ==
In Japan, Game Machine listed Big Event Golf on their April 15, 1986 issue as being the third most-successful table arcade unit of the month.
