= Monaco GP (video game) =

1979 video game

- North American arcade flyer
- Developer: Sega
- Publishers: JP: Sega; WW: Sega/Gremlin
- Platforms: Arcade, SG-1000
- Release: Monaco GP Arcade: JP: November 1979; US: November 1979; WW: January 1980; Pro Monaco GP Arcade: JP: March 1980; WW: July 1980; SG-1000: JP: December 1983; PAL: 1984
- Genre: Racing
- Mode: Single-player
- Arcade system: TTL-based

Monaco GP (Note: Japanese: モナコGP, Hepburn: Monako GP) is an arcade racing game released by Sega in November 1979 in Japan and the United States, and January 1980 worldwide. An upgraded version, Pro Monaco GP, was released later in 1980. One of the last Sega games to use TTL chips instead of a microprocessor CPU, the game has players race against a clock and pass rival racers while attempting to earn points driving through five areas.

The game was commercially successful in arcades. In Japan, it was among the top three highest-grossing games of 1979 and top five in 1980, while in the United States it was the top-grossing driving game of 1981. It continued to regularly appear on Japanese arcade charts through 1983, and made a record number of appearances on US arcade charts from 1980 through 1987. Monaco GP was ported to the SG-1000 in 1983. The series also had later releases Super Monaco GP and Ayrton Senna's Super Monaco GP II.

== Gameplay ==
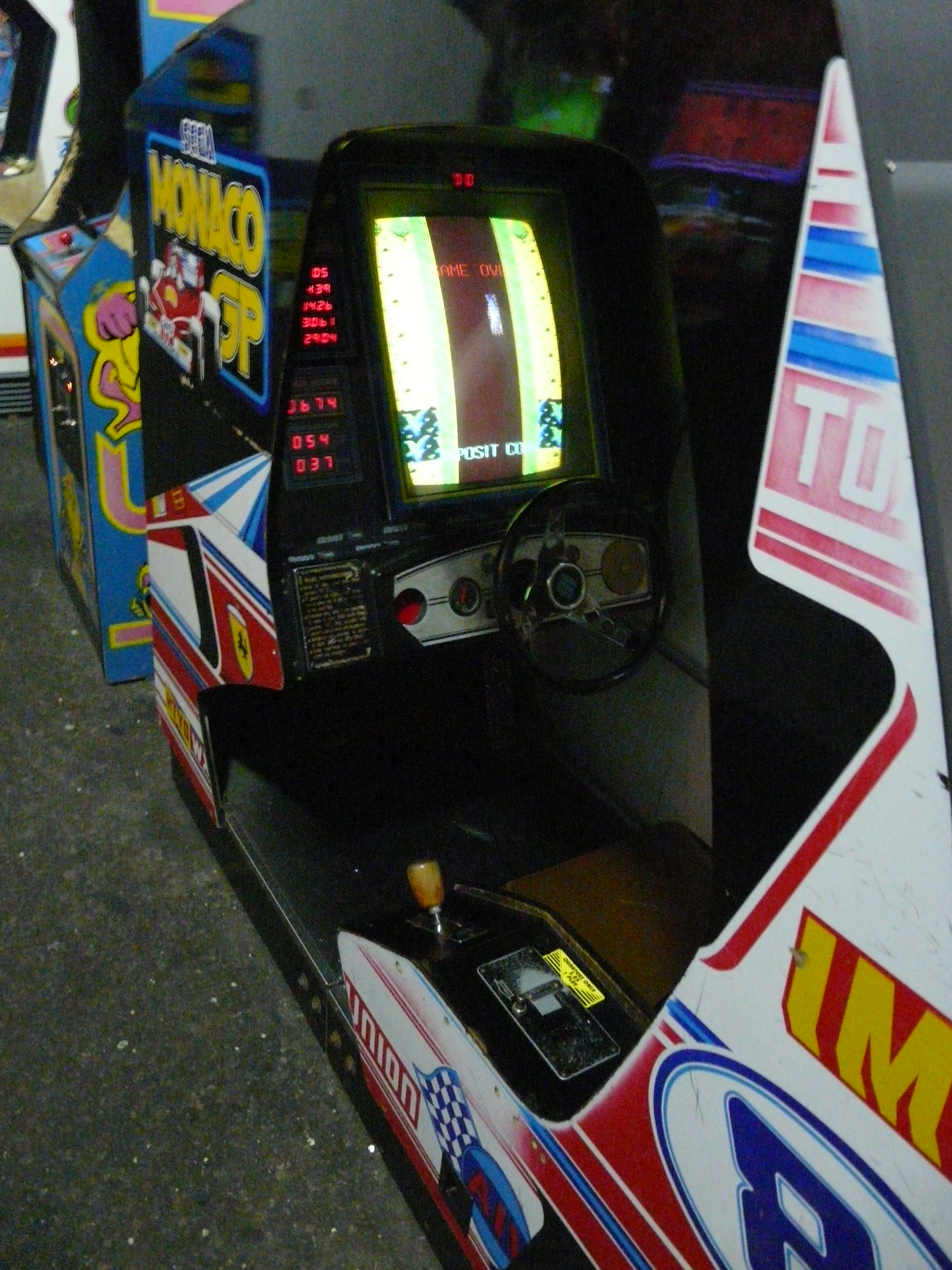
The deluxe cockpit cabinet of Monaco GP. Inside, a stick shift is on the left, and a steering wheel and pedal are underneath the monitor.

Monaco GP is a racing game played from an overhead perspective, where the main objective is to finish a course before time runs out. Points are awarded as the player races through five areas. As the game progresses, rival cars controlled by the game's artificial intelligence get faster, the road narrows, and the road surface changes to ice and gravel. Various hazards in the road include puddles, narrow bridges, and tunnels where the driver's view is limited by the range of the car's headlights on screen. The timer continues counting down until 2000 points are scored; then, the system changes to a limited number of lives. At 6000 points and again at 8000, rival cars increase in speed. According to Sega Arcade History, the concept for this timer system came from Sega Enterprises president Hayao Nakayama. Pro Monaco GP, an upgraded version of the game released later, features a higher difficulty level than the original game.

== Development and release ==
Monaco GP was one of the last arcade games made by Sega to use transistor–transistor logic (TTL) based discrete logic circuits instead of a microprocessor-based central processing unit (CPU). The game is operated by over 100 chips across two circuit boards. Images are stored in small custom read-only memory (ROM) chips, including sprites, cars, and the "game over" message. Sound effects, such as the cars' engines, a siren, and the sound of wheels slipping on the pavement, are generated by operational amplifiers and other analog circuitry. The scoring information appears on various LEDs located on the cabinet, including the player's score and the high score table. Pro Monaco GP also features a battery backup system to save high scores if the cabinet loses power.

Multiple styles of arcade cabinet exist for the game, including a deluxe cockpit cabinet which was designed in approximation to sitting behind the wheel of a race car with a padded steering wheel and accelerator pedal. A tabletop housing and a smaller upright cabinet were also created.

Initially displayed at the Japan Amusement Association show in Tokyo in 1979, Monaco GP received a positive reception at its debut. Sega chairman David Rosen called the game's warm reception at the show evidence of the world's growing acceptance of coin-operated arcade games. Monaco GP was released in November 1979 in Japan and the United States, followed by the rest of the world in January 1980 via Sega/Gremlin. Pro Monaco GP, an upgraded version with a higher difficulty level, was released in Japan in March 1980, and worldwide in July of the same year. The original game was later ported to the SG-1000 and SC-3000, Sega's first video game consoles. The SG-1000 port was released in December 1983 in Japan, and by March 1984 in Europe.

== Reception ==
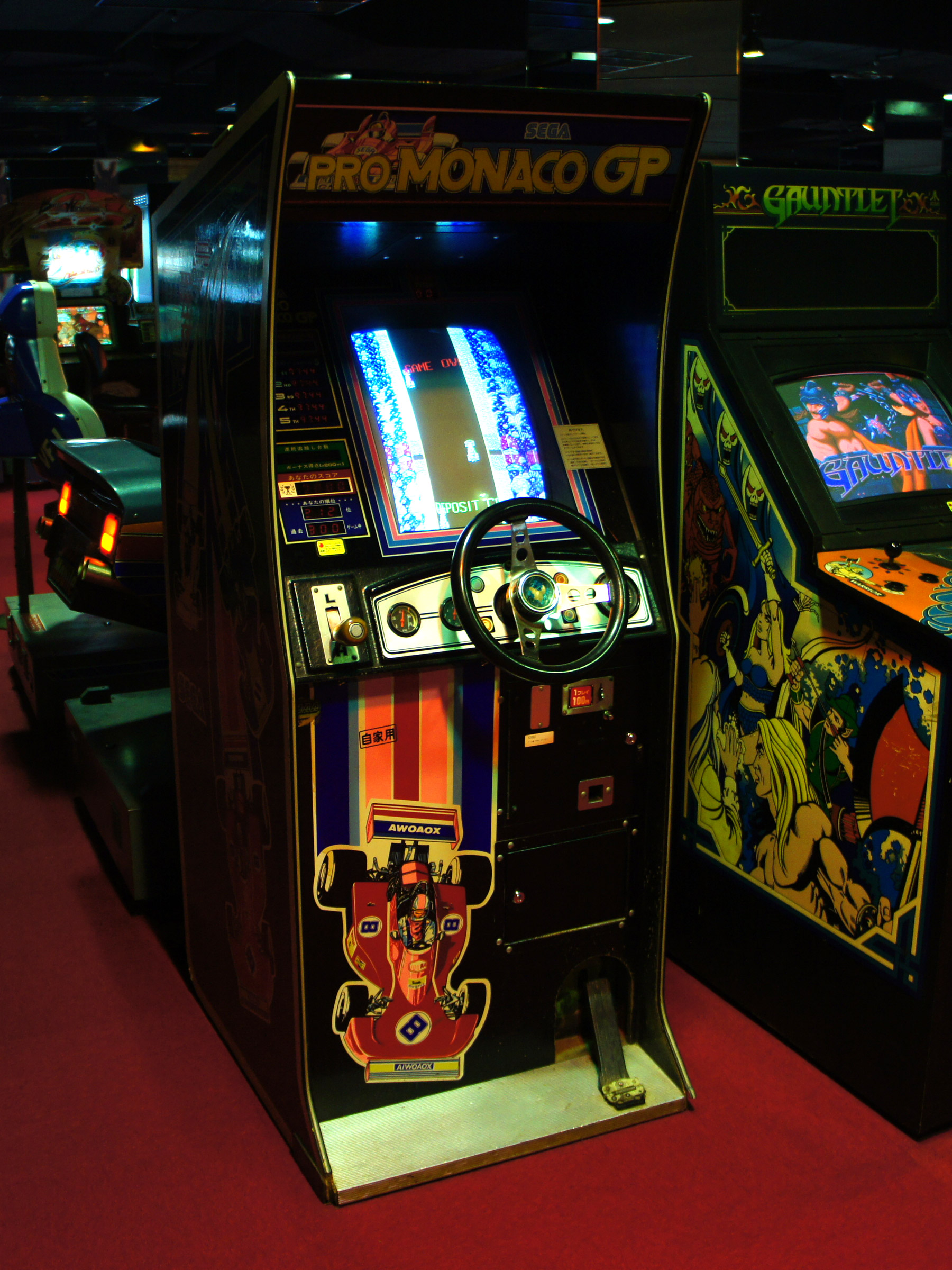
A Pro Monaco GP upright arcade cabinet, with a steering wheel for control and accelerator pedal at the bottom

Monaco GP became highly successful in arcades. In Japan, it was the third highest-grossing arcade game of 1979, then the fifth highest-grossing arcade game of 1980, and then the 20th highest-grossing arcade video game of 1982. Japanese magazine Game Machine later listed Monaco GP on their July 15, 1983 issue as being the fifth top-grossing upright/cockpit arcade cabinet of the month in Japan. In North America, Cashbox reported that Monaco GP was the most popular arcade driving game in the US in 1981, and it was among the highest-grossing games of the year. The game appeared on the monthly arcade earnings charts of arcade industry magazine RePlay from April 1980 until April 1987, a record number of appearances to which Namco's Galaga was the next closest to reaching. In 1985, Eddie Adlum of RePlay called Monaco GP the "most evergreen" arcade hit to emerge from 1979. French magazine Tilt gave the SC-3000 version of the game 6 of 6 stars in graphics, and 4 of 6 in gameplay.

== Legacy ==
Sega revived the Monaco GP series with Super Monaco GP in 1989, and Ayrton Senna's Super Monaco GP II in 1992. Super Monaco GP designer Hisao Oguchi had played Monaco GP before working for Sega, and when Oguchi decided to design a game based on Formula One, he started with a different name but chose Super Monaco GP after listening to opinions that the name was a good one. He referenced a parallel between the Monaco Grand Prix being the top event in racing and Sega being the top company in arcades.

In 2003, Sega made a remake of Monaco GP for the PlayStation 2, as a part of the Sega Ages 2500 collection. The remake features a number of additions including more cars and game modes. Kurt Kalata of Hardcore Gaming 101 applauded the 2500 remake in particular for its improvements to the gameplay of the original, believing it would have been worthy of a separate release outside Japan.
