= Dragon Breed =

1989 Video game

- Arcade flyer
- Developer: Irem
- Publishers: Irem; Activision (conversions)
- Platforms: Arcade, Amiga, Amstrad CPC, Atari ST, Commodore 64, ZX Spectrum
- Release: 1989
- Genre: Scrolling shooter

Dragon Breed (ドラゴンブリード, Doragon Burīdo) is a horizontally scrolling shooter video game produced by Irem and released in arcades in 1989. It runs on M72 and M81 hardware. Activision released home computer conversions in 1990.

== Gameplay ==
Gameplay screenshot

The player controls King Kayus, who rides a large dragon named Bahamoot. Bahamoot is immune to enemy attacks, capable of blocking most projectiles and damaging enemies on contact; Kayus, however, is not, but is armed with a forward-firing crossbow.

Bahamoot's body is flexible and responds to Kayus' movement, enabling Kayus to use Bahamoot as a mobile shield or as a whip-like weapon. The player can also circle the tail around a group of enemies to kill them. The tail of the yellow or blue dragon can be coiled around the player to offer almost complete invulnerability for a limited time.

Bahamoot can also spit fireballs. By holding the fire button down, the dragon will build up fire in its mouth; the longer the button is held down, the more powerful the fireball will be. There are four levels of fireball power; at its strongest, the fireball resembles a dragon's head. The game also contains some platforming elements—Kayus is able to dismount on horizontal platforms.

Power-ups comes in the form of orbs acquired by shooting small green dragons that appear intermittently throughout stages, or they can be collected from the ground on foot. There are four different types of orbs, each of will change Bahamoot to a different color and grant him a new attack power. The red orb enables the dragon to breathe a flame. Gold enables Bahamoot's body to fire crescents in all directions. Silver enables the dragon to produce up to four miniature dragons, which home in on enemies. Blue enables Bahamoot to fire downward bolts of electricity from its underside. The player can further enhance Bahamoot's powers by picking up the same type of orb up to three times.

== Plot ==
The following is transcribed from the game's promotional brochure:

Kayus became the King of the Agamen Empire when he was just 15 years old. Those who dissatisfied with his enthronement conspired to break the seal confining the King of Darkness, Zambaquous, to seize the kingdom with the black power. Thus, wind was filled with miasma and the ground rotted, gradually turning into darkness. Young King Kayus, stop the recovery of darkness together with the dragon of light, Bahamoot.

== Reception ==
Reception

Award
Publication	Award
Computer and Video Games	C+VG Hit

In Japan, Game Machine listed Dragon Breed on their August 15, 1989 issue as being the fourth most-successful table arcade unit of the month.
