= PlayMaker Football =

1989 video game

- Developer(s): PlayMaker Software
- Publisher(s): Broderbund
- Designer(s): Brian Reeves
- Platform(s): MS-DOS, Classic Mac OS, PC-98
- Release: 1989
- Genre(s): Sports, American football
- Mode(s): Single-player, multiplayer

PlayMaker Football is an American football simulation developed by PlayMaker Software and released in 1989 for the Mac by Broderbund. It was ported to Windows, PC-98, and Palm OS. PlayMaker Football 2.0 was released in 1996 for MS-DOS and Windows.

== Gameplay ==
PlayMaker Football allows one to take the role of a coach of a team of 30 football players. The coach can create a team using the Team Draft mode of the program, and then design and test plays using the Chalkboard Editor mode. The Chalkboard Editor mode also allows the coach to create artificial intelligence settings for each play, used by the program to determine which play to call on each down of a game. The Game mode allows the coach to play games between two teams, each under the control of a coach or the computer.

== Reception ==
PlayMaker Football 2.1.4 was reviewed by mymac.com in 1997. The reviewers highlighted the realism, sound effects and the community of enthusiasts that were present online.
