= World Class Baseball =

1988 video game

- Developer: Hudson Soft
- Publishers: JP: Hudson Soft; NA: NEC
- Composer: Daisuke Inoue
- Series: Power League
- Platforms: TurboGrafx-16, Virtual Console, X68000
- Release: TurboGrafx-16: JP: June 24, 1988; NA: August 29, 1989; X68000: JP: December 1988; Virtual Console: NA: September 17, 2007; EU: September 21, 2007
- Genre: Sports
- Modes: Single-player, multiplayer

World Class Baseball is a baseball video game originally released for the NEC PC Engine in 1988. It was re-released for the Wii Virtual Console service in North America on September 17, 2007, and in PAL regions on September 21, 2007.

== Gameplay ==
World Class Baseball features 12 teams that must be defeated in the single player Pennant Mode, in a knockout competition. Upon defeating all teams, the player faces off against the Turbo Tigers, a non-player selectable team of all-stars. The game also gives the option for players to compete in a one or two player versus exhibition game, or to watch two computer controlled teams play each other.

=== Teams ===
- Turbo Tigers (Hudson Bees in Japanese version)

North Division * Tokyo Ninjas * New York City Apples * L.A. Stars * Toronto Towers * Chicago Winds * London Lords	South Division * Paris Fries * Rome Togas * Moscow Bears * Peking Ducks * Bangkok Buddhas * Sydney Sharks

== Reception ==
Reception

Review scores
Publication	Score
Aktueller Software Markt	9/12
Computer and Video Games	86%, 70%
Eurogamer	7/10
GameSpot	4/10
IGN	5.5/10
Nintendo Life	6/10

Award
Publication	Award
Electronic Gaming Monthly (1989)	Best Sports-Themed Video Game (TG-16)

World Class Baseball garnered mixed reviews from critics.
