= Hard Drivin' =

1989 video game

- North American arcade flyer
- Developers: Atari Games; Ports; Tengen; Domark; Sterling Silver Software; NuFX
- Publishers: NA: Atari Games; JP: Namco
- Designer: Rick Moncrief
- Programmers: Stephanie Mott; Max Behensky
- Artists: Sam Comstock; Kris Moser; Deborah Short
- Composer: Don Diekneite
- Platforms: Arcade, Amiga, Amstrad CPC, Lynx, Atari ST, Commodore 64, MS-DOS, Genesis/Mega Drive, ZX Spectrum
- Release: February 12, 1989: Arcade; NA: February 12, 1989; EU: February 1989; JP: June 1989; HK: November 1989 Amiga, CPC, ST, C64 1989 MS-DOS, Spectrum 1990 Genesis/Mega Drive; JP: December 21, 1990; NA: 1990; EU: 1991 Lynx; WW: 1991
- Genre: Driving simulation
- Mode: 2 players (alternating)
- Arcade system: Atari Hard Drivin'

Hard Drivin' is a sim racing arcade video game developed by Atari Games in 1989. The player test drives a sports car on courses that emphasize stunts and speed. It features one of the first 3D polygon driving environments via a simulator cabinet with a haptic vibrating steering wheel and a custom rendering architecture.

== Gameplay ==
Arcade version screenshot

The player drives a sports car in a first-person perspective, navigating one to two laps around a stunt track for their best time while avoiding hazards such as vehicles and obstacles. If the player scores in the top 10 during certain modes, they race alongside the computer-controlled Phantom Photon car. A manual transmission mode includes a clutch pedal and the possibility of stalling the car, along with a haptic vibrating steering wheel. The track is a closed race track that splits into two conjoined circuits: a "speed" track, and a "stunt" track, the latter of which features a vertical loop and an open drawbridge. The track also features traffic vehicles driving at regular speed that will crash the player's car upon collision.

The player's driving progress is tracked by invisible waypoints, denoted by flags on the course map when the game ends due to time running out. Passing the waypoint halfway through the track grants the player extra time.

After crashing (either into another vehicle or missing an airborne landing), a ten second instant replay shows a wide aerial view of the player's movement and surrounding vehicles leading up to the crash. Following the replay, the player's car is placed back on the track at the last reached waypoint, which may be a significant distance from where the collision occurred. If the player's car goes off-road, a ten second countdown begins to return to the track. Failure to return in time results in being transported to the previous waypoint.

== Development ==
Development of the 3D computer graphics arcade hardware that was eventually used for Hard Drivin' began in the mid-1980s, several years before the game was released. At the time, Atari Games was owned by Namco, and the two companies began working on a 3D arcade system. After Atari and Namco separated, each company developed its own arcade system in the late 1980s, based on the same prototype. Atari used an earlier version of the hardware for Hard Drivin', and Namco developed a more advanced version of the hardware called the Namco System 21, used for Winning Run (1988).

The development of Hard Drivin' began in 1988. Atari originally intended a 1988 release, but according to one of Atari's engineers and designers, it was delayed due to the dispute from its vice president claiming nobody would buy an arcade cabinet for US$10,000 (equivalent to $27,000 in 2025) after The Last Starfighter arcade game was canceled for that reason a few years earlier. Weeks of research concluded that this price was acceptable.

In addition to the 68010 main CPU, Hard Drivin' uses two TMS34010 32-bit graphics-oriented processors and a digital signal processor.

=== Physics ===
The engine, transmission control, suspension, and tire physics were modeled in conjunction with Doug Milliken who co-authored the book Race Car Vehicle Dynamics, and is listed as a test driver in the game credits. In the 1950s, his father William Milliken of Milliken Research led a team at Cornell Aeronautical Laboratory in Buffalo, New York (later Calspan) that converted aircraft equations of motion to equations of motion for the automobile, and became one of the world's leading experts in car modeling.

== Ports ==
The contemporary home systems Hard Drivin' was ported to have less computing power than the arcade machine. These include the Amstrad CPC, Mega Drive/Genesis, and Atari Lynx. The Commodore 64 version was only released as part of the Wheels of Fire compilation. A version for the NES was programmed by Mark Morris, but was unreleased.

== Reception ==
Reception

Review scores
Publication	Score
ACE	937/1000 (Atari ST); 921/1000 (Spectrum)
Crash	92% (Spectrum)
Famitsu	7/10, 7/10, 8/10, 8/10 (Mega Drive)
GamePro	21/25 (Genesis)
IGN	6/10 (Lynx)
Sinclair User	78% (Spectrum)
Your Sinclair	90% (Spectrum)
Commodore User	8/10 (arcade)
MegaTech	89% (Mega Drive)

Award
Publication	Award
Crash	Smash

Atari sold 3,318 Hard Drivin' arcade cabinets. In Japan, Game Machine listed Hard Drivin' in its June 1, 1989, issue as the second most successful upright/cockpit arcade cabinet of the month. It became Japan's sixth highest-grossing dedicated arcade game of 1990. On Hong Kong's Bondeal charts, it topped the dedicated arcade cabinet chart in November 1989. The Spectrum version rose to number 2 in the UK sales charts, behind Gazza's Superstar Soccer.

Nick Kelly of Commodore User reviewed the arcade version and said: "Hard Drivin' is exactly what its name suggests — difficult. You won't master this quickly, and if you aren't used to driving a car it's going to be very tough for you indeed. But Atari can be proud of themselves for producing a coin-op which really does put you in the driving seat, and that is undeniably a major first".

Zzap!64 magazine regarded the Commodore 64 port as one of the worst C64 games of all time—criticizing the monochrome graphics, painful slowdown, and the lack of instant replays in the other 8-bit conversions. The magazine gave the game 20%. Commodore Force magazine, the successor to Zzap!64, awarded the Commodore 64 port a score of 9%, citing it as "obscenely slow, uninteresting and phenomenally boring".

In August 2012, website AusRetroGamer reviewed the Commodore 64 version as part of Review A Bad Game Day and awarded the game an overall score of 4%, citing "Hard Drivin' on the C64 wins the turd ribbon for being exactly that, a stinking turd."

In Japan, the Mega Drive version received a score of 30 out of 40 from a panel of four reviewers.

=== Accolades ===
Your Sinclair listed it as the best arcade game of 1989. Computer and Video Games listed it as the fourth best arcade game of 1989. The home computer ports received the Best Coin-Op Conversion prize at the 1989 Golden Joystick Awards. Crash gave it a Crash Smash award. The Games Machine gave it a Star Player award.

== Legacy ==
In 2004, Hard Drivin' was released for the GameCube, PlayStation 2, and Xbox as part of the Midway Arcade Treasures 2 collection.

=== Sequels ===
An arcade system sequel named Race Drivin' was released in 1990, while a sequel, released in 1991 for the Atari ST, Amiga, and MS-DOS computer systems, was named Hard Drivin' II - Drive Harder. Two further sequels, Hard Drivin's Airborne (1993) and Street Drivin' (1993) were unreleased.
