= Super Monaco GP =

1989 video game

- Japanese arcade flyer
- Developer: Sega (Note: Master System version co-developed by Arc System Works)
- Publisher: Sega
- Director: Hisao Oguchi
- Series: Monaco GP
- Platforms: Arcade, Mega Drive/Genesis, Amiga, Amstrad CPC, Atari ST, Commodore 64, Game Gear, Master System, ZX Spectrum
- Release: June 1989: Arcade; JP: June 1989; NA: August 1989; UK: 1989; Genesis; JP: August 9, 1990; NA: September 1990; EU: January 1991; Master System; NA: September 1990; EU: 1990; Game Gear; JP: October 6, 1990; NA: April 1991; EU: 1991; Amiga, Amstrad CPC, Atari ST, Commodore 64, ZX Spectrum; UK: April 1991
- Genre: Racing
- Modes: Single-player, up to 8 players (arcade)
- Arcade system: Sega X Board

Super Monaco GP (Note: Japanese: スーパーモナコGP, Hepburn: Sūpā Monako GP) is a Formula One racing simulation video game released by Sega, originally as a Sega X Board arcade game in 1989, followed by ports for multiple video game consoles and home computers in the early 1990s. It is the sequel to the 1979 arcade game Monaco GP. The arcade game consists of one race, the Monaco Grand Prix, but later ports added more courses and game modes based on the 1989 Formula One World Championship.

The original concept for Super Monaco GP came from Hisao Oguchi, who was at the time a game planner with Sega. The arcade game contained parodies of actual brands that were sponsors in Formula One, which led to a lawsuit from Philip Morris over advertising of tobacco products. Shortly after the arcade game launch, Super Monaco GP was ported to Sega's video game consoles, the Genesis, Master System, and Game Gear. British developer U.S. Gold published ports for home computers.

The arcade game was a major worldwide hit; in Japan, it was the third highest-grossing arcade game of 1989 and then the highest-grossing dedicated arcade game of 1990. The arcade and Genesis versions received positive reviews from critics, focused on the game's graphics and playability. Ports for 8-bit systems ranged from mixed to generally favorable depending on the platforms, with the conversions less well received for their difficulty and differences in gameplay.

== Gameplay ==
A typical in-game screenshot from the arcade version of Super Monaco GP. The rear-view mirror is at the top, and information is provided to the player all over the screen.

In the arcade version of Super Monaco GP, the game is a simulation of the Monaco Grand Prix, although the actual Circuit de Monaco is replaced by a fictional track that includes many features of the actual circuit. Players must qualify for the race around a short circuit before playing the main race; failing to complete the lap before the 45-second timer ends results in a Game over. Performance on the practice lap will determine the player's starting grid position. The race is then played against 19 computer controlled drivers, and players have to maintain above a position limit which counts down, or else the game ends. Completing the race in third place or better allows the player to race again in wet conditions.

Each race consists of three laps on the main track. Before a race begins, the player has selection of the car's transmission, among an automatic, 4-speed manual, and 7-speed manual. Players control their car with a steering wheel and shift with plates mounted behind the wheel, in a similar system to cars made by Ferrari. Acceleration and braking are handled by pedals. The top 20% of the game screen serves like a rear-view mirror, allowing players to see behind their car. Up to eight cabinets are able to be linked via Sega's "Power Link" cable.

In addition to the arcade mode, the Sega Genesis version adds a World Championship mode to the gameplay. In the mode, players race against computer-controlled opponents across racetracks including Brands Hatch and Hockenheimring, encompassing all of the tracks of the 1989 Formula One World Championship. The goal of the game is to win the World Championship against other drivers. During the course of a season, players are able to be invited to join a better racing team, giving them a faster car to race. A password system is used to save progress in the World Championship mode, which takes approximately two hours to complete. The Sega CD version is mostly identical to the Genesis version with minor improvements to the game's sound effects.

Unlike the Genesis port, the Master System version is not a true conversion of the original arcade game. The game includes a Grand Prix mode, which allows the player to race on a series of tracks, as well as a versus mode where two players can compete in a race between one and nine laps. The transmission selection is also different, allowing selections between 3, 5, and 7 speeds. The Amiga and Commodore 64 ports each offer four tracks for play with arcade mode, and the Amiga release offers the option of steering with either a joystick or a mouse.

== History and technical aspects ==
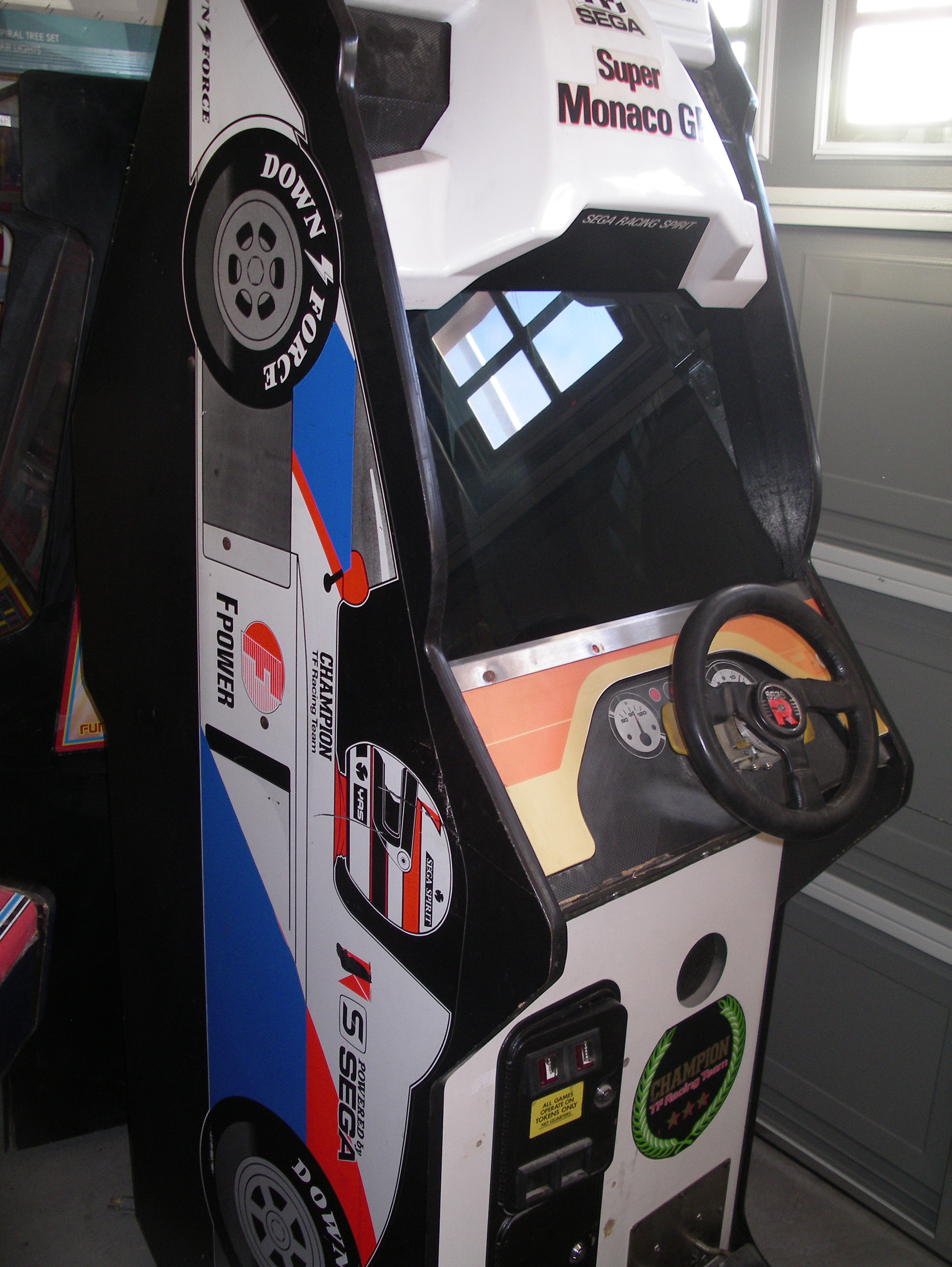
A Super Monaco GP upright arcade cabinet

The idea for Super Monaco GP's arcade version came from Hisao Oguchi, who was at the time a game planner with Sega. At a younger age, Oguchi had played Monaco GP, released by Sega in 1979. When Oguchi decided to design a game based on Formula One, he started with a different name but chose Super Monaco GP after listening to opinions that the name was a good one. He referenced a parallel between the Monaco Grand Prix being the top event in racing and Sega being the top company in arcades. The game was also developed for the tenth anniversary of Monaco GP.

Super Monaco GP was the first arcade game where the arcade cabinet gave direct feedback in response to gameplay. The game's steering wheel includes force feedback with precision in response to the player's movements in-game. Utilizing the Sega X Board for an arcade system board, Super Monaco GP runs at 60 frames per second and displays on a 26 inch screen. The cabinet also includes a Fresnel lens to make the image on the game appear larger. The deluxe arcade cabinet came equipped with Sega's "Air Drive" system that would move the driver's seat in order to increase the sense of realism the player would feel. Up to eight cabinets are able to be linked via Sega's "Power Link" cable that was first demonstrated at the 1988 AMOA show. Both a deluxe and an upright version of the cabinet were available, and all models were painted to look like cars from F1 team McLaren, the team of 1988 F1 champion Ayrton Senna.

Super Monaco GP was released for arcades in May 1989 in Japan. It debuted in the United States in August the same year, when Sega Enterprises USA president Tom Petit debuted it to arcade distributors at the Sofitel Hotel in Chicago. There, Petit revealed to approximately 40 other companies the success the game had in Europe and Asia, and its successful test results in the US, as well as a North American launch date in September. Shortly after the arcade release, Super Monaco GP was ported to the Sega Genesis, Master System, and Game Gear, and was also released for the Sega CD as part of Sega Classics Arcade Collection. The Game Gear release was one of three launch titles for the system. To make up for the lack of engagement the home game had in comparison to the arcade cabinet, Sega added more tracks and gameplay modes. It was also ported by Probe Software and published by U.S. Gold to computers, including the Amiga, Commodore 64, Atari ST, Amstrad CPC, and ZX Spectrum. According to programmer David Shea, who did the port for the ZX Spectrum, the idea of the port was more about capturing the spirit of the arcade game rather than trying to replicate it.

=== Phillip Morris controversy ===
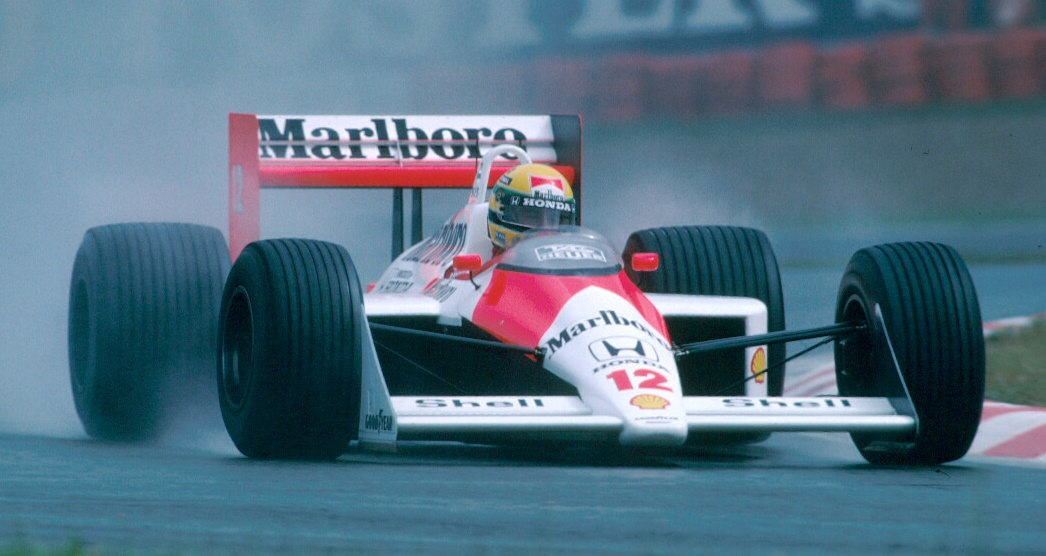
Super Monaco GP's arcade cabinets were designed to look like F1 cars from McLaren and 1988 F1 champion Ayrton Senna. McLaren's sponsor, cigarette brand Marlboro, was parodied as "Marlbobo" in the arcade game's initial release, prompting a lawsuit from the brand's manufacturer, Philip Morris.

Although the initial release to distributors of the arcade version had been very popular, Super Monaco GP was the subject of a lawsuit by Philip Morris over its Marlboro brand of cigarettes being parodied in the game as "Marlbobo". It had not been the only brand to be parodied, as brands such as Ford were parodied as "Fodo", BP as "BF", Honda as "Henda", FIA as "EIA" and Canon as "Conan", in addition to use of Playboy images of models edited to wear swimsuits. In-game appearances of "Marlbobo", however, had led to a complaint to the U.S. Federal Trade Commission by a professor from the Medical College of Georgia that Super Monaco GP was advertising cigarettes to children, the majority of players of arcade games. Philip Morris contacted Sega over the issue in November 1989, and Sega agreed to release a conversion kit removing the advertising in March 1990; the offending parody (as well as parody of Foster's called "Hoster's") were replaced with logos for Flicky, an older Sega arcade game. Sega argued the parodies were the attempts of game developers to create a realistic environment. With arcade units still featuring the parody after this release, Philip Morris sued Sega in February 1991. The tobacco company had also sued Namco over Marlboro imagery in its 1987 game Final Lap. Philip Morris wanted a total recall of the game as well as financial compensation and all advertising material destroyed, but settled with Sega in May 1992. As a condition of the settlement, Sega ran advertisements in arcade publications RePlay and Play Meter to offer to replace the chips in the game with new ones without advertising and pay each arcade operator $200 for returning the original chips. After the settlement, some tobacco critics were critical of Philip Morris' actions in the suit, calling the tobacco company's actions a publicity stunt.

== Reception ==
Reviews

Review scores
Publication	Score					
Publication	Amiga	Arcade	Game Gear	Master System	Sega Genesis	ZX
ACE	871	5/5			590	
Computer and Video Games	85%	94%		92%	95%	
Electronic Gaming Monthly				4/10, 6/10, 5/10, 4/10	9/10, 10/10, 9/10, 10/10	
Famitsu		8/10, 9/10, 7/10, 7/10	7/10, 6/10, 8/10, 5/10			
GamePro					20/25	
Joystick	90%			75%	98%	
Mean Machines Sega			58%	79%	87%	
Sinclair User		9/10				84%
Your Sinclair						82%
Zzap!64	91%					
Commodore User	85%	91%				
Mean Machines					93%	
Mega					90%	
Raze	83%			87%	91%	
Sega Power					92%	
Sega Pro			65%	69%	90%	

According to Sega Enterprises USA head Tom Petit, the arcade game was very successful, especially in Asian and European markets. In Japan, on Famicom Tsūshin's arcade earnings chart, it was second in August 1989, just below Namco's 3D polygon racing game Winning Run. It became the publication's top earner in September 1989, and retained its spot in October 1989 above Sega's arcade version of Tetris. It ended the year as the third highest-grossing arcade game of 1989 in Japan, just below Sega's Tetris and Namco's Winning Run. Super Monaco GP was later Japan's highest-grossing dedicated arcade game of 1990, third highest-grossing dedicated arcade game of 1991, and eleventh highest-grossing arcade game of 1992. At the 1989 Gamest Awards in Japan, Super Monaco GP won a Special Award, and was nominated in the "Best Action" and "Best Graphics" categories.

The arcade version of Super Monaco GP was praised by reviewers. It came in second place on Computer and Video Games magazine's list of the top arcade games of 1989. A reviewer for Commodore User called the game "beyond doubt the most realistic driving game I've ever played", and highlighted the game's graphics, arcade cabinet experience, and high level of difficulty. Another reviewer, for Sinclair User, called Super Monaco GP "fast, loud, hugely colourful, and massively detailed". Reviews for ACE and Computer and Video Games also strongly recommended readers to play the game for its fun experience. Ayrton Senna was reportedly a fan of the coin-op game, and this factored into his contributions to the game's sequel, Ayrton Senna's Super Monaco GP II.

The Genesis version was also highly acclaimed. Two reviewers for Mean Machines praised the game's graphics and replayability, as well as the added World Championship mode. According to Mega in 1994, it set a standard "that many still fail to emulate". As of June 1994, it was still the publication's best reviewed driving game for the Mega Drive. (Note: Mega Drive and Sega Genesis are the same console. The name "Mega Drive" was used for the console in most areas outside of North America.) Julian Boardman of Raze gave it a positive review for its realism and ease of reading the screen layout, though noted that accidentally shifting gear while trying to steer was a distinct possibility with the controller. ACE's Tony Dillon was less positive about the gameplay, criticizing that it offers no new concepts that have not been done in racing games before and that the game is "an uninspired conversion of the coin-op". According to video game journalist Ken Horowitz, this port brought the most attention to the franchise. Retrospectively, Nick Thorpe of Retro Gamer pointed out the reduced graphics detail of the port but said the port "should be the version of choice for most players" for its World Championship mode and accurate porting of the gameplay.

Super Monaco GP's ports to 8-bit Sega consoles were less well received, generally favorable for the Master System but mixed for the Game Gear. Computer and Video Games considered it the best driving game available for the Master System in 1990. Writing for Computer and Video Games, Julian Rignall praised the Master System version's lasting value for fun, but noted the learning curve with the sensitivity of the steering. Boardman called the Master System port "a very competent driving game" but "not a true conversion of the Sega arcade machine" and pointed out elements missing in the game. Mean Machines Sega panned the Game Gear conversion, calling the game "just too dull for words". Retrospective, Thorpe was critical of the handling and speed of the gameplay in the Master System version, as well as the change to a third-person perspective. He noted the Game Gear version is faster but otherwise possesses the same issues.

The computer ports of the game have received mixed reviews based on the system. Two reviewers from Zzap!64 compared the Commodore 64 port with the Amiga port and gave higher marks to the C64's colorful graphics, but more sensation of speed on the Amiga. In reviewing the ZX Spectrum version, reviewer James Leach of Your Sinclair was critical of the game's graphics as being too fast, but praised the game as being fun. Thorpe stated that the ZX Spectrum version is "actually not too bad at all, even though it does feel rather sluggish", dampening the criticism of Shea, who was not pleased with the final result of his port. He felt the Commodore 64 version was a good game despite a difficult viewing angle and easy gameplay, and that the Amiga version possessed high quality graphics and a high degree of difficulty. In comparison to the Amiga version, Thorpe felt the Atari ST version was easier to control, though slightly lower quality in graphics and audio. For the Amstrad CPC version, he expressed that the poor frame rate and lack of a sensation of speed made it the worst version of the game.

== See also ==
- Power Drift
- Virtua Racing
- Indy 500
