= Index of DOS games (B) =

This is an index of DOS games.

This list has been split into multiple pages. Please use the Table of Contents to browse it.

Title	Released	Developer(s)	Publisher(s)
B-17 Flying Fortress	1992	Vektor Grafix	MicroProse
B-1 Nuclear Bomber	1983	Microcomputer Games	Avalon Hill
Baal	1988	Psygnosis	Psyclapse
Back to Baghdad	1996	Military Simulations Inc.	Military Simulations Inc.
Back to the Future Part II	1990	Image Works	Mirrorsoft
Back to the Future Part III	1991	Probe Software	Image Works
Backyard, The	1993	Broderbund	Broderbund
Bad Blood	1990	Origin Systems	Origin Systems
Bad Dudes	1988	Quicksilver Software	Data East
Bad Street Brawler	1987	Beam Software	Mindscape
Balance of Power	1985	Chris Crawford	Mindscape
Balance of the Planet	1990	Chris Crawford	Chris Crawford
Baldies	1996	Creative Edge Software	Panasonic Interactive Media
Ballistix	1989	Psygnosis	Psygnosis
Ballyhoo	1985	Infocom	Infocom
Bandit Kings of Ancient China	1989	Koei	Koei
Banzai - Death Sortie of the Yamato	1991	General Quarters Software	General Quarters Software
Barbarian	1989	Mastertronic	Psygnosis
Barbarian: The Ultimate Warrior	1987	Palace Software	Palace Software, Epyx
Barbarian II: The Dungeon of Drax	1989	Palace Software	Palace Software, Epyx
Barbie Super Model	1993	Tahoe Software Productions	Hi Tech Expressions
Bard's Tale, The	1985	Interplay Productions	Electronic Arts
Bard's Tale Construction Set, The	1991	Interplay Productions	Electronic Arts
Bard's Tale II, The: The Destiny Knight	1986	Interplay Productions	Electronic Arts
Bard's Tale III, The: Thief of Fate	1988	Interplay Productions	Electronic Arts
Bargon Attack	1992	Coktel Vision	Coktel Vision
Baron: The Real Estate Simulation	1983	Blue Chip Software	Blue Chip Software
Bart's House of Weirdness	1992	Distinctive Software	Konami
B.A.T.	1990	Computer's Dream	Ubisoft
B.A.T. II – The Koshan Conspiracy	1992	Computer's Dream	Ubisoft
Batman: The Caped Crusader	1988	Special FX Software	Ocean Software
Batman: The Movie	1989	Astros Productions	Ocean Software, Data East
Batman Forever	1996	Probe Entertainment	Acclaim Entertainment
Batman Forever: The Arcade Game	1996	Iguana Entertainment	Acclaim Entertainment
Batman Returns	1993	Spirit of Discovery (Game developers)	Konami
Battle Arena Toshinden	1995	Tamsoft	Sony Computer Entertainment
Battle Bugs	1994	Epyx	Sierra On-Line
Battle Chess	1988	Interplay Productions	Interplay Productions
Battle Chess (MPC Version)	1991	Interplay Productions	Interplay Productions
Battle Chess II: Chinese Chess	1990	Interplay Productions	Interplay Productions
Battle Chess 4000	1992	Interplay Productions	Interplay Productions
Battle Command	1990	Realtime Games	Ocean Software
Battle for Atlantis	1990	Soleau Software	Soleau Software
Battle for Normandy	1983	Tactical Design Group	Strategic Simulations
Battle Isle	1991	Blue Byte	Ubi Soft
Battle Isle 2200	1994	Blue Byte	Blue Byte
Battle Master	1991	Personal Software Services	Mirrorsoft
Battle of Antietam	1986	Strategic Simulations	Strategic Simulations
Battle of the Bulge: Tigers in the Snow	1999	Atomic Games	Mindscape
Battlehawks 1942	1988	LucasFilm Games	LucasFilm Games
Battleships	1987	Elite Systems	Elite Systems
Battles in Time	1995	Quantum Quality Productions	Quantum Quality Productions
Battles of Destiny	1992	Holistic Design	Quantum Quality Productions
Battles of Napoleon	1988	Chuck Kroegel, David Landrey	Strategic Simulations
BattleSport	1997	Cyclone Studios	3DO Company
BattleTech: The Crescent Hawk's Inception	1988	Westwood Studios	Infocom
BattleTech: The Crescent Hawk's Revenge	1990	Westwood Studios	Infocom
Battlezone	1983	Atari	Atarisoft
BC Racers	1995	Core Design	Core Design
B.C.'s Quest for Tires	1983	Sydney Development	Sierra On-Line
Beast	1984	Dan Baker	
Beast Within, The: A Gabriel Knight Mystery	1995	Sierra Entertainment	Sierra Entertainment
Beetlejuice in: Skeletons in the Closet	1990	Hi Tech Expressions	Hi Tech Expressions
Below the Root	1984	Dale Disharoon	Windham Classics
Beneath a Steel Sky	1994	Revolution Software	Virgin Interactive
Beneath Apple Manor	1983	Quality Software	
Berenstain Bears, The: Learning at Home, Volume One	1993	Compton's New Media	Compton's New Media
Berlin Connection	1994	Promotion Software	Berliner Morgenpost
Berserker Raids	1984	Berserker Works	Baen Software
Best of the Best: Championship Karate	1992	Loriciel	Loriciel
Betrayal at Krondor	1993	Dynamix	Sierra On-Line
Beverly Hills Cop	1990	Tynesoft	Tynesoft
Beyond Castle Wolfenstein	1984	Muse Software	Muse Software
Beyond the Black Hole	1989	Software Toolworks	Software Toolworks
Beyond the Tesseract	1988	David Lo	
Beyond the Titanic	1986	Apogee Software	Apogee Software
Beyond Zork: The Coconut of Quendor	1987	Infocom	Infocom
Bible Adventures	1991	Wisdom Tree	Wisdom Tree
Bible Builder	1992	Everbright	Everbright
Big Red Adventure, The	1995	Dynabyte	Core Design
Big Red Racing	1996	Big Red Software	Domark
Big Top	1983	Michael Abrash	Funtastic
Bill Elliot's NASCAR Challenge	1990	Distinctive Software	Konami
Bill & Ted's Excellent Adventure	1990	IntraCorp, Off the Wall Productions	Capstone Software
Bioforge	1995	Origin Systems	Origin Systems
Bio Menace	1993	Apogee Software	Apogee Software
Bionic Commando	1987	Pacific Dataworks International	Capcom
Birds of Prey	1991	Electronic Arts	Argonaut Games
Birthright: The Gorgon's Alliance	1996	Synergistic Software	Sierra On-Line
Black Cauldron, The	1986	Sierra On-Line	Sierra On-Line
Blackthorne	1994	Blizzard Entertainment	Interplay Entertainment
Blades of Steel	1990	Novotrade International	Konami
Blade Warrior	1991	Image Works	Image Works
Blake Stone: Aliens of Gold	1993	JAM Productions	Apogee Software
Blake Stone: Planet Strike	1994	JAM Productions	Apogee Software
Blam! Machinehead	1996	Core Design	Eidos Interactive
Blast Chamber	1997	Attention to Detail	Activision
Blockade	1986	Don Laabs	
Blockout	1989	P.Z.Karen Co. Development Group	California Dreams
Blood	1997	Monolith Productions	GT Interactive
Blood Bowl	1995	Destiny Software Productions	MicroLeague
Blood & Magic	1996	Tachyon Studios	Interplay Entertainment
Blood Money	1989	DMA Design	Psygnosis
BloodNet	1993	MicroProse	MicroProse
Bloodstone: An Epic Dwarven Tale	1993	Mindcraft Software	Mindcraft Software
Bloodwings: Pumpkinhead's Revenge	1995	BAP Interactive	Electronic Arts
Bloodwych	1989	Image Works	Konami, Image Works
Blue Angels: Formation Flight Simulation	1989	Artech Digital Entertainment	Accolade
Blue Force	1993	Jim Walls	Tsunami Games
Blue Ice	1995	Art of Mind Productions	Psygnosis
Blues Brothers, The	1991	Titus Software	Titus Software
Bobby Fischer Teaches Chess	1994	Bookup, Inc.	Mission Studios
BoBo	1988	Infogrames	Infogrames
Body Blows	1993	Team17	Team17
Bodyworks Voyager – Mission in Anatomy	1994	Mythos Software	Software Marketing Corporation
Bolo Ball	1987/1994	Application Systems Heidelberg	Dongleware Verlags
Bomberman	1992	Hudson Soft	Ubisoft
Bombuzal	1988	Image Works	Image Works, Kemco
Boot Camp	1989	Banana Development Corporation	Konami
Bop'N Wrestle	1986	Beam Software	Mindscape
Boppin'	1994	Accursed Toys	Apogee Software
Border Zone	1987	Infocom	Infocom
Borrowed Time	1985	Activision	Interplay Entertainment
Boulder Dash	1984	First Star Software	First Star Software
Boulder Dash Construction Kit	1986	First Star Software	First Star Software
Brain Dead 13	1995	ReadySoft	ReadySoft
Brainies, The	1996	Titus Software	Titus Software
Bram Stoker's Dracula	1993	Psygnosis, Traveller's Tales	Sony Imagesoft
Brandish	1994	Nihon Falcom	Nihon Falcom
Brandish 2: The Planet Buster	1995	Nihon Falcom	Nihon Falcom
Breach 2	1990	Omnitrend Software	Impressions Games
Breach 3	1995	Omnitrend Software	Impressions Games
BreakThru!	1994	ZOO Corporation	Spectrum Holobyte
Brett Hull Hockey 95	1995	Accolade	Accolade
British Square	1990	Scott Pakin	
Brix	1992	Michael Riedel	Epic MegaGames
Broken Sword: The Shadow of the Templars	1996	Revolution Software	Virgin Interactive
Bruce Lee	1984	Datasoft	Datasoft
Bruce Lee Lives: The Fall of Hong Kong Palace	1989	Software Toolworks	Software Toolworks
Brutal: Paws of Fury	1994	GameTek, Eurocom	GameTek
Brutal Sports Football	1993	Teque Software Development	Millennium Interactive
Bubble Bobble	1989	Novalogic	Taito
Bubble Dizzy	1990	The Oliver Twins	Codemasters
Bubble Ghost	1988	Infogrames	ERE Informatique, Infogrames, Accolade, Pony Canyon
Buck Rogers: Countdown to Doomsday	1990	Strategic Simulations	Strategic Simulations
Buck Rogers: Matrix Cubed	1992	Strategic Simulations	Strategic Simulations
Buck Rogers: Planet of Zoom	1984	Sega	Sega
Bud Tucker in Double Trouble	1996	Merit Studios	TopWare
Budokan: The Martial Spirit	1989	Electronic Arts	Electronic Arts
Bulls and Bears	1992	Ronald L. Crabb	
Bumpy's Arcade Fantasy	1992	Loriciel	Loriciel
Bureau 13	1995	Take-Two Interactive	GameTek
Bureaucracy	1987	Infocom	Infocom
BurgerTime	1982	Mattel Electronics	Mattel Electronics
Burnout: Championship Drag Racing	1998	Bethesda Softworks	Bethesda Softworks
Burntime	1993	Max Design	Max Design
BushBuck Charms, Viking Ships & Dodo Eggs	1991	Reckon	PC Globe
Buzz Aldrin's Race into Space	1993	Strategic Visions	Interplay Entertainment
