= The Bugs Bunny Crazy Castle =

1989 video game

- North American NES box art
- Developer: Kemco
- Publishers: JP/EU: Kemco; NA: Seika; NA: Nintendo (Player's Choice)
- Platforms: NES, Famicom Disk System, Game Boy
- Release: Famicom Disk System: JP: February 16, 1989 (Roger Rabbit); NES: NA: September 1989; Game Boy: JP: September 5, 1989 (Mickey Mouse); US: March 1990; EU: 1990; JP: December 19, 1997 (Bugs Bunny); US: 1998 (Player's Choice)
- Genre: Puzzle
- Mode: Single-player

The Bugs Bunny Crazy Castle, also known as simply Bugs Bunny, is a 1989 puzzle video game developed by Kemco for the Nintendo Entertainment System and Game Boy. It is the first puzzle game in Kemco's Crazy Castle series.

Both the NES and Game Boy versions are Bugs Bunny reskins of Kemco's Roger Rabbit (Note: Japanese: ロジャーラビット, Hepburn: Rojā Rabitto) for the Family Computer Disk System and Mickey Mouse (Note: Japanese: ミッキーマウス, Hepburn: Mikkī Mausu) for the Game Boy. The Bugs Bunny version would be released in Japan in 1997 through Bugs Bunny Collection (Note: Japanese: バックス・バニーコレクション, Hepburn: Bakkusu Banī Korekushon), a Game Boy compilation containing this game and its 1991 sequel The Bugs Bunny Crazy Castle 2.

Each version of the game features different cartoon characters based on their respective titles: Bugs Bunny, Roger Rabbit, or Mickey Mouse. The object of the game is to go through a series of rooms collecting items to advance to higher levels while avoiding related cartoon characters.

== Gameplay ==
While presented in a side-scroller format, Crazy Castle differs from standard side-scrollers such as Super Mario Bros. in that Bugs Bunny does not have the ability to jump; therefore, only by taking different routes can Bugs avoid enemies. Some of the levels have boxing gloves, invincibility potions, safes, crates, flower pots, or ten thousand-pound weights that can be used against the enemies in the game. As a result, the game has a "puzzle-solving" atmosphere.

Players score 100 points for every carrot with the last one in each floor giving the player an extra life, 100 points for every enemy defeated using invincibility bottles, 500 points per enemy using boxing glove, and 1000 points per enemy that gets hit with heavy objects. Because most NES game cartridges lacked the ability to save, passwords can be used to start at a certain level in this game.

== Plot ==
Honey Bunny has been kidnapped by Wile E. Coyote, Yosemite Sam, Daffy Duck, and Sylvester the Cat. Bugs Bunny must travel through 60 levels (80 in the Game Boy version) in order to save her. To get past each level, Bugs must collect all 8 carrots in each level.

== Characters ==
There are four minions - Sylvester, Daffy Duck, Wile E. Coyote and Yosemite Sam, each with their own unique movement patterns. However, the Sylvester character has three variations - two gray, one green and one pink, Daffy has two variations, one being dark gray and one brown, and Yosemite Sam being either in blue or brown. The three variations of Sylvester all have different AI, but the different variations of Daffy and Sam do not.

- Gray Sylvester - can only travel up a floor or a tube; cannot bypass a door or tube without going through it; cannot go under staircases; cannot stop moving; two of this kind can be used in a single level.
- Green Sylvester - can travel both up and down a floor or tube; can bypass a door or tube without going through it; can go under staircases; cannot stop moving; has a tendency to go up and down floors and tubes back and forth repeatedly.
- Pink Sylvester - can only travel up a floor or a tube; cannot bypass a door or tube without going through it; cannot go under staircases; able to stop moving after a short distance travelled; when he stops, the direction Bugs moves next is the direction he will move, assuming he is able to do so.
- Yosemite Sam / Wile E. Coyote - cannot go through doors or tubes; once they've traveled down a staircase, they cannot go back up; cannot stop moving.
- Daffy Duck - cannot go through doors or tubes; once he has traveled down a staircase, he cannot go back up; able to stop moving after a short distance travelled; when he stops, the direction Bugs moves next is the direction he will move, assuming he is able to do so.

== Development ==
The North American NES game is a modified version of the Japan-exclusive Family Computer Disk System title, Roger Rabbit. Roger Rabbit is the game's playable character, all the villains are Who Framed Roger Rabbit-related, and hearts are collected. Due to Capcom owning the rights to develop and publish Disney film-based video games, as well as LJN already having published Rare's own video game adaptation of the film, Kemco decided to use Bugs Bunny, due to him and Roger both being rabbits, making it easier for Kemco to modify the Roger Rabbit game and release it outside Japan as The Bugs Bunny Crazy Castle. For the Game Boy version, Kemco's license to develop and/or publish video games based on Who Framed Roger Rabbit became outdated; however, they still had the license to create Disney-based video games, which they used to create Mickey Mouse for Game Boy. An early beta version of the game shows the working title as Bugs Bunny Fun House. In 1997, Kemco released the Game Boy version along with The Bugs Bunny Crazy Castle 2 in one cartridge under the name Bugs Bunny Collection.

== Sequels ==
The game has spawned three sequels, including The Bugs Bunny Crazy Castle 2, Bugs Bunny: Crazy Castle 3, Bugs Bunny in Crazy Castle 4 and a spin-off game, Woody Woodpecker in Crazy Castle 5.

The Game Boy Japanese version, Mickey Mouse, has spawned four sequels, including Mickey Mouse II, Mickey Mouse III: Balloon Dreams, Mickey Mouse IV: The Magical Labyrinth, and Mickey Mouse V: The Magical Stick (later known as Magic Wands). Other games published by Kemco with Mickey Mouse include the Japanese version of the unrelated game Mickey's Chase, originally from Capcom.

== Legacy ==
The NES version of Bugs Bunny Crazy Castle was prominently featured in an Angry Video Game Nerd episode of the same name, which was released on August 5, 2009. It was featured again in the 2021 feature film, Space Jam: A New Legacy for a few brief moments, where a young LeBron James is given a Game Boy with the game inside it.

== Reviews ==
- Defunct Games
- NES Archives
- Random Access
- Retro Game Reviews
- Classic-games.net
- Wizard Dojo
- The Video Game Critic
- Questicle.net
- Zero
- Amstar
- Power Play
