= Nintendo Selects =

Marketing label by Nintendo

Official banner

Nintendo Selects (and its predecessor, Player's Choice) was a marketing label previously used by Nintendo to promote best-selling video games on Nintendo game consoles. Nintendo Selects titles were sold at a lower price point than new releases. The program paralleled other budget range software by Sega (Sega All Stars), Sony (the Greatest Hits and Essentials), and Microsoft (Platinum Hits and Xbox Classics) to promote best-selling games on their consoles as well. In Japan, the discount label was introduced for various Nintendo 3DS titles as the Happy Price Selection, although South Korea adopted the Nintendo Selects name at an earlier period. The most recent Nintendo Selects titles were released for South Korea and Japan.

== History ==
=== 1996–2011: Player's Choice ===
In North America and Europe, Nintendo introduced the label on May 20, 1996, as "Player's Choice" both for the Super Nintendo Entertainment System and for the Game Boy to distinguish titles that had sold over one million copies. Super NES games had the "Super Nintendo Entertainment System" wordmark written in gold (instead of the usual red) on the box, along with a "Player's Choice" seal. European SNES and Game Boy releases were labeled differently in various markets (such as Mario Classics in Spain, Nintendo Classics in UK and Netherlands, and (Super) Classic Series in Germany and France), comparing closer to the European version of the Classic Series label for the NES games, featuring the same Mario medal. Furthermore, all boxes were overhauled in red except Disney games, which received blue boxes.

Player's Choice was eventually introduced for Nintendo 64 games that sold over 1 million units. North American NTSC "Player's Choice" games can be identified on the Nintendo 64 by the yellow background of the N64 logo in the upper right corner of the game box. On the GameCube and Game Boy Advance, games are marked in a yellow box on the top of the case. PAL region Player's Choice games have boxes that are colored silver or platinum with Player's Choice markings on the right hand side of a Nintendo 64 box or on the top of a GameCube box.

The Player's Choice line was introduced for GameCube titles in January 2003. However, the sales barrier for games was decreased from 1 million, down to 450,000 by June 2003. The first titles were Super Smash Bros. Melee, Pikmin, and Luigi's Mansion, and they each retailed for US$29.99. Later in the year, when six new titles were added, Nintendo split the pricing for different sets of GameCube games, so that some titles would enter in or stay at US$29.99 while others would be reduced immediately to US$19.99. In April 2006, the "Player's Choice" label was applied to Game Boy Advance games, which sell for $19.99 in the United States.

=== 2011–2019: Nintendo Selects ===
The Player's Choice label was renamed Nintendo Selects in May 2011. The first Wii games added were The Legend of Zelda: Twilight Princess, Animal Crossing: City Folk, Mario Super Sluggers and Wii Sports. The New Play Control! version of Pikmin 2 debuted in North America as a Nintendo Selects title, alongside New Play Control! Mario Power Tennis. Mario Party 8 and Wii Sports Resort were added to Nintendo Selects line in 2013 in UK. These launches coincided with the Wii Mini launch, on March 22. Super Smash Bros. Brawl, Mario Kart Wii, Super Mario Galaxy, The Legend of Zelda: Twilight Princess and Wii Sports + Wii Sports Resort were added to the new Nintendo Selects Australian line, priced at AU$49.95 and NZ$59.95 with the release date of November 7, 2013.

As of 2014, recommended retail prices are £19.99 in the United Kingdom, US$19.99 in the United States, CDN$19.99 in Canada, A$49.95 in Australia and €29.99 throughout the Eurozone.

In 2015, Nintendo of Europe began to release Nintendo Selects range of games for the Nintendo 3DS. The label was then expanded to the Wii U alongside select Wii and Nintendo 3DS titles in Canada, released on March 11, 2016, priced at CA$29.99. A range of Nintendo Selects titles was launched the following month in Europe.

== Home console games ==
=== Wii U ===
Game	Release date		
Game	Europe	North America	Australia
Captain Toad: Treasure Tracker	September 30, 2016	Unreleased	Unreleased
Donkey Kong Country: Tropical Freeze	April 15, 2016	March 11, 2016	December 1, 2016
Fast Racing Neo	September 30, 2016	Unreleased	October 1, 2016
Just Dance 2015	Unreleased	2016	Unreleased
The Legend of Zelda: Wind Waker HD	April 15, 2016	August 26, 2016	Unreleased
Lego City Undercover	April 15, 2016	August 26, 2016	May 8, 2016
Mario Party 10	September 30, 2016	Unreleased	Unreleased
NES Remix Pack	Unreleased	March 11, 2016	Unreleased
New Super Mario Bros. U + New Super Luigi U	April 15, 2016	Unreleased	May 8, 2016
Nintendo Land	April 15, 2016	August 26, 2016	May 8, 2016
Pikmin 3	September 30, 2016	March 11, 2016	December 1, 2016
Sonic & All-Stars Racing Transformed	Unreleased	August 20, 2017	Unreleased
SteamWorld Collection	September 30, 2016	Unreleased	October 1, 2016
Super Mario 3D World	September 30, 2016	March 11, 2016	Unreleased
Wii Party U	April 15, 2016	Unreleased	May 8, 2016

=== Wii ===
Game	Release date			
Game	Europe	North America	Australia	South Korea
Animal Crossing: City Folk	May 20, 2011	May 15, 2011	Unreleased	August 28, 2014
Avatar: The Game	September 15, 2011	Unreleased	Unreleased	Unreleased
Donkey Kong Country Returns	October 18, 2013	March 11, 2016	August 27, 2015	Unreleased
Kirby's Epic Yarn	Unreleased	Unreleased	Unreleased	April 23, 2015
The Legend of Zelda: Twilight Princess	September 16, 2011	May 15, 2011	November 7, 2013	August 6, 2015
Mario Kart Wii	October 18, 2013	Unreleased	November 7, 2013	August 28, 2014
Mario Party 8	March 22, 2013	Unreleased	Unreleased	Unreleased
Mario Party 9	November 6, 2014	Unreleased	Unreleased	Unreleased
Mario Power Tennis (Note: Also a New Play Control! title.)	June 22, 2012	June 10, 2012	Unreleased	Unreleased
Mario Strikers Charged	May 20, 2011	August 28, 2011	Unreleased	August 28, 2014
Mario Super Sluggers	Unreleased	May 15, 2011	Unreleased	Unreleased
My Fitness Coach	September 15, 2011	Unreleased	Unreleased	Unreleased
New Super Mario Bros. Wii	June 13, 2014	Unreleased	August 27, 2015	Unreleased
Pikmin 2 (Note: Also a New Play Control! title, except in North America.)	Unreleased	June 10, 2012	Unreleased	Unreleased
PokéPark Wii: Pikachu's Adventure	October 18, 2013	Unreleased	Unreleased	Unreleased
Punch-Out!!	Unreleased	August 28, 2011	Unreleased	Unreleased
Rayman Raving Rabbids	September 15, 2011	Unreleased	Unreleased	Unreleased
Rayman Raving Rabbids 2	September 15, 2011	Unreleased	Unreleased	Unreleased
Rayman Raving Rabbids: TV Party	September 15, 2011	Unreleased	Unreleased	Unreleased
Red Steel	September 15, 2011	Unreleased	Unreleased	Unreleased
Shaun White Snowboarding: Road Trip	September 15, 2011	Unreleased	Unreleased	Unreleased
Summer Sports: Paradise Island	September 15, 2011	Unreleased	Unreleased	Unreleased
Super Mario All-Stars 25th Anniversary Edition	Unreleased	March 11, 2016	Unreleased	Unreleased
Super Mario Galaxy	September 16, 2011	August 28, 2011	November 7, 2013	April 23, 2015
Super Mario Galaxy 2	June 13, 2014	March 11, 2016	August 27, 2015	Unreleased
Super Paper Mario	June 22, 2012	August 28, 2011	Unreleased	Unreleased
Super Smash Bros. Brawl	October 18, 2013	Unreleased	November 7, 2013	November 6, 2014
WarioWare: Smooth Moves	May 20, 2011	Unreleased	Unreleased	Unreleased
Wii Party	June 13, 2014	Unreleased	Unreleased	Unreleased
Wii Sports	May 20, 2011	May 15, 2011	Unreleased	Unreleased
Wii Sports + Wii Sports Resort	Unreleased	Unreleased	November 7, 2013	November 6, 2014
Wii Sports Resort	March 22, 2013	Unreleased	Unreleased	Unreleased

Minna no Susume Selection (for Japan):

- 428: Shibuya Scramble
- Arc Rise Fantasia
- Dragon Ball Z Sparking! Meteor
- Family Ski: World Ski & Snowboard
- Momotaro Dentetsu 16: Moving in Hokkaido!
- Momotaro Dentetsu 2010: Sengoku Ishin no Hero Daishūgō! No Maki
- Oboro Muramasa
- One Piece Unlimited Cruise: Episode 1
- One Piece Unlimited Cruise: Episode 2
- Rune Factory Frontier
- Sengoku Musou 3
- Tales of Graces
- Tales of Symphony: Ratatosk No Kishi

=== GameCube ===
- Animal Crossing
- Burnout
- Cars
- Chicken Little
- The Chronicles of Narnia: The Lion, the Witch and the Wardrobe
- Crash Bandicoot: The Wrath of Cortex
- Crazy Taxi
- Dave Mirra Freestyle BMX 2
- Def Jam Vendetta
- Dragon Ball Z: Budokai
- Enter the Matrix
- Finding Nemo
- F-Zero GX
- Godzilla: Destroy All Monsters Melee
- GoldenEye: Rogue Agent
- Harry Potter and the Chamber of Secrets
- Harry Potter and the Prisoner of Azkaban
- Harry Potter: Quidditch World Cup
- Harvest Moon: A Wonderful Life
- Harvest Moon: Magical Melody
- The Incredibles
- James Bond 007: Agent Under Fire
- James Bond 007: Everything or Nothing
- James Bond 007: Nightfire
- Kirby Air Ride
- The Legend of Zelda: The Wind Waker
- The Legend of Zelda: Four Swords Adventures
- Lego Star Wars: The Video Game
- Lego Star Wars II: The Original Trilogy
- The Lord of the Rings: The Two Towers
- The Lord of the Rings: The Return of the King
- Luigi's Mansion
- Madagascar
- Mario Golf: Toadstool Tour
- Marvel Nemesis: Rise of the Imperfects
- Medal of Honor: Frontline
- Medal of Honor: Rising Sun
- Mega Man Anniversary Collection
- Metal Gear Solid: The Twin Snakes
- Metroid Prime
- Mortal Kombat: Deadly Alliance
- MVP Baseball 2005
- Namco Museum
- Naruto: Clash of Ninja
- Naruto: Clash of Ninja 2
- NBA Street Vol. 2
- Need for Speed: Hot Pursuit 2
- Need for Speed: Most Wanted
- Need for Speed: Underground
- Need for Speed: Underground 2
- Over the Hedge
- Pac-Man Fever
- Pac-Man World 2 / Pac-Man Vs.
- Paper Mario: The Thousand-Year Door
- Pikmin
- Pikmin 2
- Pokémon Colosseum
- Rampage: Total Destruction
- Resident Evil 10th Year Anniversary Collection
- Resident Evil
- Resident Evil Zero
- Resident Evil 4
- Shadow the Hedgehog
- Shark Tale
- Shrek 2
- The Simpsons: Hit & Run
- The Sims
- The Sims Bustin' Out
- Sonic Adventure DX: Director's Cut
- Sonic Adventure 2: Battle
- Sonic Adventure 2-Pack
- Sonic Gems Collection
- Sonic Heroes
- Sonic Heroes & Super Monkey Ball Duo Pack
- Sonic Mega Collection
- Sonic Riders
- Soulcalibur II
- Spider-Man
- Spider-Man 2
- SpongeBob SquarePants: Battle for Bikini Bottom
- SpongeBob SquarePants: Lights, Camera, Pants!
- The SpongeBob SquarePants Movie
- Spyro: Enter the Dragonfly
- Spyro: A Hero's Tail
- Star Fox Adventures
- Star Fox: Assault
- Star Wars Rogue Squadron II: Rogue Leader
- Star Wars: The Clone Wars
- Super Mario Sunshine
- Super Monkey Ball
- Super Monkey Ball 2
- Super Monkey Ball 2-Pack
- Super Smash Bros. Melee
- Tales of Symphonia
- Tak and the Power of Juju
- TimeSplitters 2
- Tony Hawk's American Wasteland
- Tony Hawk's Pro Skater 4
- Tony Hawk's Underground
- Tony Hawk's Underground 2
- True Crime: Streets of LA
- Ultimate Spider-Man
- Viewtiful Joe
- Wario World
- WWE Day of Reckoning
- WWE Day of Reckoning 2
- WWE WrestleMania X8
- X-Men Legends
- Yu-Gi-Oh! The Falsebound Kingdom

PAL-exclusive Player's Choice games:

- Billy Hatcher and the Giant Egg
- Dragon Ball Z: Budokai 2
- FIFA Football 2003
- FIFA Football 2004
- FIFA Football 2005
- FIFA 06
- Mario Kart: Double Dash (Australia and New Zealand only)
- Mario Party 4
- Mario Party 5
- Prince of Persia Pack Limited Edition
- Prince of Persia: The Sands of Time
- Prince of Persia: Warrior Within
- Rayman 3: Hoodlum Havoc
- Star Wars Rogue Squadron III: Rebel Strike
- Tom Clancy's Splinter Cell
- Tom Clancy's Splinter Cell: Pandora Tomorrow
- Worms 3D (France)
- Turok: Evolution (France, Netherlands)
- XIII (France)

=== Nintendo 64 ===
Due to the use of a more expensive cartridge-based format, all N64 Player's Choice titles retailed for $39.95 in the United States and $49.99 in Canada.

Game	Release date	
Game	PAL	North America
1080° Snowboarding	1999	August 15, 1999
Banjo-Kazooie	1998	August 15, 1999
Cruis'n USA	Unknown if released	January 26, 1998
Diddy Kong Racing	Unknown if released	September 1, 1998
Donkey Kong 64	Unknown if released	December 26, 2000
F-1 World Grand Prix	April 23, 1999	Unreleased
F-Zero X	1999	Unreleased
GoldenEye 007	1998	September 1, 1998
Kobe Bryant in NBA Courtside	Unknown if released	September 1, 1998
The Legend of Zelda: Ocarina of Time	Unknown if released	August 15, 1999
Mario Kart 64	April 23, 1999	January 26, 1998; May 5, 1999
Perfect Dark	Unknown if released	December 26, 2000
Pokémon Snap	Unknown if released	December 26, 2000
Pokémon Stadium	Unknown if released	December 26, 2000
Snowboard Kids	April 23, 1999	Unreleased
Star Fox 64	April 23, 1999	January 26, 1998
Star Wars: Rogue Squadron	Unknown if released	August 15, 1999
Star Wars: Shadows of the Empire	Unknown if released	January 26, 1998
Super Mario 64	1998	January 26, 1998; May 5, 1999
Super Smash Bros.	Unknown if released	December 26, 2000
Turok: Dinosaur Hunter	Unknown if released	January 26, 1998
Turok 2: Seeds of Evil	Unknown if released	May 5, 1999
Wave Race 64	April 23, 1999	January 26, 1998
WCW vs. nWo: World Tour	Unknown if released	September 1, 1998
Yoshi's Story	Unknown if released	August 15, 1999

=== Super Nintendo Entertainment System ===
Game	Release date	
Game	PAL	North America
Asterix & Obelix	1997	Unreleased
Disney's Aladdin	1997	Unreleased
Donkey Kong Country	1996	October 1997
Donkey Kong Country 2: Diddy's Kong Quest	1998	June 15, 1998
Donkey Kong Country 3: Dixie Kong's Double Trouble!	1998	September 1, 1998
F-Zero	Unreleased	November 3, 1997
The Jungle Book	1997	Unreleased
The Legend of Zelda: A Link to the Past	1996	May 20, 1996
The Lion King	1997	Unreleased
Mario Paint	1997	October 1996
SimCity	1996	September 3, 1996
The Smurfs	1997	Unreleased
Star Fox	Unreleased	April 1997
Super Bomberman 2	1998	Unreleased
Super Mario All-Stars	1996	September 3, 1996
Super Mario Kart	1996	May 20, 1996
Super Mario World	1996	September 1, 1998
Super Mario World 2: Yoshi's Island	1998	Unreleased
Super Metroid	1996	September 2, 1997
Super Star Wars	Unreleased	November 1996
Super Street Fighter II	1996	Unreleased
Tetris & Dr. Mario	1996	September 2, 1997
Tetris 2	Unreleased	December 1996
Timon & Pumbaa's Jungle Games	1998	Unreleased

Satellaview-exclusive Player's Choice Classic SoundLink games:

- BS Zelda no Densetsu
- BS Sim City Machi Tsukuri Taikai Scenario 4 (ＢＳ ＳｉｍＣｉｔｙ 街作り大会 シナリオ４)
- BS Shin Onigashima (Dai 1 Wa) (ＢＳ新・鬼ヶ島(第１話))
- SatellaWalker: Satebô wo Sukui Dase!

== Handheld games ==
=== Nintendo 3DS ===
Game	Release date			
Game	Europe	North America	Australia	Japan (Note: In Japan, it is known as Happy Price Selection rather than Nintendo Selects.)
Ace Combat 3D: Cross Rumble +	Unreleased	Unreleased	Unreleased	June 1, 2017
Animal Crossing: New Leaf	June 29, 2018	August 26, 2016	July 21, 2018	March 17, 2016
Attack on Titan: Humanity in Chains	Unreleased	Unreleased	Unreleased	June 1, 2017
Disney Frozen: Olaf's Quest	Unreleased	June 6, 2016	Unreleased	Unreleased
Donkey Kong Country Returns 3D	June 29, 2018	March 11, 2016	May 11, 2017	September 15, 2016
DoraEigo: Nobita to Yōsei no Fushigi Collection	Unreleased	Unreleased	Unreleased	March 17, 2016
Fire Emblem Awakening	Unreleased	Unreleased	Unreleased	September 15, 2016
Gotouchi Tetsudou: Gotouchi Chara to Nihon Zenkoku no Tabi	Unreleased	Unreleased	Unreleased	March 17, 2016
Harvest Moon 3D: A New Beginning	Unreleased	Unreleased	Unreleased	March 17, 2016
Kirby: Triple Deluxe	October 13, 2017	February 6, 2017	May 11, 2018	Unreleased
The Legend of Zelda: A Link Between Worlds	October 16, 2015	February 3, 2018	Unreleased	Unreleased
The Legend of Zelda: Majora's Mask 3D	Unreleased	February 4, 2019	Unreleased	Unreleased
The Legend of Zelda: Ocarina of Time 3D	June 24, 2016	March 11, 2016	May 11, 2018	September 15, 2016
Lego City Undercover: The Chase Begins	June 24, 2016	August 26, 2016	Unreleased	September 15, 2016
Luigi's Mansion: Dark Moon	October 13, 2017	August 26, 2016	May 11, 2017	March 17, 2016
Mario & Luigi: Dream Team	June 24, 2016	February 6, 2017	May 11, 2017	Unreleased
Mario Party: Island Tour	October 16, 2015	March 11, 2016	May 26, 2016	Unreleased
Mario Tennis Open	October 16, 2015	Unreleased	May 26, 2016	September 15, 2016
Monster Hunter XX	Unreleased	Unreleased	Unreleased	November 30, 2017
Nintendogs + Cats	October 16, 2015	August 26, 2016	May 26, 2016	March 17, 2016
Paper Mario: Sticker Star	June 24, 2016	Unreleased	May 11, 2017	Unreleased
Puyo Puyo Chronicle	Unreleased	Unreleased	Unreleased	June 28, 2018
Ridge Racer 3D	Unreleased	Unreleased	Unreleased	June 1, 2017
Rune Factory 4	Unreleased	Unreleased	Unreleased	October 26, 2017
Super Mario 3D Land	October 13, 2017	February 3, 2018	May 11, 2018	Unreleased
Star Fox 64 3D	October 16, 2015	February 4, 2019	May 26, 2016	Unreleased
Style Savvy: Trendsetters	June 24, 2016	Unreleased	Unreleased	Unreleased
Sumikko Gurashi: Koko ga Ochitsukundesu	Unreleased	Unreleased	Unreleased	March 17, 2016
Super Mario Maker for Nintendo 3DS	June 29, 2018	February 4, 2019	November 2, 2018	Unreleased
Taiko no Tatsujin: Chibi Dragon to Fushigi na Orb	Unreleased	Unreleased	Unreleased	March 17, 2016
Tales of the Abyss	Unreleased	Unreleased	Unreleased	June 1, 2017
Teddy Together	Unreleased	Unreleased	Unreleased	March 17, 2016
Tomodachi Life	Unreleased	August 26, 2016	November 2, 2018	March 17, 2016
Ultimate NES Remix	Unreleased	February 3, 2018	Unreleased	Unreleased
Yoshi's New Island	October 16, 2015	March 11, 2016	May 26, 2016	Unreleased

=== Game Boy Advance ===
Game	Release date	
Game	North America	Japan
Family Tennis Advance	Unreleased	February 2, 2006
Golden Sun	Unreleased	February 2, 2006
Golden Sun: The Lost Age	Unreleased	February 2, 2006
Kotoba no Puzzle: Mojipittan Advance	Unreleased	February 2, 2006
The Legend of Zelda: A Link to the Past/Four Swords	September 25, 2006	Unreleased
Magical Vacation	Unreleased	February 2, 2006
Mario & Luigi: Superstar Saga	April 6, 2006	Unreleased
Mario Kart: Super Circuit	September 25, 2006	Unreleased
Mother 1 + 2	Unreleased	February 2, 2006
Mr. Driller Ace: Fushgi na Pactelia	Unreleased	February 2, 2006
Namco Museum	Unreleased	February 2, 2006
Oriental Blue: Ao no Tengai	Unreleased	February 2, 2006
Pac-Man Collection	Unreleased	February 2, 2006
Pokémon FireRed	September 25, 2006	Unreleased
Pokémon LeafGreen	September 25, 2006	Unreleased
Shining Soul	Unreleased	February 2, 2006
Shining Soul II	Unreleased	February 2, 2006
Summon Night: Swordcraft Story	Unreleased	February 2, 2006
Summon Night: Swordcraft Story 2	Unreleased	February 2, 2006
Super Mario Advance	April 2, 2006	Unreleased
Super Mario World: Super Mario Advance 2	April 2, 2006	Unreleased
Tactics Ogre: The Knight of Lodis	Unreleased	February 2, 2006
Yoshi's Island: Super Mario Advance 3	April 2, 2006	Unreleased

=== Game Boy ===
- The Bugs Bunny Crazy Castle (February 9, 1998)
- The Bugs Bunny Crazy Castle 2 (September 3, 1996)
- Donkey Kong (September 3, 1996)
- Donkey Kong Land (September 2, 1997)
- Donkey Kong Land 2 (June 1, 1998)
- DuckTales 2 (October 12, 1998)
- Dr. Mario (September 2, 1997)
- F-1 Race (May 18, 1998)
- Golf (February 9, 1998)
- James Bond 007 (August 31, 1998)
- Kirby's Dream Land (November 1997)
- Kirby's Dream Land 2 (June 1, 1998)
- Kirby's Pinball Land (November 1996)
- The Legend of Zelda: Link's Awakening (March 1997)
- The Little Mermaid (November 3, 1997)
- Mega Man: Dr. Wily's Revenge (September 3, 1996)
- Mega Man II (February 9, 1998)
- Metroid II: Return of Samus (September 2, 1997)
- Mickey's Dangerous Chase (November 3, 1997)
- Mickey Mouse: Magic Wands! (May 18, 1998)
- The Smurfs (October 12, 1998)
- Space Invaders (December 1996)
- Star Wars (November 1996)
- Street Fighter II (August 31, 1998)
- Super Mario Land (October 1996)
- Super Mario Land 2: 6 Golden Coins (September 3, 1996)
- Super R.C. Pro-Am (June 1, 1998)
- Tennis (May 18, 1998)
- Tetris (March 1997)
- Wario Land: Super Mario Land 3 (September 3, 1996)
- Wave Race (February 9, 1998)
