= P. P. Hammer and his Pneumatic Weapon =

1991 video game

- Developer: Traveling Bits
- Publisher: Demonware
- Platforms: Amiga, Commodore 64
- Release: 1991
- Genre: Puzzle-platform

P. P. Hammer and his Pneumatic Weapon is a 1991 puzzle-platform game for the Amiga and Commodore 64 developed by Traveling Bits. It was influenced by Lode Runner (1983). The player controls a character called P. P. Hammer, who is on a quest to discover and acquire all treasures from a series of more than 60 levels.

== Gameplay ==
These levels are divided into four graphical themes: Ancient Rome, Ancient Egypt, medieval castles, and ice. A fifth theme, LegoLand, appears on bonus levels.

Each level in the game is made up of rectangular blocks, and contains various things including treasures, enemies, locked doors, bonus items and traps. P. P. Hammer carries a jackhammer, which allows him to drill through a block he's standing next to. As in Lode Runner, drilling through more than one layer of blocks requires creating a triangle-shaped cavity more than one block wide, and blocks reappear after a short while. A block reappearing on top of P. P. Hammer kills him.

P. P. Hammer can collect treasures and various power-up potions lying around the level. When he has collected all the treasures, the exit door opens, and going through the exit door completes the level. After each level, a password is displayed, allowing the player to continue from that point at a later time.

== Easter egg ==
The C64 version has an easter egg: sometimes after returning to the main menu, the 1983 hit song Garden Party from the band Mezzoforte is played instead of the game's original music. This song is also used as the initial loading tune for the tape version of the game.

== Legacy ==
In 1993, Kemco released the fourth entry of their Crazy Castle series on the Game Boy as The Real Ghostbusters in the US and Garfield's Labyrinth in Europe. The game is a direct lift of P.P. Hammer and his Pneumatic Weapon, featuring simplified sprites and near-identical level designs. According to the developer of P.P. Hammer, the port is entirely unauthorized.

== See also ==
- Crazy Castle
