= Cisco Heat =

1990 video game

- North American flyer
- Developers: Jaleco; Home computers ICE Software
- Publishers: Jaleco; Home computers Image Works
- Platforms: Arcade, Amiga, Amstrad CPC, Atari ST, Commodore 64, MS-DOS, ZX Spectrum
- Release: JP: October 1990; WW: November 1990
- Genre: Racing
- Modes: Single-player, multiplayer

Cisco Heat: All American Police Car Race (Note: Japanese: シスコ ヒート, Hepburn: Shisuko Hīto) is a 1990 racing video game developed and published in arcades by Jaleco. Players control a police squad car racing against computer-controlled vehicles. The goal is to finish each race in first place. Players can take different routes to bypass certain portions of the course. Three cabinet types were created, a standard upright, a sit-down, and a motion-based "deluxe" machine; both of these could be connected, or "linked", together to enable multiplayer.

Cisco Heat was designed by many former employees of Sega, who had left the company to form BitBox, which developed Jaleco Rally: Big Run. After Jaleco absorbed the company, the team began work on a spiritual successor to Big Run, which became Cisco Heat. The game was ported to the Atari ST, Commodore 64, Amiga, ZX Spectrum, Amstrad CPC, and MS-DOS, all of which were published in Europe by Image Works. The arcade version of Cisco Heat was praised for its gameplay, presentation and controls, with one reviewer finding it to be a drastic improvement over Jaleco's previous arcade games. Home computer ports were met with a more negative reception for their poor quality.

== Gameplay ==
Arcade version screenshot

In Cisco Heat, players control a police squad car through San Francisco in an attempt to win the "National Championship Police Car Steeplechase" in first place. Gameplay is similar to Out Run and Chase H.Q., where players must race against computer-controlled vehicles to the end of each section, taking place in a different area of San Francisco. Sections contain famous landmarks from the city, namely the Golden Gate Bridge, Alcatraz and tram cars, as well as several features such as steep dives, 90-degree turns and multiple selectable routes, which can allow players to bypass certain portions of the race and shortcut to another area. Players can select from two different police cars, both of which are based on the Cadillac Brougham and Nissan 300ZX Z32 respectively. Up to four Cisco Heat cabinets can be connected, or "linked", together to enable multiplayer play.

== Development ==
Cisco Heat was developed and published by Jaleco, originally released in October 1990 in Japan. It was released in North America and Europe in November 1990. Most of the development staff who worked on the game were former members of Sega, who left the company to form the short-lived developer Bit Box, which created Jaleco Rally: Big Run (1989). After Jaleco absorbed the company in 1990, the development team became part of Jaleco and worked on a successor to Big Run, which later became Cisco Heat. For this reason, Cisco Heat bears several similarities to Big Run, and was even marketed as a conversion kit for older Big Run arcade units. In January 1991, Cisco Heat was exhibited at the Amusement Trades Exhibition International expo in the United Kingdom.

Three different cabinet types were produced for the game: standard upright, sit-down, and a "deluxe" unit with minor motion capabilities.

The soundtrack was composed by Yasuhiko Takashiba.

== Ports ==
Home computer ports of Cisco Heat were done by UK-based developers ICE Software and Moonstone Computing. Versions for the Atari ST, Commodore 64, Amiga, MS-DOS, Amstrad CPC, and ZX Spectrum were published by Image Works.

An Atari Jaguar version of Cisco Heat was announced in 1994, but never released.

== Reception ==
Reception

Review scores
Publication	Score		
Publication	Amiga	Arcade	C64
Amiga Format	59%		
Sinclair User		94%	
Zzap!64			30%
Commodore Format			12%
CU Amiga		93%	
Power Play	35%		
The One		Positive	

In Japan, Cisco Heat was the tenth highest-grossing dedicated arcade game of 1991. In North America, it was the top-grossing new video game on the RePlay arcade charts in January 1991.

The arcade version of Cisco Heat was met with a positive reception from critics. Sinclair User compared it to Out Run and Chase H.Q. for their similar gameplay, saying that its impressive atmosphere, fast-paced action and generally well-made presentation made Cisco Heat "one hell of a driving game". CU Amiga felt the same, and claimed that it was one of the better arcade games produced by Jaleco, and showed that they had the resources to produce a well-designed racer after Big Run. They labeled it as a "stunner" for its presentation, gameplay and fast-paced action, alongside its responsive controls and colorful visuals. The One called it "an urban Chase H.Q." for its similar gameplay and aesthetic, commending its multiplayer mode and cabinet linking system.

The home computer ports were met with a far-less positive fanfare. Reviewing the Amiga version, Amiga Action criticized the controls for being sensitive, the scrolling for being jerky, and the graphics for being poorly-made. They felt the game had a "rather amateurish" theme to it in regards to its presentation and overall quality, further criticizing it for being a generally unimpressive game. German publication Power Play had a similar response, adding that the game lacked originality compared to other similar games for the system and for its 3D effects being of poor quality. The Commodore 64 version received a record-low score of 12% by Commodore Format, who labeled it one of the worst games of 1991; they lambasted nearly every aspect of the game, greatly disliking its presentation, jerky scrolling, bad framerate and large amount of glitches, with the only positive not being directly related to the game with the reviewer Colin Campbell citing "It comes in a nice box". ZZap!64 shared many of the same criticisms, further disliking its lack of difficulty and bland music. In light of their criticism, they liked the port's short load times, which were only at the beginning of the game.
