= Gravity (video game) =

1990 video game

- Publisher(s): Image Works
- Designer(s): Ross Goodley
- Platform(s): Amiga, Atari ST
- Release: EU: 1990
- Genre(s): Action, Strategy
- Mode(s): Single-player

Gravity is an isometric game for the Amiga and Atari ST published by Image Works in 1991. It combines action and strategy elements in a science fiction setting.
