= Hydra (video game) =

1990 video game

- North American arcade flyer
- Developer: Atari Games (Note: Amiga, Atari ST, and Commodore 64 versions developed by ICE Software; Amstrad CPC and ZX Spectrum versions developed by Moonstone Computing; Atari Lynx version developed by NuFX.)
- Publisher: Atari Games: Home computers Domark Limited Tengen Lynx Atari Corporation
- Producer: Milt Loper
- Programmers: Dennis Harper; Andrew Burgess
- Artists: Chuck Eyler; Deborah Short; Nick Stern
- Composers: Brad Fuller; Don Diekneite
- Platforms: Arcade, Amiga, Amstrad CPC, Atari ST, Commodore 64, ZX Spectrum, Atari Lynx
- Release: Arcade: NA: June 1990; Home computers: UK: May 1991; Lynx: NA: 1992; EU: 1992
- Genre: Vehicular combat
- Mode: Single-player
- Arcade system: Atari G1

Hydra is a 1990 vehicular combat video game developed and published by Atari Games for arcades. The player pilots a hovercraft, trying to deliver top secret items while avoiding mines, other hovercraft, and logs. The player can collect money and fuel and the game uses X-Y yoke control.

== Gameplay ==
Arcade screenshot

In Hydra, thieves are trying to steal the treasures from a museum which contain secrets to a weapon, and it is up to the player to stop them. The player is issued an experimental speedboat to navigate the rivers and retrieve the treasures from checkpoints. There are nine levels of rivers and oceans. While playing the game, the player can collect money bags for extra cash and crystals for extra fuel. The obstacles are gun embankments, enemy crafts and other nuisances that will slow the player down and may cause the cargo to be dropped and float downstream which will need to be retrieved. At the end of each level, the player drops off the cargo and can buy upgrades from a shop to improve the Hydra speedboat.

== Development and release ==
In May 1991, the game received its first home conversions for the Amiga, Amstrad CPC, Atari ST, Commodore 64 and ZX Spectrum. The Amiga, Atari ST, and C64 versions were developed by ICE Software, while the CPC and ZX Spectrum versions were developed by Moonstone Interactive; all home computer versions were published by Atari's console port division Tengen in association with Domark Limited. The Atari Lynx version was developed by NuFX and published by Atari Corporation in 1992.

== Reception ==
Robert Jung reviewed the Atari Lynx version of the game which has been published on IGN. He went on to say the game borrowed "heavily from RoadBlasters", but he found it fun and gave a score of 8 out of 10. Game Zero Magazine reviewed the game and gave a score of 82 out of 100.
