= Interphase (video game) =

1989 video game

- Developer: The Assembly Line
- Publisher: Image Works
- Designers: Dean Lester; Danny Emmett
- Programmer: Adrian Stephens
- Platforms: Amiga, Atari ST, MS-DOS
- Release: 1989
- Genres: First-person shooter, puzzle
- Mode: Single-player

Interphase is a video game developed by The Assembly Line and published by in 1989 Image Works for the Amiga, Atari ST, and MS-DOS. It is a first-person shooter with an emphasis on puzzle-solving using the interaction between a 3D cyberpunk environment and its relationship with a 2D zoomable blueprint in which a non-player character is indirectly guided through the floors of a high-security building. The developers licensed concepts from William Gibson's novel Neuromancer.

== Plot ==
In the future, automation of most jobs has led to boredom, which in turn has led to a boom in the leisure industry. DreamTracks, created by Dreamers who work for multi-national corporations, are recorded patterns of imagination. The general public then view these DreamTracks as a form of entertainment.

The player, Chad a Dreamer discovers that subliminal messages are being inserted into DreamTracks to persuade consumers to buy certain products and more worryingly, to push certain political viewpoints and pro-government propaganda.

Using a human to computer interface, known as an Interphase, Chad sets out to destroy a particularly dangerous DreamTrack stored in a high security building. He has asked his girlfriend, Kaf-E to physically break into the building while he virtually infiltrates the computer to disable computer controlled defences and security systems.

== Gameplay ==
Atari ST screenshot

The action takes place in two modes: a 3D cyberpunk environment and a 2D schematic map where puzzles are encountered. 3D objects in the cyberpunk environment represent objects such as security doors and cameras. To disable the real-world devices, the 3D objects must be destroyed. Puzzle-solving involves determining which objects to disable and in what order. The player must also deal with virtual defences, represented by enemy ships which pose a threat to the player's ability to jack in to the system, and which must be defeated.

The 2D environment is a polygon-based schematic closely resembling an animated blueprint. A very deep zoom-in is possible and necessary. The progress of Kaf-E and the positions of moving objects (e.g., security guards) and fixed objects such as cameras can all be monitored in this view. While viewing the 2D schematic, the action in the 3D world continues, so it's essential that enemy ships have been dispensed with before puzzle-solving can proceed.

The player controls Chad in the 3D section of the game while in the 2D section Kaf-E follows a path throughout the building and attempts to reach the lift to the next level, messaging Chad if she encounters an obstacle or notices something that could assist. The player's main goal is to disable/manipulate the real world objects and security to allow Kaf-E to progress safely without getting killed by traps or caught by the security bots, as well as ensuring his virtual craft is not destroyed by the defenses. Allowing either his own craft to be destroyed or Kaf-E's safety compromised will result in a game over.

The 3D environment is a first-person view from the front of a virtual ship navigating a multiple-level environment. The virtual levels do not represent the floors of the building, they simply represent parts of the computer system. Navigation between levels is accomplished by flying through square panels.

== Reception ==
The game was ranked the 38th best game of all time by Amiga Power.

== See also ==
- Neuromancer (video game)
