= Sid Meier's Antietam! =

1999 video game

- Developers: Firaxis Games; BreakAway Games
- Publisher: Firaxis Games
- Designer: Sid Meier
- Programmer: Andy House
- Artists: Dwight Eppinger; Bob Rickert
- Platform: Microsoft Windows
- Release: NA: December 13, 1999
- Genre: Computer wargame
- Modes: Single-player, multiplayer

Sid Meier's Antietam! is a real-time computer wargame designed by Sid Meier, the co-founder of Firaxis Games, then released in December 1999. It is the prequel to the 1997 Sid Meier's Gettysburg!.

== Gameplay ==
The game allows the player to control either the Confederate or Union troops during the Battle of Antietam of the American Civil War. It can be played as a single scenario, or as a campaign of linked scenarios, either recounting the original history or exploring alternate possibilities.

== Development ==
The game was not released through retail stores. The staff of Computer Gaming World summarized it as "a grand experiment by Firaxis to test the popularity of online-only distribution for commercial releases."

== Reception ==
Reception

Aggregate score
Aggregator	Score
Metacritic	82/100

Review scores
Publication	Score
Computer Games Strategy Plus	4/5
Computer Gaming World	4.5/5
EP Daily	7/10
Eurogamer	7/10
GamePro	4/5
GameSpot	8.5/10
IGN	8.8/10
PC Accelerator	8/10
PC Gamer (UK)	49%
PC Gamer (US)	75%

Antietam! received "favorable" reviews according to the review aggregation website Metacritic.

The game was a runner-up for Computer Games Strategy Plus' 1999 "Wargame of the Year" award. The staff wrote, "Another battle, another victory for this thoroughly entertaining wargame 'for the masses.'" Conversely, the staff of Computer Gaming World named it the best wargame game of 1999. They wrote, "Antietam is the epitome of a Sid Meier design: intensely absorbing and wickedly punishing."

== See also ==
- Battle of Antietam (video game)
