= The Bombing Islands =

1997 video game

- The Bombing Islands cover art (North American, PlayStation version)
- Developers: Kemco; Realtime Associates (N64)
- Publisher: Kemco (Note: Nintendo 64 version co-published by Vatical Entertainment.)
- Series: Kid Klown
- Platforms: PlayStation, Nintendo 64
- Release: PlayStation: JP: July 18, 1997; EU: 2000; NA: May 1, 2001; Nintendo 64: NA: April 2, 1999; EU: June 18, 1999; PlayStation Network: JP: July 6, 2011
- Genre: Puzzle
- Modes: Single-player, multiplayer

The Bombing Islands (Note: Japanese: ボンビンアイランド キッドクラウンのクレイジーパズル, Hepburn: Bonbin Airendo Kido Kuraun no Kreiji Pazuru; lit. The Bombing Islands: Kid Klown's Craze Puzzle) is a puzzle video game developed and published by Kemco for the PlayStation. It was later re-released for Nintendo 64 as Charlie Blast's Territory (whose working title was Charlie Blast's Challenge) in 1999 in North America on April 2, and in Europe on June 18. A cell phone game named "The Bombing Island" was also released in 2003 by Kemco, but with graphics from the game Bombuzal with the main character changed to Kid Clown.

== Gameplay ==
The player controls the game's main protagonist and is tasked to demolish a series of bombs located on 60 islands, taking place across six different environments. He must use these bombs and other things located on each island to help him clear the bombs so he can proceed to the next island. An island has a single red detonator bomb, which must be grouped alongside other bombs in the level by pushing the bombs (excluding ones planted in the ground) before lighting the detonator bomb, which allows for all the bombs to explode and destroy the island. If the player is either caught in an explosion or fails to remove all the bombs in the level, they are forced to retry the level from the start. As the player advances, additional hazards are added to make the game more challenging, such as moving platforms, spikes coming through the ground, and slippery surfaces that prevent him from pushing bombs across. After each island is cleared the player has given a password which consists of five playing cards.

== Story and other differences in the versions ==
In the PlayStation versions of the game, the main character is Kid Clown, from the earlier Kid Klown series of video games. He is given a message from the King Clown to rid the planet of the bombs on all six continents.

In the Nintendo 64 (N64) version, the hero is Charlie Blast, a demolition expert. His job is to clear the six rivers that have been dammed by the evil 'King of Industry'.

PlayStation version	Nintendo 64 version

The play mechanics for both games are almost identical, but in Bombing Islands there is a step meter counting each step and move that Kid Clown makes. This earns the player Gold, Silver, Bronze or no medal. The N64 version doesn't have this step counting requirement, but Charlie can jump without having to step on spikes to do so, while Kid Clown only jumps when having stepped on spikes. Some of the sixty levels in the game are the same from one version to the next, but the graphics to both are completely different, even though the obstacles serve the same purpose with both versions.

== Charlie Blast's Territory ==
Charlie Blast's Territory (North American N64 version)

The game was independently re-developed for the Nintendo 64 by Realtime Associates and game designer Scott Kim. In the early days of the games production it was titled "Charlie Blast's Challenge". Besides changing the graphics, a four-player versus mode was also added wherein players can control Charlie or one of three other characters and must conquer as much of the land as possible with one's own bomb blasts. The multiplayer mode includes several bombs not featured in the main solo mode, like a freeze bomb, which when lit, will encase the other player(s) in blocks of ice, and a rainbow bomb, which is capable of exploding an entire row or column that the bomb is facing.

== Reception ==
Reception

Aggregate score
Aggregator	Score	
Aggregator	N64	PS
GameRankings	57%	34%

Review scores
Publication	Score	
Publication	N64	PS
AllGame	N/A	2.5/5
CNET Gamecenter	4/10	N/A
Electronic Gaming Monthly	5/10, 6.5/10, 5.5/10, 4/10	N/A
Famitsu	N/A	21/40
Game Informer	3/10	N/A
GameSpot	4.8/10	N/A
IGN	6.9/10	N/A
N64 Magazine	52%	N/A
Nintendo Power	6.3/10	N/A
Official U.S. PlayStation Magazine	N/A	2.5/5

Charlie Blast's Territory received mixed reviews, while The Bombing Islands received unfavorable reviews, according to the review aggregation website GameRankings. GameSpot criticized the graphics and the sound of the former version, and called it a decent puzzle game in a substandard package. IGN rated the game higher, and recommended it for hardcore puzzle gamers. GamePro also noted the lackluster presentation. (Note: GamePro gave the Nintendo 64 version 3.5/5 for graphics, two 2/5 scores for sound and fun factor, and 3/5 for control.) Nintendo Power gave Charlie's Blast Territory a mixed review, a few months before the game was released Stateside. In Japan, Famitsu gave The Bombing Islands a score of 21 out of 40.
