= Kid Klown in Night Mayor World =

1992 video game

Mickey Mouse 3
- North American cover art
- Developer: Kemco
- Publisher: Kemco
- Programmers: Fumio Tono; K. Kamigaki; S. Murakami; K. Tanaka
- Artists: Kiminari Sueda; T. Sunahori; A. Maeda; E. Otsuka; Y. Shintaku
- Writer: Syouko Hirahara
- Composers: M. Takenaka; Hiroyuki Masuno
- Series: Crazy Castle
- Platform: Nintendo Entertainment System
- Release: JP: September 30, 1992; NA: April 1993
- Genre: Platformer
- Mode: Single-player

Kid Klown in Night Mayor World is a platform video game for the NES published by Kemco on April 1, 1993 and was the first game in the Kid Klown series. It was a reskin of Mickey Mouse III: Yume Fuusen (ミッキーマウスIII 夢ふうせん; "Mickey Mouse III: Balloon Dreams"), a licensed platform video game starring Mickey Mouse that was only released in Japan. Released as part of the Crazy Castle series, Mickey Mouse III was released on September 30, 1992 by Kemco in Japan for the Family Computer.

Other games in the Kid Klown series include Kid Klown in Crazy Chase for the Super NES (later released for the Game Boy Advance as Crazy Chase), the Japan-exclusive Kid Klown in Crazy Chase 2: Love Love Hani Soudatsusen for PlayStation, Soreike! Kid: Go! Go! Kid for the Game Boy (later re-released for the Game Boy Color as Bugs Bunny: Crazy Castle 3) and The Bombing Islands for the PlayStation (also ported to the Nintendo 64 as Charlie Blast's Territory).

Mickey Mouse III was followed by a sequel, Mickey Mouse IV: The Magical Labyrinth.

== Plot ==
=== Mickey Mouse III: Balloon Dreams ===
Mickey Mouse is working part-time selling balloons in order to buy a present for Minnie, whose birthday is a few days away. He gets news from Pluto that Minnie cannot wake up. He sets off to visit her, only to find that she has been trapped in a nightmare. Now, Mickey must journey into Minnie's mind in order to free her from the nightmare.

=== Kid Klown in Night Mayor World ===
Kid Klown and his family are on their way to perform in a circus when they meet the magician Night Mayor (a pun on "nightmare"). He asks Kid Klown to help him open a treasure vault, but Kid Klown, having been warned about the evil magician by his parents, refuses. Not willing to give up so easily, Night Mayor kidnaps Kid Klown's family and dares him to follow him into his world if he ever wants to see his family again.

== Gameplay ==
The player character, Mickey Mouse/Kid Klown, carries balloons with which he can attack, jump higher, or float. Including the introduction level, there are seven interesting levels throughout the game, each with its own unique theme. At the very end of each level, there is a bonus stage. The player is able to collect extra lives and extra energy in the bonus stage.

The stage select screen in the original game features the song "It's a Small World" in the original; it was changed in the American release. In the original, the boss in the first stage is one of the vultures from The Jungle Book, while the Kid Klown version features an owl. The third stage (based on the folk tale Jack & the Beanstalk) has Rumplewald the giant from the cartoon Giantland as the end boss; the American version replaces him with a cyclops. The Horned King from The Black Cauldron is the final boss in the original; Night Mayor is the final boss in the Kid Klown game.
