= Back to the Future Part II (video game) =

1990 video game

- Developer: Image Works
- Publisher: Image Works
- Composers: Alan Silvestri; David Whittaker
- Series: Back to the Future
- Platforms: Amiga; Amstrad CPC; Atari ST; Commodore 64; MS-DOS; Master System; ZX Spectrum
- Release: 1990
- Genre: Action
- Mode: Single-player

Back to the Future Part II is a 1990 action game based on the 1989 film of the same name. It was developed and published by Image Works for Amiga, Amstrad CPC, Atari ST, Commodore 64, MS-DOS, Master System, and ZX Spectrum. The game has five levels based on scenes from the film, and was criticized as a poor conversion of the film. It was followed by Back to the Future Part III.

== Gameplay ==
Back to the Future Part II features five levels based on scenes from the film. Marty McFly, his girlfriend Jennifer Parker, and Emmett "Doc" Brown time-travel from 1985 to 2015, to prevent the couple's future children from turning out badly. The game includes an introduction sequence that depicts the DeLorean time machine as it travels to 2015. The first level is a side-scroller in which Marty uses a hoverboard around Hill Valley and must avoid oncoming vehicles while evading Griff and his gang. The second level is played as a puzzle game in which Jennifer has wound up at the house where her future self resides. Playing from an overhead perspective, the player must guide Jennifer out of the house while preventing her from seeing her future self or her future family members.

The third level is a side-scrolling beat 'em up in which Marty returns to 1985 and discovers that Hill Valley has changed due to an alteration in the timeline: in 1955, Biff Tannen, through his future self, obtained a sports almanac from 2015 and used it to become a millionaire through sports betting. Marty fights Biff's guards while walking through Hill Valley. The fourth level is a sliding puzzle game, in which tiles must be arranged to form a picture of Marty playing in a band (a scene from the first and second film). Marty and Doc then go to 1955 to restore the original version of 1985. In the final level, similar to the first one, Marty hoverboards through 1955 Hill Valley to avoid Biff's crew while trying to obtain the almanac from Biff's car. The story is continued in Back to the Future Part III.

== Development and release ==
U.K. company Image Works developed and published the game. For the fourth level, the programmers had initially intended to create a level that would somehow use the sandbags featured in the film's band scene. As the team was unable to devise a purpose for the sandbags, they ultimately chose to create the level as a sliding puzzle game instead.

Back to the Future Part II was released in the U.K. in 1990, for Amiga, Amstrad CPC, Atari ST, Commodore 64, and ZX Spectrum. In the U.S., Konami published a version for IBM PC compatibles in early 1991. A Master System version was released in the U.K. later that year.

== Reception ==
Reception

Review scores
Publication	Score
Crash	57% (ZX Spectrum)
Computer and Video Games	67% (Atari ST)
Sinclair User	59% (ZX Spectrum)
Your Sinclair	79/100 (ZX Spectrum)
Zzap!64	59% (C64); 64% (Amiga)
The Age	75% (C64)
Amiga Action	57% (Amiga)
Atari ST User	65% (Atari ST)
Commodore Format	59% (C64)
CU Amiga	59% (Amiga)
The Games Machine	75% (Atari ST)
Mean Machines	37% (Master System)
Sega Force	64% (Master System)
ST Format	62% (Atari ST)

Back to the Future Part II was criticized as a poor conversion of the film. Mark Patterson of CU Amiga wrote: "There's so many crossover plots in the film it seems almost impossible for a game to do it justice. [...] Obviously it was always going to be a difficult license to translate; I just wonder if anybody could have handled it in a more exciting manner". The introduction sequence was praised by some reviewers, although Robert Swan of Computer and Video Games (CVG), reviewing the Atari ST version, stated that the sequence was a nice idea that was poorly executed, writing that the DeLorean "jerks along like a slug with bunions". Chris Jenkins of Sinclair User reviewed the ZX Spectrum version and considered the sequence to be "astonishingly badly-drawn".

The game's music and sound were mostly praised; Patterson considered the rendition of the film's theme music to be among the game's two outstanding features along with the introduction sequence. The character sprites were criticized, especially the design of Marty McFly. Some critics felt that the hoverboarding levels went on too long.

Patterson believed that the beat 'em up level was poorly executed and the worst of the five levels. He also wondered why the fourth level would take the form of a tile puzzle game, questioning its relevance to the scene it depicts. In addition, Patterson believed that the second level was too easy and quick, and was critical of the final level is similar to the first: "It's a bit of a cheap gimmick to rehash an earlier game section so blatantly. I was very disappointed to get this far and discover I really had gone back to the future". Gerard Ryle of The Age wrote about the game's various levels: "Pretty weird stuff I admit, but this game's real strength lies in its reliance on a combination of quick reflexes and quick mind".

Amiga Action criticized the music and the "weak" background details. Zzap!64 considered the levels to be slightly better on the Amiga version over the Commodore 64 version. Commodore Format criticized the "unoriginal" levels, but praised the sound, calling it the most pleasing aspect of the game. The magazine stated that the game's lasting appeal, beyond a few days, "is extremely questionable", and wrote that the game's "dozens of nice touches" only serve to "remind you that the game as a whole is full of unfulfilled promise".

Mark Caswell of The Games Machine reviewed the Atari ST version and considered it a disappointing game, criticizing its slow pace. However, Caswell believed that most of the graphics were fairly good. CVG's Swan believed that the puzzle levels did not fit in well with the rest of the game, and stated that the game "isn't a total disaster" but "you do get the feeling that a lot more could have been made from it". Atari ST User opined that the game closely follows the film but considered it as average movie tie-in. The magazine praised the colorful graphics, but criticized the poor scrolling and monotonous gameplay, and concluded that the game did not have lasting appeal as its different gameplay styles provide only initial excitement.

Neil Jackson of ST Format called it a "colourful and somewhat schizophrenic game" with an "interesting" combination of gameplay styles and "superb" graphics. However, Jackson criticized the first level as being "incredibly tough" due to poor collision detection and joystick control. However, he praised the puzzle levels for providing "well-needed breathing space" between the action levels. Jackson concluded that while the game "is not what it could have been, there should be something in it for everybody - if you can just get far enough to reach it!"

Rich Pelley of Your Sinclair reviewed the ZX Spectrum version and was critical of the game's long loading times, but praised the variety and the puzzle levels, and considered the game to be addictive and very faithful to the film. Reviewers for Crash were disappointed with the gameplay. Mean Machines reviewed the Master System version and was critical of the graphics, poor controls, and poor collision detection, while stating that the levels were either too easy or too difficult. Sega Force called it frustrating and considered its graphics mediocre, both especially during the first level, although praise was given for the visual appearance of the puzzle levels.
