= Special Criminal Investigation =

1989 video game

- North American arcade flyer
- Developer: Taito (Note: Home computer versions developed by ICE Software; Master System version developed by Natsume Co., Ltd.)
- Publishers: Taito: Arcade; JP/NA: Taito; EU: Electrocoin Home computers Ocean Software
- Series: Chase H.Q.
- Platforms: Arcade, Amiga, Atari ST, ZX Spectrum, Amstrad CPC, Commodore 64, PC Engine, Master System, Sega Saturn
- Release: October 1989: Arcade; JP: October 1989; NA: December 1989 Amiga, Atari ST; EU: August 1990 ZX Spectrum; EU: November 1990 C64, CPC; EU: 1990 PC Engine; JP: January 25, 1991 Master System; PAL: October 15, 1992 Saturn; JP: 9 August 1996
- Genre: Racing
- Mode: Single-player
- Arcade system: Taito Z System

Special Criminal Investigation, also known as S.C.I. for short or as Chase HQ II: Special Criminal Investigation in some home versions, is a 1989 vehicular combat racing game developed and published by Taito for arcades. It is the sequel to the 1988 game Chase H.Q.

== Gameplay ==
Instead of the black Porsche 928 of the first game, the player commands a red example of the just-introduced (at the time) Nissan 300ZX Z32 T-Top Turbo. Unlike the first game, the player is able to fire at offending vehicles, with some cabinets containing buttons on the steering wheel, and others having a fire button on the gearshift, along with a button to activate the nitrous boost.

The game brings back protagonists Tony Gibson and Det. Raymond Broady of the first game, and their second game appearance. Broady has taken over the driver's seat this time, while Gibson, as the passenger, serves as the gunman. Also, instead of Nancy, Karen is the officer delivering reports of whom the criminal is pursuing, and what they are driving.

== Ports ==
European Master System cover

Conversions for Amiga, Atari ST, Commodore 64, and ZX Spectrum were released in 1990 by Ocean Software, developed by Glasgow's ICE Software. A conversion for the PC Engine (TurboGrafx-16) was released exclusively in Japan by Taito on January 25, 1991. Natsume Co., Ltd. ported it to the Master System in 1992. An Amstrad plus/GX4000 version was written but never released, and only a small number of cartridges are known to exist.

In 1996, Taito released an emulation of the arcade original for the Sega Saturn in Japan, bundled together with Chase H.Q. on one disc.

== Reception ==
Contemporary reception
Review scores
Publication	Scores					
Publication	Arcade	Amiga	ST	C64	PC Engine	ZX
ACE	4/5					
Commodore User	86%	72%				
Computer + Video Games		84%		79%	85%	
Raze					89%	
Sinclair User	8/10					
Your Sinclair	94%					80%
Zero	5/5	81%	79%			
Zzap!64	Positive	91%		93%		
Awards
Publication	Award					
Crash	Coin-op of the month					

In Japan, Game Machine listed Special Criminal Investigation as the second most successful upright arcade unit of November 1989. It went on to become Japan's third highest-grossing dedicated arcade game of 1990, below Super Monaco GP and Winning Run Suzuka GP. The arcade game was also a major hit in Europe, particularly in the United Kingdom, where Taito shipped 1,500 units by January 1990.
