= Crazy Castle =

Video game series

- North American NES cover for the first game
- Genre: Platform
- Developers: Kemco; Tantalus Interactive (Woody Woodpecker in Crazy Castle 5)
- Publishers: Kemco; Activision (The Real Ghostbusters); Nintendo (Crazy Castle 3 non-Japan release and Crazy Castle and Crazy Castle 2 Players Choice U.S. release)
- Platforms: Famicom Disk System, NES, Game Boy, Game Boy Color, Game Boy Advance

Crazy Castle is a platform video game series created by Kemco and released on the Famicom Disk System, Nintendo Entertainment System, Game Boy, Game Boy Color, and Game Boy Advance. It stars different popular cartoon characters, most notably the Warner Bros. cartoon character Bugs Bunny, the Walt Disney cartoon character Mickey Mouse and the Universal cartoon character Woody Woodpecker.

== History ==
Kemco started the franchise after they licensed the rights to produce a Famicom Disk System game based on the film Who Framed Roger Rabbit. When Kemco was planning to release it outside Japan, there was already an NES game based on the same film developed by Rare and published by LJN. Licensing issues occurring in Western markets, as Capcom owned rights to release Disney-based video games outside Japan at the time, had also been cited as a factor. In order to release the game outside Japan, Kemco bought the rights to Warner Bros.' Looney Tunes franchise to produce Looney Tunes-based video games.

When the promotion of the film Who Framed Roger Rabbit in Japan ended, Kemco lost the rights to produce video games based on the film there, but gained the rights to produce Disney-based ones, due to the Who Framed Roger Rabbit film being produced by Touchstone Pictures, a studio owned by The Walt Disney Company. Kemco later produced their Mickey Mouse versions in the Crazy Castle series and released most of these versions exclusively in Japan, while continuing their Looney Tunes versions outside Japan; however, some were based on other licenses such as ITE's Hugo media franchise, Jim Davis's Garfield comic strip and The Real Ghostbusters animated television series.

Prior to the release of Bugs Bunny: Crazy Castle 3 worldwide, Kemco released the compilation Bugs Bunny Collection exclusively in Japan, which was a re-release of Mickey Mouse I and II, but with the Bugs Bunny sprite set and other minor updates (such as the Super Game Boy support). The rest of the games in the Crazy Castle series were released as original titles throughout all territories from this point forward.

The fifth entry of the Crazy Castle series starred Walter Lantz's Woody Woodpecker in the role, rather than Bugs Bunny, due to Kemco losing their license to release Warner Bros. properties, while switching to the exclusive rights for releasing Universal Studios properties, because of their release of the Nintendo GameCube title, Universal Studios Theme Parks Adventure, in which Woody was also one of the main characters.

== Gameplay ==
While presented in a side-scrolling platform game format, most of the Crazy Castle games do not have a jump function. By taking different planned routes (for example by stairs, ladders and teleporters) the character can avoid enemies and collect certain items. Some of the levels have weapons or invincibility items that can be used against the enemies in the game. There are also objects that the player must collect in order to complete a level, like keys. Passwords can be used to start at a certain level.

== Games in the series ==
Japanese title		North American title	PAL region title		System	Year
ロジャーラビット; Roger Rabbit		The Bugs Bunny Crazy Castle			FDS/NES	1989
ミッキーマウス; Mickey Mouse	バックス・バニーコレクション Bugs Bunny Collection	The Bugs Bunny Crazy Castle			Game Boy	1989 & 1990
ミッキーマウスII; Mickey Mouse II	バックス・バニーコレクション Bugs Bunny Collection	The Bugs Bunny Crazy Castle 2	Mickey Mouse	Hugo	Game Boy	1991–1996
ミッキーマウスIII 夢ふうせん; Mickey Mouse III: Yume Fūsen (lit. "Mickey Mouse III: Balloon Dreams")		Kid Klown in Night Mayor World			NES	1992 & 1993
ミッキーマウスIV 魔法のラビリンス; Mickey Mouse IV: Mahō no Labyrinth (lit. "Mickey Mouse IV: The Magical Labyrinth")		The Real Ghostbusters	Garfield Labyrinth		Game Boy	1993
ミッキーマウスV 魔法のステッキ; Mickey Mouse V: Mahō no Stick (lit. "Mickey Mouse V: The Magical Stick")		Mickey Mouse: Magic Wands!	Mickey Mouse V: Zauberstäbe!		Game Boy	1993 & 1998
それゆけ！！ キッド Go! Go! Kid! Soreyuke!! Kid: Go! Go! Kid (lit. "Let's Go!! Kid: Go! Go! Kid")	バックス・バニー クレイジーキャッスル3; Bugs Bunny: Crazy Castle 3	Bugs Bunny: Crazy Castle 3			Game Boy/Game Boy Color	1997 & 1999
バックス・バニー クレイジーキャッスル4; Bugs Bunny in Crazy Castle 4		Bugs Bunny in Crazy Castle 4			Game Boy Color	2000
ウッディー・ウッドペッカー クレイジーキャッスル5; Woody Woodpecker: Crazy Castle 5		Woody Woodpecker in Crazy Castle 5			Game Boy Advance	2002 & 2003

== Reception ==
GamePro gave Bugs Bunny Crazy Castle 2 a fairly positive review, opining that "with smooth animation, good fun, and lively action, Bugs Bunny on the Game Boy is actually better than the NES version."
