= Brat (video game) =

1991 video game

- Developer(s): Foursfield
- Publisher(s): Image Works
- Platform(s): Amiga, Atari ST
- Release: 1991
- Genre(s): Puzzle
- Mode(s): Single-player

Brat is an action puzzle video game developed by Foursfield and published by Image Works for the Amiga and Atari ST in 1991.

== Gameplay ==
Brat is an isometric action puzzle in which the player guides Nathan, the brat of the title, through a series of twelve levels. The isometric landscape scrolls up-screen, imposing a time limit on each level. Whilst Nathan automatically walks forwards at the same rate, if he is diverted he will begin to lag behind. If the screen catches up with him, the player loses one of three lives and must restart the level. Nathan is not controlled directly: the player must place icons onto the level to guide his movement. There are a variety of items that can be collected by Nathan, then later placed by the player to bypass certain obstacles: deadly spring toys can be suppressed with a lead weight, and building blocks can bridge gaps, for example.

== Reception ==
Reception

Review scores
Publication	Score
Amiga Format	87%
Zero	90%
CU Amiga	73%
The One	93%
ACE	850
Amiga Power	65%

Brat was met with moderate critical success, drawing comparison with Lemmings. Reviewers praised the game's intuitive interface, challenging but achievable puzzles, clear graphical style, and original, addictive gameplay. However, the game was criticised for its unforgiving nature when the player makes slight errors, as was some excessive disk access. CU Amiga found the gameplay to be "tedious and long-winded", the level restarts too frustrating, and the puzzle elements compared unfavourably with Lemmings. Amiga Power criticized the design of the titular character, describing him as nauseating and irritating.
