= The Bugs Bunny Crazy Castle 2 =

1991 video game

- Cover art
- Developer: Kemco
- Publishers: JP/EU: Kemco; NA: Seika; NA: Nintendo (Player's Choice); EU: Laguna Video Games (Hugo)
- Series: Crazy Castle
- Platform: Game Boy
- Release: JP: April 26, 1991 (Mickey Mouse II); NA: September 1991; EU: 1992 (Mickey Mouse); NA: 1996 (Players Choice); EU: 1996 (Hugo); JP: December 19, 1997 (Bugs Bunny Collection)
- Genre: Action
- Mode: Single-player

The Bugs Bunny Crazy Castle 2 is a platform video game developed and published by Kemco for the Game Boy in 1991. It is the sequel to the 1989 Nintendo Entertainment System and Game Boy game The Bugs Bunny Crazy Castle.

This game was originally a Mickey Mouse game; it was released in Japan as Mickey Mouse II (Note: Japanese: ミッキーマウスII, Hepburn: Mikkī Mausu Tsu) and in Europe as simply Mickey Mouse. A second reskin, themed around the Hugo franchise and simply titled Hugo, was released in Europe in 1996. This game's Bugs Bunny version was released in Japan in 1997 through Bugs Bunny Collection (Note: Japanese: バックス・バニーコレクション, Hepburn: Bakkusu Banī Korekushon), a Game Boy compilation containing this game and its predecessor.

It was followed by a sequel, Bugs Bunny: Crazy Castle 3, in 1999.

== Gameplay and plot ==
Bugs Bunny must save his girlfriend Honey Bunny from Witch Hazel's enemy-filled castle. There are 28 levels with keys to collect. In each level is a locked door leading to the next level; to open it, the player must collect eight keys placed throughout the level. Various Looney Tunes characters are encountered, including Yosemite Sam, Daffy Duck, Wile E. Coyote, Little Ghost, Moth and the Flame, Sylvester, Foghorn Leghorn, Tasmanian Devil, Beaky Buzzard, Marc Antony, Merlin the Magic Mouse, and Tweety.

In Hugo, Hugo the troll's wife Hugolina gets kidnapped by the Horned King, ruler of the castle Arbarus, after agreeing to his invitation. Hugo goes to the castle to defeat the Horned King and rescue Hugolina.

== Reception ==
Reception

Review scores
Publication	Score
ACE	2/5
Video Games (DE)	69%

GamePro writer 'Riff Raff' gave Bugs Bunny Crazy Castle 2 a fairly positive review, opining that "with smooth animation, good fun, and lively action, Bugs Bunny on the Game Boy is actually better than the NES version." In August 1998, the Hugo version received a "Platinum" sales award from the Verband der Unterhaltungssoftware Deutschland (VUD), indicating sales of at least 200,000 units across Germany, Austria and Switzerland.
