= Bugs Bunny in Crazy Castle 4 =

2000 video game

- Developer: Kemco
- Publisher: Kemco
- Series: Crazy Castle
- Platform: Game Boy Color
- Release: JP: April 21, 2000; EU: July 3, 2000; NA: July 2000
- Genre: Platform
- Mode: Single-player

Bugs Bunny in Crazy Castle 4 (バックス・バニー クレイジーキャッスル4) is a platform game developed and published by Kemco as part of the Crazy Castle series. This is the first game in the series to feature the Bugs Bunny character in all of its versions, and the last one to be published under that license.

== Plot ==
While cleaning out his rabbit hole, Bugs Bunny finds a map leading to a location marked "C Castle", although he does not know what the C stands for, as the letters after the initial "C" have worn away. He immediately assumes the C stands for "Carrot" and eagerly embarks on a journey to discover the castle in the center of the Taz Island, unaware that the C actually stands for "Crazy".

== Gameplay ==
As in Bugs Bunny: Crazy Castle 3, the game is divided into a number of level series, this time a total of over 100 levels across 13 areas. Bugs first navigates various outer environments of the Taz Island: a forest, caves, a hollow tree, mountains, a stream, and a tropical area. He then explores the rooms of the castle: the grounds, the courtyard, the ice room, the machine room, towers, and halls, before confronting the Tasmanian Devil, the game's final boss and apparently the castle's ruler, in the throne room. Some areas feature gimmicks like mushrooms Bugs can bounce off of in the forest and teleporters in the machine room. To advance through each level, he must collect eight keys while avoiding or fighting back against a large cast of Looney Tunes characters. Besides Taz, these include Beaky Buzzard, Count Bloodcount, Daffy Duck, Elmer Fudd, Elvis the gorilla, Foghorn Leghorn, Fox Pop, Gossamer, Little Ghost, Marc Antony, O'Pat the leprechaun, Pepe Le Pew, Wile E. Coyote, Witch Hazel, and Yosemite Sam. Helpful items, including weapons to eliminate enemies, can be stored in the inventory. Some enemies wander back and forth in the same area, with Elmer and Sam able to shoot projectiles, while others freely roam around the levels. Taz himself can not only roam around the map but also spit multiple projectiles and quickly catch up to Bugs when he is far away by spinning through the air in a vortex. A password system is used to load saved games. Upon completing the final level, Bugs rescues Lola Bunny.

== Reception ==
Reception

Review scores
Publication	Score
GameSpot	5/5
IGN	6/10
Honest Gamers	1.5/5

Reception of the game has been generally mixed.
