= Bodyworks Voyager: Missions in Anatomy =

1994 video game

- Developer: Mythos Software
- Publisher: Software Marketing Corporation
- Platform: MS-DOS
- Release: NA: 1994
- Genres: Educational, first-person shooter
- Mode: Single-player

Bodyworks Voyager is an educational first-person shooter for MS-DOS released in 1994. It was developed by Mythos Software and published by Software Marketing Corporation. The game teaches human anatomy, mixing shooter gameplay with quizzes on the human body.

== Gameplay ==
Besides exploring the multiple layers and parts of the human body within the Medical Database, the prime objective of the game is to destroy all infecting microbes in a hospital patient by use of a fighter ship reduced by shrink ray and inserted into the body. All microbes must be destroyed to accomplish a mission and save the patient. There two kinds of microbes, one that attacks the patient more often and the latter that attacks the ship more often.

In the ship's control system there are four utilities. The target indicator determines where shots are fired. The patient screen indicates the patient's vitality and the microbe threat level presence. The radar show's the ship's and microbes' positions. The ship screen indicates the ship's vitality and firepower rate.

Reception

Review scores
Publication	Score
AllGame	3/5
PC Review	5/10

Bodyworks Voyager received mixed reviews upon release. Steve Greenlee of Computer Game Review described the game as being an "entertaining and educational" title with "decent graphics and an average interface". Nick Smith of Allgame described Bodyworks Voyager as "easy to pick up, fun and educational", although becoming "somewhat repetitive after a few hours". Comparing the game to Microcosm Martin Klimes of PC Review found Bodyworks Voyager to lack the graphics and quality of a commercial standalone game.
