= Mickey's Dangerous Chase =

1991 video game

- European cover art
- Developer: Now Production
- Publishers: NA/EU: Capcom; JP: Kemco; NA: Nintendo (Player's Choice)
- Producer: Darlene Waddington
- Composer: Keiji Sakata
- Platform: Game Boy
- Release: NA: May 1991; EU: 1992; JP: December 18, 1992; NA: 1997 (re-release)
- Genre: Platform
- Mode: Single-player

Mickey's Dangerous Chase, known in Japan as Mickey's Chase (Japanese: ミッキーズ・チェイス), is a platform video game developed by Now Production for the Game Boy. It was released in North America in 1991 and Europe in 1992 by Capcom and Japan in December 1992 by Kemco; it was later re-released by Nintendo under the Player's Choice brand, making it one of the first games to be sold under the brand.

== Gameplay ==
Mickey facing Big Bad Pete

The player takes the role of either Mickey Mouse or his girlfriend Minnie. On the way to deliver a present, Pete came along and stole it. Gameplay wise, it is similar to Capcom's previous Disney game, Chip 'n Dale Rescue Rangers, and similar to the said game, the player can destroy enemies with throwing them boxes or blocks.

There are items that grant temporary invincibility along with a 1-up and boosts to the player's health. Players have to navigate a lake, the summit of a mountain, through a vast forest, and even stroll through the shopping center while avoiding insects, small mammals, and snowballs. All of these enemies appear in their appropriate levels (i.e., no ghosts in the town level, no flying squirrels in the haunted house level.

== Reception ==
Reception

Review score
Publication	Score
Nintendo Power	3.4/5 stars

Nintendo Power magazine gave the game a 68% in their March 1991 issue.

== See also ==
- List of Disney video games
