= B-1 Nuclear Bomber =

1980 video game

- Developer: Microcomputer Games
- Publisher: Avalon Hill
- Platforms: Apple II, Atari 8-bit, PET, VIC-20, Commodore 64, CP/M, MS-DOS, TRS-80, TI-99/4A
- Release: NA: 1980; 1981: Atari
- Genre: Flight simulator
- Mode: Single-player

B-1 Nuclear Bomber is a flight simulator developed by Avalon Hill and Microcomputer Games and released in 1980 for the Apple II and other computers. The game is based on piloting a B-1 Lancer to its target and dropping a nuclear bomb. The USSR is one of the target countries.

== Gameplay ==
The game box details a sample scenario set in the then-future of a bombing run over Moscow on July 1, 1991, which turned out to be just months before the official dissolution of the Soviet Union on December 26 of that year.

== Reception ==
Larry Kerns reviewed B-1 Nuclear Bomber in The Space Gamer No. 33 and commented that:

Overall, I feel that the [...] price tag is too high and the game is quickly boring. The big fancy box is a waste and although putting all three languages on one tape is an innovative idea, two-thirds of what you bought is wasted. I expected more from Avalon Hill's baby but was disappointed. I hope their other new games are better.

Chris Cummings reviewed the game for Computer Gaming World, and stated that:

B-1 Nuclear Bomber [...] will bring hours of fun, especially to the war monger who has always wondered what it would be like to sit in the cockpit of a sophisticated flying machine and drop a nuclear load on the 'enemy'.

In March 1983 B-1 Nuclear Bomber tied for eighth place in the Dog of the Year awards from Softline "for badness in computer games", Atari 8-bit computers division, based on reader submissions. A 1992 Computer Gaming World survey of wargames with modern settings gave the game zero stars out of five, stating that "its play mechanics were embarrassing when it was initially released". The magazine in 1994 said that AH's games such as B-1 "were dated even when they were released back on the old 8-bit machines".
