= BushBuck Charms, Viking Ships & Dodo Eggs =

1991 video game

Bushbuck Charms, Viking Ships & Dodo Eggs
- Developer: Reckon
- Publisher: PC Globe
- Platforms: Amiga, MS-DOS
- Release: 1991
- Genre: Educational

Bushbuck Charms, Viking Ships & Dodo Eggs, also known as Bush Buck: Global Treasure Hunter, is an educational video game released in 1991 for Amiga and MS-DOS. Developed by the Australian company Reckon, the game was published by PC Globe, a small US-based company that specialized in edutainment software in the late 1980s and early 90s. Bushbuck Charms, Viking Ships and Dodo Eggs teaches geography through a storyline involving a global scavenger hunt for unusual items. The player has to find fifteen items which the game chose from a selection of hundreds of possible items. A few of the possible items are a hemlock leaf, a lava-lava, and an alpaca poncho.

== Gameplay ==

The game is played by flying from city to city seeking treasures as laid out at the beginning of the round. The game has three possible modes, one player with no computer player (not available in advanced skill), one player with computer player, and two player.

The game starts in a randomly selected city which becomes the home base for that round's competition, to which the player must return to redeem treasures for points and additional tickets. If the player collects all available items, a one way flight back to the home base city is rewarded. Five items are made available at any one time with a total of fifteen items available for the entire round.

=== Weather ===
Different weather-related obstacles are presented while heading from city to city. At times the player may have to choose to either fly through a blizzard, typhoon, hailstorm, rain storm, hurricane, or pick another city than the one intended. If the player chooses to go through the storm, they may make it, or they may be redirected back to the original city. If there are any items on board when flying through inclement weather, they will be roughed up, and be worth less points when turned in.

=== Tickets ===
The player starts with a set number of tickets at the beginning of the round (60 in beginner, 50 in intermediate, 40 in advanced). One ticket is used per flight, and if a player chooses to fly through a storm and does not make it to the desired destination, between one and three tickets need to be cashed in to pay for damages to the plane. When the player returns items to the home base, 10 additional tickets are given per item returned.

=== Infoboxes ===
Each city has an "infobox" which pops up either when the player flies into the city, or when the player clicks on the city in the pointer mode. The infoboxes contain varied interesting information about the city, from famous people from there to who founded it, and have an underlined feature such as a monument or attraction present in that city.

=== Clues ===
Clues are available at certain cities as indicated by a little black box on the map. Five clues are available for each item, and the clues get progressively more helpful as the player finds them. City features, historical facts, and pop culture references, as well as infobox information is used.

=== Skill Levels ===
The game has three levels of skill: Beginner, Intermediate and Advanced.

As a "Beginner" the player faces a stereotyped French person called Pierre. On Beginner, there is a gauge on the left on the screen that shows how close the player is to an item. So in theory, the player could follow the gauge until, by a process of elimination, the item is found. The European version of the game features instead a typical Texan person that goes by the name of John.

On the "Intermediate" level the player faces a stereotyped Russian person called Natasha. On Intermediate, the gauge is removed and is replaced by a button with an eye on it. When the player is in the right city, the eye lights up, which when pressed gives the item over to the player.

When playing on "Advanced" the player faces a German aristocrat called Otto. On Advanced, the eye remains, but the lighting up feature is removed so the city which the item is in must be pinpointed exactly to reveal the item in question. Otto occasionally flies long distance flights that the player cannot. He sends the player to the wrong country, not the city the player clicked. If the player happens to be in the same city as Otto when an item is found, Otto will take it. Also, if the player flies to a country Otto has visited, a picture of Otto appears above the infobox with a speech bubble saying "Otto vaz ere!"

== Reception ==
Computer Gaming World called the graphics and audio mediocre, but recommended the game to children and adults interested in geography and maps.
