= Bombuzal =

1988 video game

- Commodore 64 cover art
- Developers: Image Works; Kemco
- Publishers: Image Works; Kemco
- Designers: Antony Crowther; David Bishop
- Platforms: Amiga, Atari ST, Commodore 64, MS-DOS, Super Nintendo Entertainment System
- Release: 1988 (Amiga, Atari ST and Commodore 64; 1989 (MS-DOS); SNES: JP: December 1, 1990; NA: August 1992
- Genre: Puzzle
- Mode: Single-player

Bombuzal, known in America as Ka-Blooey, is a 1988 puzzle video game designed by Antony Crowther (credited as "Ratt" in the game) and David Bishop for Image Works. The game was initially released in 1988 for the Amiga, Atari ST and Commodore 64. It was later released in 1989 for MS-DOS. It was released for Nintendo Entertainment System consoles not long after — in December 1990 in Japan for the Super Famicom, and in August 1992 in North America (where it was named as Ka-Blooey).

The game has a sequel/remake available for the Nintendo 64 called Charlie Blast's Territory. Among its notable features is the ability to play using either an overhead or isometric view.

The Super NES version of the game was later released on the Nintendo Classics service for the Nintendo Switch console in July 2021. Similarly, the DOS version of the game was later released on Steam on August 2019.

== Gameplay ==
Teleporter as rescue

To complete each of its 130 levels, the avatar has to destroy all bombs on the level. It must stand on top of the bomb to light it, then is only able to take one step away before the bomb explodes; it can also pick up and move bombs, but only the ones that are on Rail tiles. Bombs come in different sizes and it is only possible to ignite the smallest kind without dying. In most cases, the bombs must be set off using a chain reaction to prevent the avatar from being killed in the explosion. On other occasions, separated small bombs can be destroyed one at a time. Each bomb/mine has a reaction zone. For example, a small bomb will only destroy the tile it is on, but will affect any other bombs/mines one tile away in the four main directions. A large bomb will destroy 13 tiles, and its reaction zone will be one tile further away than the tiles destroyed in each of the four directions, and diagonally between these four points. The game features level designs by several gaming celebrities, including Jon Ritman, Andrew Braybrook, Geoff Crammond and Jeff Minter.

There are also two enemies, Sinister and Dexter, appearing on some levels. These continuously travel along with the level. Sinister always turns to the left and Dexter always turns to the right. Neither Sinister nor Dexter actively pursues the avatar, but contact with either is fatal.

== Reception ==
Reception

Review scores
Publication	Score
Famitsu	6/10, 7/10, 7/10, 5/10 (SNES)
Zzap!64	97%

Award
Publication	Award
Zzap!64	Gold Medal

The game received mixed reviews. It received 97% and 92% ratings from Zzap!64 magazine for the C64 and Amiga versions respectively, compared to a review in Commodore User magazine awarding a mere 49%. The former reviews hailed it as an addictive puzzle game with "cute" graphics, while the latter criticized gameplay, graphics, and controls.

It was released in Japan for the Super Famicom on December 1, 1990.

The game was released by Spotlight Software and distributed by Cinemaware in the compilation BrainBlaster with Xenon 2 for the Amiga. This compilation was reviewed in 1991 in Dragon #165 by Hartley, Patricia, and Kirk Lesser in "The Role of Computers" column. The reviewers gave BrainBlaster 5 out of 5 stars.

The Amiga version of Bombuzal was included as a fully working game on the cover disk of the first issue of Amiga Power.
