= Beyond the Tesseract =

1983 video game

- Designer(s): David Lo
- Platform(s): TRS-80, MS-DOS, Atari ST, Unix
- Release: 1983
- Genre(s): Text adventure
- Mode(s): Single-player

Beyond the Tesseract is a text-based adventure game developed in 1983 by Canadian author David Lo for the TRS-80. The game was notable for its unique take on the genre and approach to mathematical entities and abstract concepts. In one section the player must navigate a text adventure game, inside the text adventure game. In another the player, while asleep, derives a proof using physical representations of various symbolic logic components.

The game is intentionally vague using a VERB NOUN gameplay mechanic with a vocabulary of just 200.

In 1988 the game was rewritted from BASIC to C as V2.0, for MS-DOS and Atari ST; included was a patch file for V2.0p making it portable to Unix environments. It was published on Usenet that year, where it received a small patch submitted to fix issues in the Unix port, which became version V2.1p. In 2003, it was ported with minor modifications to the Z-machine interactive fiction standard virtual machine by Andrew Plotkin.

== Original release notes ==
Scenario: "You have reached the final part of your mission. You have gained access to the complex, and all but the last procedure has been performed. Now comes a time of waiting, in which you must search for the hidden 12-word message that will aid you at the final step. But what choice will you make when that time comes?"

The scenario for the adventure is meant to be vague. Once the adventure has been completed, the scenario will hopefully become clear.

Instructions: This adventure recognizes the standard commands for moving (N, E, S, W), taking inventory (I), manipulating objects (GET, DROP, LOOK), and saving games (SAVE, LOAD), as well as many others. Use 2-word 'verb noun' commands, such as 'use stack' or 'get all'. Only the first four letters of each word are significant. The adventure recognizes about 200 words, so if one word does not work, try another.

Notes: "The "stack" is an acronym for Space Time Activated Continuum Key. You will find this object very useful. Try the command "use stack"."

This adventure is abstract and a bit on the technical side. Basic knowledge of the names of interesting mathematical objects would be a definite asset in solving the puzzles. However, detailed knowledge of the technical background is not necessary, although it will make the adventure more enjoyable and reduce the amount of comments of the form "Was that supposed to be funny or what? I don't get it."

There is no carry limit, no death traps, and over 200 words in the program's vocabulary, so the player can hopefully concentrate on solving the adventure instead of solving the program. The map of the adventure can be draw on a grid. All it takes is a little experimenting to put all the subsets of locations together "logically".

History: The idea of a mathematically abstract adventure came about during the summer of 1983, when I was reading the book Godel, Escher, Bach: An Eternal Golden Braid. I had just read an article on writing adventures, and I thought about doing my own article on adventure writing. I did start on the article, and one of the examples of how varied puzzles can be is a mathematical adventure where the player has to "use a probability function to cross a field of improbability to get to a vortex." Sadly the article was never finished, although remnants of it can be found in the ADV.DOC file. I started thinking more and more about a mathematically abstract adventure, and Tesseract was born!

The very first adventure that I wrote was in 1982, titled "Hall of the Mountain King" (find the Crystal of Light). Tesseract Version 1.0 was the second of the three TRS-80 BASIC adventures that I wrote in a two-month adventure-frenzy during the summer of 1983. The first was "Project Triad" (defuse the bomb on the space station), and the third was "Codename Intrepid" (deliver a package to another agent).
