= Battle for Normandy (video game) =

1982 video game

- Publisher: Strategic Simulations
- Platforms: Apple II, Atari 8-bit, Commodore 64, MS-DOS, TRS-80
- Release: 1982
- Genre: Wargame

Battle for Normandy is a computer wargame published in 1982 by Strategic Simulations.

== Gameplay ==
Battle for Normandy is a game in which the operations from the landing at Normandy up through the build-up that led to Operation Cobra is simulated.

== Reception ==
Computer Gaming World reviewed the game and stated that "Overall, Battle for Normandy is an enjoyable game that will allow multiple playings and repeated playings with equal satisfaction."

Robert S. Cauthorn for the Arizona Daily Star said that "The game is difficult to learn at the beginning, but once rolling, it is thrilling - and teaches players a good deal about the invasion itself."
