= Battle of Antietam (video game) =

1985 video game

- Publisher: Strategic Simulations
- Designers: Chuck Kroegel; David Landrey
- Platforms: Apple II, Atari 8-bit, Commodore 64, MS-DOS
- Release: 1985
- Genre: Wargame

Battle of Antietam is a computer wargame written for the Apple II by Chuck Kroegel and David Landrey and published by Strategic Simulations in 1985.

== Gameplay ==
Battle of Antietam is a game in which the Battle of Antietam is simulated.

== Reception ==
William H. Harrington reviewed the game for Computer Gaming World, and stated that "SSI and the authors have created more than a first rate grand tactical simulation of one of the most critical battles of the Civil War with BOA. They have captured some of the look and 'feel' of Civil War combat, and it shows."

== See also ==
- Sid Meier's Antietam!
