= Back to Baghdad =

1995 video game

- Developer: Military Simulations
- Publisher: Military Simulations
- Platform: MS-DOS
- Release: November 1, 1995
- Genre: Combat flight simulator
- Mode: Single-player

Back to Baghdad is a 1995 combat flight simulator video game developed and published by Military Simulations.

== Gameplay ==
Back to Baghdad is a combat flight simulator: its gameplay involves piloting a realistic reproduction of the F-16 fighter jet.

== Reception ==
Reception

Review scores
Publication	Score
Computer Games Strategy Plus	4/5
PC Gamer (US)	78%
PC Games	C−
Computer Game Review	78/100

Writing for PC Games, Peter Olafson gave Back to Baghdad a largely negative review. He concluded, "I do like a good flight sim, but here, again and again, I felt lost in a world that offered small rewards for hard work." Mike Stassus of Computer Game Review was more positive: he called the game "a pretty good entry for serious flight sim fans" despite its flaws. Computer Games Strategy Plus offered yet a better review, with Steve Wartofsky dubbing Back to Baghdad "the first real contender for the serious simulation crown we've seen since SSI's release of Su-27".
