= Blade Warrior =

1991 video game

- Publisher: Image Works
- Platforms: Amiga, MS-DOS, Atari ST
- Release: 1991
- Genre: Beat 'em up
- Mode: Single-player

Blade Warrior is a beat 'em up video game, released in 1991 by Image Works for Amiga, Atari ST, and MS-DOS. The game was created by Jason Kingsley.

== Gameplay ==
Blade Warrior is a side-scrolling brawler. The game is a mix of adventuring and battling, in which players are tasked with collecting magical items, exploring landscapes (via the in-game map), and fighting off enemies. Various facilities in the game are accessible only when a certain number of artifacts have been collected.

Different monsters in the game require different attacking moves to be destroyed. The game's central villain, Murk, can be encountered several times throughout the game. Each time he's defeated, he will return stronger the next time. Murk's location can be found on the game map which can help players avoid him. Players are further warned by environmental changes: the weather worsens and the sky turns red.

Spell ingredients that players collect can be crafted into spells. The player can hold up to 16 spells in each off their 12 spell slots (which map to function key on the keyboard).

After visiting one of the seven wizards, players can ride a dragon to return to their home tower, at which point the game temporarily becomes a shoot 'em up, where the player must kill harpies until the journey is completed.

A notable feature of Blade Warrior is the graphical interface: all objects in the game are seen in silhouette, except for obtainable items and the effects of magic spells. The background is made up of a night sky with clouds, hills, and such.

== Plot ==
The world has been enslaved by Murk. In order to defeat him, the player's character needs a legendary sword guarded by a wizard. To enchant the sword, the wizard requires a stone tablet, fragments of which are held by seven other wizards, who each inhabits a tower and requires a spell ingredient in exchange for their fragment.

== Development ==
Blade Warrior was developed by Jason Kingsley before he co-founded Rebellion with his brother Chris. The game was originally titled Paladin – Lord of the Dancing Blades before being renamed. The Amiga version was later re-released on budget labels by GBH in 1992 and by Zeppelin Platinum in 1993.

== Reception ==
The One Amiga rated Blade Warrior 82/100, highlighting the originality of the game's art and the quality of its sound effects. They critique the premise, calling it derivative, and the combat for having too few move options, but argue the game is still worth it due to its price. CU Amiga felt similarly positive about Blade Warrior, praising its graphics, sound, gameplay, and the interactions (conversing and trading) with the seven wizards. They gave the game an 84/100.

Zero rated Blade Warrior 72/100, praising the game's graphics but critiquing the way environmental elements (ex. trees) can block the player's view of their character. They further criticized how the environments are too similar and that the game lacked depth. Mark Ramshaw at Amiga Power had similar opinions on the game, giving it a 70/100 and describing it as "all style and (thankfully) just enough substance." Although describing the game as ultimately slightly unsatisfying, they called it "the Ridley Scott of computer games" and highlighted how atmospheric it is.

Jonathan Nash, also writing for Amiga Power, had a very different view of the game, rating it an 8/100. He described the game as gimmicky and dull.

Other reviews of the original 1991 Amiga release included a 77% from Jonathan Davies in Amiga Power, 74% from Amiga Format, 74% from Amiga Action, 66% from Amiga User International, and 50% from the German magazine Amiga Joker.
