= Image Works =

UK business

- Industry: Video game publisher
- Founded: 1988; 38 years ago
- Defunct: 1992
- Headquarters: United Kingdom
- Products: Cadaver; Speedball; Bombuzal; Xenon 2: Megablast

Image Works was a British video game publisher that served as a publishing label for Mirrorsoft between 1988 and 1992, when the parent company went bankrupt and was sold to Acclaim Entertainment.

== History ==
The first two games published under the Image Works label were Fernandez Must Die and Foxx Fights Back. Image Works notably became the European publisher for all the titles developed by The Bitmap Brothers, starting with their second game Speedball, until The Bitmap Brothers founded their own publishing brand Renegade Software.

Over the course of its existence, Image Works also acquired the publishing rights to film adaptations from the Back to the Future and Predator franchises, as well as home computer ports of arcade and console games such as Passing Shot, Cisco Heat and the first two Teenage Mutant Ninja Turtles games by Konami: these ports and adaptations were consistently released on all the Western 8-bit and 16-bit computer systems supported by the publisher.

Until the demise of Mirrorsoft in 1992, games were published on ZX Spectrum, Amstrad CPC, Commodore 64, Amiga, Atari ST, and MS-DOS as well as other platforms such as the MSX and Master System. In 1991, the company entered into a graphic adventure market with the launch of its technology, called Virtual Theater, which allowed the game world to develop independently of the central character, and the technology was created by Revolution Software.

In North America, games published under the label in Europe was published by companies Konami, who operated it alongside Mirrorsoft in a joint venture in April 1991 called Konami/Image Works, Cinemaware, who was releasing it under Spotlight Software, and Spectrum HoloByte, which at that time was owned by Mirror Group, who launched along with Mirrorsoft, a label called Arena Entertainment in 1991, both Mirrorsoft and HoloByte sold Arena to Acclaim Entertainment in 1992, which Acclaim is also buying Mirrorsoft.

== Games published ==
Year	Title	Platform(s)	
Year	Title	PC	Console
1988	Bombuzal	Amiga, Atari ST, Commodore 64, MS-DOS	–
1988	Fernandez Must Die	Amiga, Amstrad CPC, Atari ST, Commodore 64, ZX Spectrum	–
1988	Foxx Fights Back	Commodore 64, ZX Spectrum	–
1988	SkyChase	Amiga, Atari ST	–
1988	Speedball	Amiga, Atari ST, Commodore 64, MS-DOS	Master System
1989	Blasteroids	Amiga, Amstrad CPC, Atari ST, Commodore 64, MS-DOS, MSX, ZX Spectrum	–
1989	Bloodwych	Amiga, Amstrad CPC, Atari ST, Commodore 64, MS-DOS, ZX Spectrum	–
1989	Interphase	Amiga, Atari ST, MS-DOS	–
1989	Omnicron Conspiracy	Amiga, Atari ST, MS-DOS	–
1989	Passing Shot	Amiga, Amstrad CPC, Atari ST, Commodore 64, MSX, ZX Spectrum	–
1989	Phobia	Amiga, Atari ST, Commodore 64	–
1989	Xenon 2: Megablast	Amiga, Atari ST, MS-DOS	Master System
1990	Back to the Future Part II	Amiga, Amstrad CPC, Atari ST, Commodore 64, MS-DOS, ZX Spectrum	Master System
1990	Cadaver	Amiga, Atari ST, MS-DOS	–
1990	Flip-it & Magnose: Water Carriers from Mars	Amiga, Atari ST	–
1990	Gravity	Amiga, Atari ST	–
1990	Speedball 2: Brutal Deluxe	Amiga, Atari ST, Commodore 64, MS-DOS	–
1990	Teenage Mutant Hero Turtles	Amiga, Amstrad CPC, Atari ST, Commodore 64, MS-DOS, MSX, ZX Spectrum	–
1990	Theme Park Mystery	Amiga, Atari ST, MS-DOS	–
1991	Back to the Future Part III	Amiga, Amstrad CPC, Atari ST, Commodore 64, MS-DOS, ZX Spectrum	Master System, Sega Genesis
1991	Bill Elliott's NASCAR Challenge	Amiga	–
1991	Blade Warrior	Amiga, Atari ST, MS-DOS	–
1991	Brat	Amiga, Atari ST	–
1991	Cisco Heat	Amiga, Amstrad CPC, Atari ST, Commodore 64, MS-DOS, ZX Spectrum	–
1991	Devious Designs	Amiga, Atari ST	–
1991	First Samurai	Amiga, Atari ST, Commodore 64	–
1991	Killing Cloud	Amiga, Atari ST, MS-DOS	–
1991	Mega Lo Mania	Amiga, Atari ST	–
1991	Predator 2	Amiga, Amstrad CPC, Atari ST, Commodore 64, MS-DOS, ZX Spectrum	–
1991	Robozone	Amiga, Amstrad CPC, Atari ST, Commodore 64, MS-DOS, ZX Spectrum	–
1991	Teenage Mutant Hero Turtles: The Coin-Op	Amiga, Amstrad CPC, Atari ST, Commodore 64, MS-DOS, ZX Spectrum	–
