= Baron: The Real Estate Simulation =

1983 video game

- Publisher: Blue Chip Software
- Platforms: Apple II, Atari 8-bit, Commodore 64, MS-DOS, Mac
- Release: 1983
- Genre: Simulation

Baron: The Real Estate Simulation is business simulation video game published in 1983 by Blue Chip Software.

== Gameplay ==
Baron is a game in which 60 months worth of real estate speculation is played in one hour.

== Reception ==
Johnny Wilson reviewed the game for Computer Gaming World, and stated that "I question whether it is probable that the housing market would be down at the same time as interest rates are down, yet Baron afforded me that frustrating environment. I would certainly like to see some of the figures on the data collection for the correlation between interest rates and the market."
