= The Real Ghostbusters (1993 video game) =

1993 video game

- North American cover art
- Developer: Kemco
- Publishers: JP/EU: Kemco; NA: Activision
- Series: Crazy Castle; Garfield; Ghostbusters
- Platform: Game Boy
- Release: JP: April 23, 1993; EU: September 1993; NA: October 1993
- Genres: Action, platform
- Mode: Single-player

The Real Ghostbusters, known in Europe as Garfield Labyrinth and in Japan as Mickey Mouse IV: Mahō no Labyrinth (ミッキーマウスIV 魔法のラビリンス, Mikkī Mausu Fō: Mahō no Rabirinsu), is a 1993 action-puzzle video game developed by Kemco and published in Japan and Europe by Kemco and in North America by Activision.

The Japanese version is based on Mickey Mouse and is part of the Mickey Mouse side of Kemco's Crazy Castle series, while the European version is based on Jim Davis's Garfield comic strips and the animated series Garfield and Friends. The North American version is based on the animated series The Real Ghostbusters and contains ten more stages than the previous incarnations.

The game is a direct lift of P. P. Hammer and his Pneumatic Weapon, featuring simplified sprites and near-identical level designs. According to the developer of P. P. Hammer, the port is entirely unauthorized.

The Japanese version was followed by a sequel, Mickey Mouse V: The Magical Stick.

== Gameplay ==
Level 1 in the North American version.

Depending on which version is played, the player controls Mickey Mouse, Peter Venkman, or Garfield. The game emphasizes puzzle-solving in a dungeon-like atmosphere. To advance to each new stage, the player has to collect stars, which open the door to the next level. In the North American version, the player has a proton gun instead of a pneumatic hammer, but it is only effective on blocks at the character's feet, not on the ghosts, which must be destroyed with bombs. If the player character loses all his health (by touching damaging things like ghosts, flames, and reforming blocks), or the 999 second timer winds down to zero, he loses a life.

The player is rewarded with a twelve-digit password after successful completion of a level, which enables them to start at the end of that level next time they play. An inventory screen is present in the Japanese version of the game.

The storyline features the two main characters (depending on the version) trying to cross a bridge. When the main character falls down the bridge, he tries to yell at the secondary character for help. All three versions in the game have a variation on the pneumatic hammer, which enhances the puzzle-solving element of the game. Venkman, however, lacks a non-player character companion (from the other Ghostbusters) in the North American version of the game and simply mutters to himself prior to falling through the broken bridge. Venkman does not find a pneumatic hammer, instead using his proton pack.

== Reception ==
Electronic Gaming Monthly gave The Real Ghostbusters a 6 out of 10, describing it as decent but "routine". Nintendo Power praised The Real Ghostbusters for its puzzle element and password feature, but stated that some of the graphics were not very clear.

Michael Thompson, writing for Ars Technica in 2009, considered the game to be a "particularly low point" for the series of Ghostbusters games. In 2013, David Houghton of GamesRadar included the game on his list of "9 weirdest video game uses of perfectly sensible licenses". In 2016, Luke McKinney of Den of Geek ranked it among the weirdest Ghostbusters games.
