= ICE Software =

UK video game developer

ICE Software was a collective of freelance video game developers from Glasgow, Scotland. It produced many successful Amiga, Atari ST, Amstrad CPC, Commodore 64 and ZX Spectrum conversions of late 1980s and early 1990s Arcade games.

Some major titles delivered were Turbo Outrun, Special Criminal Investigation and Hydra.

ICE Software was based in a back-office at 244 Bath Street, Glasgow G1, and founded by Ian Morrison (the teenage developer of many popular titles such as Beach-Head with Platinum Productions), David Anderson and Martin Kane. It stopped trading in the mid-1990s.
