= Bobby Fischer Teaches Chess (video game) =

1994 video game

- Developers: Bookup, Inc.
- Publisher: Mission Studios
- Platform: MS-DOS
- Release: 1994
- Genre: Computer chess
- Modes: Single-player, multiplayer

Bobby Fischer Teaches Chess is a 1994 chess video game developed by Bookup, Inc. and published by Mission Studios for MS-DOS.

== Gameplay ==
The game's 300 tutorials are based on the chess book Bobby Fischer Teaches Chess (1966), co-authored by grandmaster Bobby Fischer. Although the tutorials are displayed from a pseudo-3D board view, the game can only be played from a 2D view. The tutorials feature a menu that allows to rewind, pause, and forward the lesson. Included with the game is a multimedia version of Fred Wilson's book A Picture History of Chess (1981). The game features 500 of Fischer's matches, a lesson maker tool (intended for teachers and coaches), and SVGA graphics. The color of the chessboard can be changed but not the appearance of the chess pieces.

== Reception ==
Reception

Review scores
Publication	Score
Computer Gaming World	B+
Joystick	75%
PC Gamer (US)	67%
Entertainment Weekly	F
Génération 4	74%
Power Play	69%

Bobby Fischer Teaches Chess received generally average reviews. Computer Gaming World said that from the available chess programs Bobby Fischer Teaches Chess has the best tutorials but it lacks the production values of the other programs. They recommended the game to novices. Joystick called the game an excellent and interesting product but criticized the inability to play in 3D mode and the lack of French language support. PC Gamer concluded: "It's a matter of content vs. aesthetics — do the excellent beginner lessons, historical reference and strong AI outweigh that ugly 2D board with sparse options?" Entertainment Weekly summarized: "Ultimately, Bobby Fischer Teaches Chess will not teach you chess as much as it will indelibly stamp your synapses with the words caveat emptor."
