= Back to the Future Part III (video game) =

1991 video game

- Spectrum/Amstrad box art
- Developer: Probe Software
- Publishers: Image Works; Arena Entertainment
- Series: Back to the Future
- Platforms: Amiga, Amstrad CPC, Atari ST, Commodore 64, MS-DOS, Genesis, Master System, ZX Spectrum
- Release: NA: 1991; EU: 1991
- Genre: Action
- Mode: Single-player

Back to the Future Part III (or Back to the Future III) is a video game based on the film of the same name. The game is different from LJN's Back to the Future Part II & III video game released for the NES. The game was released in 1991 for the Genesis, Amiga, Amstrad CPC, Atari ST, Commodore 64, MS-DOS, Master System, and the ZX Spectrum. Each version of the game is more or less identical and all are loosely based on the popular film of the same name. The game was developed by Probe Software and published by Image Works and Arena Entertainment (for Sega).

== Gameplay ==
The main game features four different levels (there are some differences between versions).

Rescue Clara
Players control Doc Brown on a horse as he races to save Clara Clayton from running off into a ravine. Players must duck and jump over obstacles while using a pistol to shoot enemies and other obstacles. In the DOS version, there are also top down segments where Doc can collect a shotgun to fire in multiple directions.
Target Shoot
Players control Marty as he shoots targets in a target range. A bonus round can be obtained by shooting multi-colored ducks.
Marty vs. Buford's Men
Players control Marty as he uses pie dishes to fight off against Buford's men, and eventually Buford himself.
The Train
Players control Marty as he makes away across the train, collecting speed logs necessary to get the train up to 88 miles per hour (142 km/h) while fending off enemies and avoiding obstacles such as hooks or puffs of smoke.

== Reception ==
Reception

Review scores
Publication	Score
Crash	93%
Computer and Video Games	85%
Electronic Gaming Monthly	4/10, 3/10, 3/10, 3/10 (GEN)
Sinclair User	8/10
Your Sinclair	82%
MicroHobby (ES)	78%

Award
Publication	Award
Crash	Crash Smash

The game was reviewed in 1992 in Dragon #180 by Hartley, Patricia, and Kirk Lesser in "The Role of Computers" column. The reviewers gave the game 2 out of 5 stars.

The Spectrum version received a Crash Smash award, and got to number 2 in the sales charts in July 1991, behind Teenage Mutant Ninja Turtles, from the same publisher.

Two of the four reviewers in Electronic Gaming Monthly's described the release for the Sega Genesis as "no fun at all" and "a disappointment from start to finish".
