= Mickey Mouse: Magic Wands! =

1993 video game

- North American Player's Choice cover art
- Developer: Kemco
- Publishers: JP/PAL: Kemco; NA: Nintendo
- Series: Crazy Castle
- Platform: Game Boy
- Release: JP: December 22, 1993; AU: Q1 1996; NA: May 1998; EU: 1995
- Genres: Puzzle, action
- Mode: Single-player

Mickey Mouse: Magic Wands!, known in Japan as Mickey Mouse V: Mahou no Stick (ミッキーマウスV 魔法のステッキ, lit. "Mickey Mouse V: The Magical Stick") and known in Europe as Mickey Mouse V: Magic Wands!, is a puzzle/action game developed and published by Kemco in Japan on December 22, 1993. It was later released in Europe by Kemco in October 1995 and published in North America by Nintendo in May 1998 under the Player's Choice label with the western versions featuring Super Game Boy support. It is the fifth installment in the Crazy Castle series.

It was the last of Kemco's Mickey Mouse-based video games in their Crazy Castle series and the only title to be released in North America under its original title (although the Roman numeral was removed).

== Gameplay ==
To save his friends, Mickey has to collect puzzle pieces that completes images of his friends, including Minnie Mouse, Donald Duck, Goofy and even obscure characters like Grandma Duck from the comic book series. To do this, Mickey has to wave his wand over crystals which conceal pieces of the image, items, and occasional enemies. Each level has ten small stages, each with at least one image to complete. Each tenth stage has an end boss to defeat. The image to complete in the tenth stage of each level reveals the character being held captive by the end boss of that level.

== Plot ==
Mickey and his friends get lost in a forest and discover a haunted castle that belongs to the evil witch Yashja. The castle is full of tricks, traps, and magic wands to create ice and fire. Suddenly, a gaping hole opens up under Mickey's friends and they all fall in. Now Mickey has to save his friends, who are being held captive by the witch. The game ends with Mickey running to the center of a long room and calls out for Minnie, who eventually answers. They meet and embrace each other and reunite with their friends. Goofy takes a picture to celebrate their victory.

== See also ==
- List of Disney video games
