= Bugs Bunny: Crazy Castle 3 =

1997 video game

- Developer: Kemco
- Publishers: JP: Kemco; WW: Nintendo
- Series: Crazy Castle
- Platforms: Game Boy, Game Boy Color
- Release: Game Boy (Note: As Soreike!! Kid: Go! Go! Kid): JP: July 18, 1997; Game Boy Color (Note: As Bugs Bunny: Crazy Castle 3): JP: January 29, 1999; NA: January 1999; EU: 1999
- Genre: Platform
- Mode: Single-player

Bugs Bunny: Crazy Castle 3 (バックス・バニー クレイジーキャッスル3) is a platform game developed by Kemco as part of the Crazy Castle series. It was originally released in Japan as a Game Boy title in July 1997 called Soreyuke!! Kid: Go! Go! Kid (それゆけ！！ キッド Go! Go! Kid) starring the character Kid Klown. The title was later remade on the Game Boy Color to include colorized graphics and characters from the Looney Tunes series, which was released in Japan in January 1999 by Kemco, and later that year in North America and Europe by Nintendo. It replaces Honey Bunny with Lola Bunny as Bugs' love interest to be rescued. It was followed by a sequel, Bugs Bunny in Crazy Castle 4, in 2000.

== Plot ==
Bugs Bunny finds a book in an antiques shop entitled "The Treasure of the Old Castle". Bugs reads that the treasure will bring glory to its finder and is hidden somewhere in the Old Castle, but the exact location of the treasure is unknown. However, Witch Hazel has cast a spell to brainwash the other Looney Tunes into trying to stop Bugs from finding the treasure. Looney Tunes characters that appear are Daffy Duck, Tweety, Elmer Fudd, Foghorn Leghorn, Marc Antony, Pepé Le Pew, Rocky, Sylvester, Wile E. Coyote, Yosemite Sam and the final boss Taz, who guards the chest containing Lola Bunny.

== Gameplay ==
The game is divided into several areas of the Old Castle: the Garden, the Hall, the Basement, and the Treasury, in which there are 61 levels in total. The player must collect eight keys in a level to progress to the next one while outwitting enemies. Helpful items, including weapons to eliminate enemies, can be stored in the inventory. A password system is used to load saved games.

== Development ==
Crazy Castle 3 is a remake of Soreike!! Kid: Go! Go! Kid, the fourth game in the Kid Klown series developed by Kemco, which was released in Japan on the Game Boy on July 18, 1997. Like the previous two Bugs Bunny Crazy Castle games, which originally starred Roger Rabbit and Mickey Mouse, respectively, the game's graphics were modified to feature Looney Tunes characters. The Game Boy Color version starring Bugs Bunny was originally released in Japan in January 1999, with releases in North America and Europe later made available by Nintendo.

== Reception ==
Reception

Review scores
Publication	Score
AllGame	4.5/5
IGN	6/10

Peer Schneider of IGN awarded the game a 6 out of 10, declaring that aside from updated graphics it offered little innovation over the previous two Bugs Bunny Game Boy titles, calling it "simple 2D item collecting fare". Schneider elaborated while it was "easy to pick up and offers simple fun," he cautioned players not to "expect anything really new." Arron Curtiss of the Los Angeles Times called the game "A great puzzler that would work well with any hero... making Bugs the star only adds a little familiarity." The author commented that the title's increased color depth compared to previous entries in the Crazy Castle series gave it "new life", and that "Crazy Castle 3 makes good use of the palette by assigning specific characters to specific levels." Its password system was seen as counter-intuitive on a handheld, however, as "Not everyone carries a pencil and paper with them to write down alphanumeric passwords," and that an auto-save feature would have been preferable.
