= List of Amiga games (P–Z) =

This is a list of games for the Amiga computer, organised alphabetically by name. See Lists of video games for related lists.

== P ==
- Pacific Islands
- Pac-Land
- Pac-Mania
- Paladin
- Paladin 2
- Panzer Battles
- Panzer Kick Boxing
- Paperboy
- Paperboy 2
- Pandora
- Paradroid 90
- Paragliding Simulation
- Paramax
- Paranoia Complex, The
- Parasol Stars
- Paris Dakar 90
- Patrician, The
- Pawn, The
- Payback
- Pegasus
- Penguins
- Penthouse Hot Numbers
- Penthouse Hot Numbers Deluxe
- Percy E. Nash's International Soccer
- Perfect General, The
- Perihelion: The Prophecy
- Persian Gulf Inferno
- Personal Nightmare
- Peter Beardsley's International Football
- Peter Pan
- PGA European Tour
- PGA Tour Golf
- Phantasie
- Phantasie 2
- Phantasie 3
- Phantom Fighter
- Pharaoh's Curse
- Phobia
- Photopia
- Pinball Brain Damage
- Pinball Dreams
- Pinball Fantasies
- Pinball Illusions
- Pinball Magic
- Pinball Mania
- Pinball Prelude
- Pinball Wizard
- Pink Panther
- Pinkie
- Pioneer Plague
- Pipemania
- Piracy on the High Seas
- Pirates Classic
- Pit-Fighter
- Pizza Tycoon
- Plague, The
- Plan 9 from Outer Space
- Planet of Lust
- Planetfall
- Platoon
- Player Manager
- Plotting
- Plundered Hearts
- Police Quest: In Pursuit of the Death Angel
- Police Quest II: The Vengeance
- Police Quest III: The Kindred
- Pool of Radiance
- Pools of Darkness
- Pop Up
- Popeye 2
- Popeye 3: WrestleCrazy
- Populous
- Populous II: Trials of the Olympian Gods
- Portal
- Ports of Call
- Postman Pat
- Postman Pat 2
- Postman Pat 3
- P.O.W.
- Powder
- Power, The
- Power Drift
- Power Drive
- P. P. Hammer and his Pneumatic Weapon
- Power Pinball
- Power Struggle
- Powerdrome
- Powermonger
- Predator
- Predator 2
- Prehistoric Tale, A
- Prehistorik
- Premier Manager
- Premier Manager 2
- Premier Manager 3
- Premiere
- President Is Missing, The
- Prey: Alien Encounter
- Primal Rage
- Prince
- Prince of Persia
- Prison
- Pro Soccer 2190
- Pro Tennis Tour
- Pro Tennis Tour 2
- Profezia
- ProFlight
- Project Ikarus
- Project: Neptune
- Project-X
- Project X '93
- Project X SE
- Projectyle
- Prophecy, The
- Prophet, The
- Prospector
- Prospector in the Mazes of Xor
- Puffy's Saga
- Puggsy
- Purple Saturn Day
- Pursuit to Death
- Pushover
- Putty
- Putty Squad
- Puzznic

== Q ==
- Qix
- Quadralien
- Quadrel
- Quake
- Quake II
- Quantox
- Quasar
- Quattro Sports
- Quest for Glory: So You Want to Be a Hero
- Quest for Glory II: Trial by Fire
- Quest of Agravain, The
- Question of Sport, A
- Questron
- Questron 2
- Quicky
- Quik
- Quiksilver Pinball
- Qwak

== R ==
- R3
- Rackney's Island
- Raffles
- Raiden
- Railroad Tycoon
- Rainbow Islands
- Rainbow Warrior
- Rally Championships
- Rally Cross Challenge
- Rally Master
- Rampage
- Rampart
- Ramses
- Ranx
- RBI 2 Baseball
- Reach for the Skies
- Reach for the Stars
- Real Genius
- Real Ghostbusters, The
- Realm of the Trolls
- Realms
- Realms of Arkania: Blade of Destiny
- Rebelcharge at Chickamauga
- Rectangle
- Red Baron
- Red Heat
- Red Lightning
- Red Mars
- Red Storm Rising
- Red Zone
- Reederei
- Reel Fishin'
- Reflex, The
- Reflexity
- Regent
- Regnum
- Renegade
- Renegade 3
- Renegade Legion: Interceptor
- Reshoot R
- Resolution 101
- Return of Medusa
- Return to Atlantis
- Reunion
- Revelation
- Revenge of the Mutant Camels
- Rick Dangerous
- Rick Dangerous 2
- Rings of Medusa
- Rings of ZON
- Rings of Zilfin
- Rise of the Dragon
- Rise of the Robots
- Risk
- Risky Woods
- Ritter
- Road Rash
- Roadkill
- Roadwar 2000
- Roadwar Europa
- Robin Hood
- Robin Hood Legend Quest
- Robinson's Requiem
- RoboCop
- RoboCop 2
- RoboCop 3
- RoboSport
- Robot Commander
- Robots
- Rock-A-Doodle Computerized Coloring Book, The
- Rock Star Ate My Hamster
- Rock 'n' Roll
- Rocket Attack
- Rocket Ranger
- Roketz
- Rockford
- Rod Land
- Rogue
- Rogue Trooper
- Roller Coaster Rumbler
- Rollerboard
- Rolling Ronny
- Rolling Thunder
- Romance of the Three Kingdoms
- Romance of the Three Kingdoms II
- Rome: Pathway to Power
- Rorke's Drift
- Rotator
- Rotox
- Round the Bend
- R-Type
- R-Type II
- Rubicon
- Ruff 'n' Tumble
- Ruffian
- Rules of Engagement
- Rules of Engagement 2
- Running Man, The
- Run the Gauntlet
- Rüsselsheim

== S ==
- S.D.I.
- S.T.A.G.
- S.U.B.
- Sabre Team
- Saddam Hussein Game, The
- Saint Dragon
- Samurai: Way of Warrior
- Santa's Xmas Caper
- Sarakon
- SAS Combat Simulator
- Satan
- Savage
- Scapeghost
- Scary Mutant Space Aliens from Mars
- Schlachtfeld 2
- Scooby-Doo and Scrappy-Doo
- Scorched Tanks
- Scorpio
- Scorpion
- Scrabble
- Scramble Spirits
- Screaming Wings
- SDI
- Search
- Search for the Titanic
- SeaSide
- Seastalker
- Second Front: Germany Turns East
- Second Samurai
- Second World
- Secret of Monkey Island, The
- Secret of the Silver Blades
- Sensible Golf
- Sensible Soccer
- Sensible Train Spotting
- Sensible World of Soccer
- Sentinel, The
- Sergeant Seymour Robotcop
- Settlers, The
- Seven Cities of Gold, The
- The Seven Gates of Jambala
- Sex Olympics
- Sex Vixens from Space
- Sexy Droids
- Seymour Goes to Hollywood
- Seymour Take One
- Shadow Dancer
- Shadow Fighter
- Shadow of the Beast
- Shadow of the Beast II
- Shadow of the Beast III
- Shadow of the Devil
- Shadow of the Third Moon, The
- Shadow Sorcerer
- Shadow Warriors
- Shadowgate
- Shadowlands
- Shadoworlds
- Shanghai
- Shaq Fu
- Sherlock: The Riddle of the Crown Jewels
- Shinobi
- Shockwave
- Shogo: Mobile Armor Division
- Short Grey, The
- Shuffle
- Shufflepuck Café
- Shuttle
- Sideshow
- Sidewinder
- Sid Meier's Colonization
- Sid Meier's Pirates!
- Sierra Soccer
- Silent Service
- Silent Service II
- Silicon Dreams
- Silkworm
- SimCity
- SimCity 2000
- SimEarth
- SimLife
- Simon the Sorcerer
- Simon the Sorcerer II: The Lion, the Wizard and the Wardrobe
- Simpsons, The: Bart vs. the Space Mutants
- Simpsons, The: Bart vs. the World
- Simulcra
- Sinbad and the Throne of the Falcon
- Sink or Swim
- Sir Fred
- Sixth Sense Investigations
- Skate of the Art
- Skateball
- Skeleton Krew
- Skidmarks
- Skidz
- Skrull
- Skull & Crossbones
- Skweek
- Skweeks 2: Super Skweeks
- Skweeks 3: Tiny Skweeks
- Sky Cabbie
- Sky High Stuntman
- Sky Shark
- SkyChase
- Skyfox
- Skyfox II: The Cygnus Conflict
- Slabs
- Slackskin & Flint
- Slam Tilt
- Slayer
- Slaygon
- Sleeping Gods Lie
- Sleepwalker
- Sliders
- Slightly Magic
- Slu
- Sly Spy
- Solid Gold
- Smash TV
- Snow Strike
- Soccer Kid
- Soccer Pinball
- Soccer Stars '96
- Soccer Superstars
- Software Manager
- Software Tycoon
- Soldier 2000
- Soldier of Light
- Solius
- Son Shu Si
- Sonic Boom
- Sooty and Sweep
- Sophelie
- Sorcerer
- Sorcery Plus
- Soul Crystal
- Space: 1889
- Space Ace
- Space Ace 2
- Space Assault
- Space Crusade
- Space Harrier
- Space Harrier II
- Space Hulk
- Space MAX
- Space Quest: The Sarien Encounter
- Space Quest II: Vohaul's Revenge
- Space Quest III: The Pirates of Pestulon
- Space Quest IV: Roger Wilco and The Time Rippers
- Space Rogue
- Space Taxi
- Spaceball
- Spacestation
- Spaceward Ho!
- Special Forces
- Speed Racer FX
- Speedball
- Speedball 2: Brutal Deluxe
- Speedrunner
- Spellbound
- Spellbound (Psygnosis game)
- Spellbound Dizzy
- Spellbreaker
- Spellfire the Sorcerer
- Spencer
- Speris Legacy
- Spherical
- Spherical Worlds
- Spidertronic
- Spindizzy Worlds
- Spirit of Adventure
- Spirit of Excalibur
- Spitting Image
- Spoils of War, The
- Spy vs. Spy
- Spy vs. Spy 2
- Spy vs. Spy 3
- Spy Who Loved Me, The
- Squibbly Shibbly
- St. Thomas
- Stable Masters
- Star Blaze
- Starbirds
- Star Command
- Star Control
- Star Crusader
- Star Fleet I: The War Begins
- Star Flight
- Star Trek: 25th Anniversary
- Star Wars
- Star Wars: The Empire Strikes Back
- Star Wars: Return of the Jedi
- Starball
- StarBlade
- Starbreaker
- Stardust
- Starfighter
- Starfighter: D'Yammen's Reign
- Starflight
- Starflight 2
- Stargate
- Starglider
- Starglider 2
- Stargoose
- Starians
- Starlord
- Starquake
- Starray
- Starrush
- Startrash
- Stationfall
- Steel
- Steel Business
- Steel Devils
- Steel Empire
- Steigar
- Steigenberger Hotelmanager
- Stellar 7
- Stellar Crusade
- Stone Age
- Steve Davis World Snooker
- Stoppt den Calippo Fresser
- Storm Across Europe
- Storm Master
- Stormlord
- Strangers
- Stratagem
- Street Fighter
- Street Fighter II: The World Warrior
- Street Racer
- Street Rod
- Strider
- Strider 2
- Strike Force Harrier
- Striker
- Strikes & Spares 3
- Strip Poker 3
- Stryx
- Stunt Car Racer
- Stunts
- Stuntman Seymour
- Sturmtruppen: The Videogame
- Subbuteo
- Suburban Commando
- Subversion
- Subwar 2050
- Suicide Mission
- Summer Camp
- Summer Games
- Summer Games II
- Sun Crossword
- Supaplex
- Super Bluekid
- Super Cars
- Super Cars II
- Super Cauldron
- Super Foul Egg
- Super Grand Prix
- Super Grid Runner
- Super Hang-On
- Super Methane Bros.
- Super Monaco Grand Prix
- Super Off Road
- Super OsWALD
- Super Puffy
- Suspect
- Suspicious Cargo
- Super Seymour Saves the Planet
- Super Skidmarks
- Super Skidmarks 2
- Super Space Invaders
- Super Stardust
- Super Street Fighter II: The New Challengers
- Super Street Fighter II Turbo
- Superfrog
- Superman: The Man of Steel
- Superstar Ice Hockey
- Supremacy
- Surf Ninjas
- Swap
- Swibble Dibble
- Switchblade
- Switchblade 2
- SWIV
- Sword
- Sword of Aragon
- Sword of Honour
- Sword of Sodan
- Swords and Galleons
- Sword and the Rose, The
- Swords of Twilight
- Syndicate

== T ==
- T.V. Chubbies
- Taekwondo Master
- Tales from Heaven
- Tales of Gorluth
- Tangram
- Tank Attack
- Tanks Furry - 2016
- Tanx'n'Stuff
- Targhan
- Tass Times in Tonetown
- Team Suzuki
- Team Yankee
- Tearaway Thomas
- Tech
- Techno Cop
- TechnoVenture
- Teenagent
- Teenage Mutant Ninja Turtles
- Teeny Weenys
- Temple of Apshai
- Tennis Cup
- Tennis Cup 2
- Teresa
- Terminator 2 (arcade port)
- Terminator 2 (computer game)
- Terramex
- Terran Envoy
- Terrorpods
- Terry's Big Adventure
- Testament
- Test Drive
- Test Drive II
- Tetra Quest
- Tetris
- Theatre of War
- Their Finest Hour
- TFX
- Theme Park
- Theme Park Mystery
- Thexder
- Think Cross
- Think Twice
- Third Courier, The
- Thomas the Tank Engine & Friends Pinball
- Three Musketeers, The
- Three Stooges, The
- Thromulus: The Enemy within
- Thunderbirds
- Thunder Blade
- Thunder Burner
- ThunderCats
- Thunder Chopper
- Thunderhawk
- ThunderJaws
- Tie Break
- Tiger Road
- Timekeepers
- Time Machine
- Time Race
- Time Scanner
- Time Soldier
- Times Crossword
- Times of Lore
- Tin Toy Adventure
- Tintin on the Moon
- Tiny Troops
- Titan
- Titanic Blinky
- Toki
- Titus the Fox
- Tom & Jerry
- Tom and the Ghost
- Tommy Gun
- Top Banana
- Top Gear 2
- Top Wrestling
- Tornado
- Torvak the Warrior
- Total Carnage
- Total Football
- Total Recall
- Total War I & II
- Tower 57
- Tower FRA
- Tower of Babel
- Tower of Souls
- Toyota Celica GT
- Toyottes, The
- Tracker
- Train It
- Train: Escape To Normandy, The
- Trained Assassin
- Transarctica
- Transplant
- Transworld
- Transylvania
- Trapped 2
- Traps'em
- Traps'n'Treasures
- Travel Manager
- Treasure Island Dizzy
- Treasures of the Savage Frontier
- Treasure Trap
- Trex Warrior
- TrianGO
- Trinity
- Triple-X
- Tritus
- Trivial Pursuit
- Troddlers
- Trolls
- Tron
- T-Racer
- Trump Castle
- Trump Castle II
- Tubular Worlds
- Turbo Cup
- Turbo Jam
- Turbo Outrun
- Turbo Racer 3D
- Turbo Star Grand Prix
- Turbo Trax
- Turrican
- Turrican 2
- Turrican 3
- Tusker
- Twilight's Ransom
- Twilight Zone
- Twin Turbos
- Twinworld
- Two to One
- TV Sports Baseball
- TV Sports Basketball
- TV Sports Boxing
- TV Sports Football
- Typhoon
- Typhoon of Steel
- Typhoon Thompson
- Tyran
- T-Zer0

== U ==
- U.N. Squadron
- UFO: Enemy Unknown
- Ugh!
- Ultima III: Exodus
- Ultima IV: Quest of the Avatar
- Ultima V: Warriors of Destiny
- Ultima VI: The False Prophet
- Ultimate Basketball
- Ultimate Body Blows
- Ultimate Darts
- Ultimate Golf
- Ultimate Military Simulator
- Ultimate Pinball Quest
- Ultimate Ride, The
- Ultimate Soccer Manager
- Ultimative Software Manager, The
- Ultimate Super Skidmarks
- Ultra Violent Worlds
- Umut Tarlaları
- Uncle D's Con-Sound-Tration
- Uninvited
- Under Pressure
- Universal Monsters
- Universal Warrior
- Universal Warrior 2
- Universe
- Universe 3
- Unreal
- Untouchables, The
- Uridium 2
- Uropa 2
- Us N' Them
- Utopia: The Creation of a Nation

== V ==
- Valhalla and the Lord of Infinity
- Valhalla: Before the War
- Valhalla and the Fortress of Eve
- Vampire's Empire
- Vaxine
- Vector Championship Run
- Vectorball
- Vektor Storm
- Vengeance of Excalibur
- Venom Wing
- Venus The Flytrap
- Vermeer
- Verminator
- Veteran
- Vette!
- Victory
- Victory Road
- Videokid
- Vigilante
- Viking Child
- Viking Child 2
- Vikings
- Vindex
- Virocop
- Virtual GP
- Virtual Interceptor
- Virtual Karting
- Virtual Karting 2
- Virus (port of the game Zarch)
- Vital Light
- Vital Mind
- Vixen
- Viz: The Game
- Vortex
- Volfied
- Voodoo Nightmare
- Voyager
- Vroom
- Vroom Multiplayer

== W ==
- Wacky Races
- Walker
- Wall Street Wizard
- Wanderer 3D
- War in Middle Earth
- War in the Gulf
- War of the Lance
- Warhead
- Warlock: The Avenger
- Warlock's Quest
- Warlords
- Warm Up!
- Warp
- Warriors of Releyne
- WarWizard
- Warzone
- Wasted Dreams
- Watchtower
- Waterloo
- Waxworks
- Way of the Exploding Fist, The
- Wayne Gretzky Ice Hockey
- Web of Terror
- WEC Le Mans
- Weird Dreams
- Wembley International Soccer
- Wendetta 2175
- Wet
- Whale's Voyage
- Whale's Voyage 2
- Wheels on Fire
- Wheelspin
- When Two Worlds War
- Whirligig
- White Death
- Whizz
- Who Framed Roger Rabbit?
- Wibble World Giddy
- Wicked
- Wild Cup Soccer
- Wild Streets
- Wild West Seymour
- Wild West World
- Wild Wheels
- William Tell
- Window Wizard
- Windwalker
- Wing Commander
- WingNuts
- Wings
- Wings of Death
- Wings of Fury
- Winnie the Pooh in the Hundred Acre Wood
- Winter Camp
- Winter Games
- Winter Olympiad 88
- Winzer
- Wipe Out
- Wipeout 2097
- Wishbringer
- Witness, The
- Wiz'n'Liz
- Wizard Warz
- Wizard's Castle
- Wizardry VI: Bane of the Cosmic Forge
- Wizball
- Wizkid
- Wizmo
- Wizzy's Quest
- Wolfchild
- Wonder Boy in Monster Land
- Wonder Dog
- Wonderland
- Woody's World
- World Championship Boxing Manager
- World Championship Soccer
- World Cup Soccer: Italia '90
- World Cup USA '94
- World Games
- World of Arch
- World Soccer
- Worlds at War
- Worlds of Legend: Son of the Empire
- Worldwide Hunting
- Worms
- Worms: The Director's Cut
- Worthy
- Wrath of the Demon
- Wroom
- WWF European Rampage Tour
- WWF WrestleMania

== X ==
- Xarom
- Xenomorph
- Xenon
- Xenon 2: Megablast
- Xenophobe
- X-Fighter
- X-Fire
- Xiphos
- X-It
- XOR
- Xorron 2001
- X-Out
- XP8
- XPilot
- X-Ploit
- XR-35 Fighter Mission
- Xtreme Racing
- Xybots

== Y ==
- Yo! Joe!
- Yogi's Great Escape
- Yolanda
- Yuppi's Revenge

== Z ==
- Zak McKracken and the Alien Mindbenders
- Zany Golf
- Zarcan
- Zardoz
- Zarathrusta
- Zaxxon
- Zeewolf
- Zeewolf II
- Zeppelin: Giants of the Sky
- Zero Gravity
- Ziriax
- Zjyswav Hero of the Galaxy 3D
- Zombie Massacre
- Zombi
- Zone Warrior
- Zool
- Zool 2
- Zoom!
- Zork I
- Zork II
- Zork III
- Zork Zero
- Z-Out
- Z-Out 2
- Zyconix
- Zynaps
- Zyron
- Zzzep
