= X-It =

1994 video game

- Developer: Data Design Interactive
- Publisher: Psygnosis
- Producer: Greg Duddle
- Designers: Richard Hackett; Stephen Bond
- Artists: Dale Johnstone; Marcus Stringer
- Composer: Darren Wood
- Platforms: Amiga, MS-DOS
- Release: Amiga: EU: November 1994; MS-DOS: EU: 1994
- Genre: Puzzle
- Mode: Single-player

X-It (also known as Zonked) is a 1994 puzzle video game developed by Data Design Interactive (DDI) and published by Psygnosis for the Amiga and MS-DOS. The Amiga version was also distributed in Australia by Hot Point. The game stars a character named Bill, who was kidnapped and placed in a space junkyard maze by aliens who want to learn more about humans before launching an invasion against Earth. The player controls Bill across 120 levels, each one divided into eight ships that feature their own variety of obstacles. The goal on every level is to get each block into hole fillers to make a path around the exit, without getting blocks stuck against walls or other obstacles under a time limit.

DDI had previously worked for publisher Millennium Interactive on Pinkie prior to X-It. It was designed and programmed by a team within DDI called Flatline; Richard Hackett and Stephen Bond came up with the game's concept and acted as co-designers. The soundtrack was composed by Darren Wood. The game garnered average reception from critics. In 2006, a fan remake for Microsoft Windows titled X-It Again was released as freeware by Finnish group Puzzlehouse.

== Gameplay ==
Gameplay screenshot

X-It is a puzzle game that is played from a top-down perspective similar to Sokoban and Anarchy (1987). The premise revolves around a character named Bill, who was kidnapped and placed in a space junkyard maze by aliens who want to learn more about humans before launching an invasion against Earth. The player controls Bill across 120 levels, each one divided into eight ships that feature their own variety of obstacles. The goal on every level is to get each block into hole fillers to make a path around the exit, without getting blocks stuck against walls or other obstacles under a time limit. Each block has their own weight and characteristics.

There are multiple types of obstacles such as fixed pilars, immovable blocks, and ice that prevents blocks from stopping until they go past it. There are items scattered on the playfield to help the player with moving blocks, like tractor beams and teleporters. When a level is successfully completed, a password is shown onscreen. The player can replay a stage by entering the password at the corresponding screen. Later levels increase their number of obstacles and overall complexity. Between leves, the player participates in a bonus stage. The player starts with three lives, but falling through holes or the timer runs out results in a life lost. The player can skip a level, which will result in a life lost. The player has five continues to keep playing, but the game is over if all of them are used.

== Development and release ==
X-It was created by Data Design Interactive (DDI), a British game developer which had previously worked for publisher Millennium Interactive on Pinkie. The game was produced by Greg Duddle. It was designed and programmed by a team within DDI called Flatline; Richard Hackett and Stephen Bond came up with the game's concept and acted as co-designers. David Hackett, Marcus Stringer, and Richard Hackett also provided additional level design. Marcus Stringer was responsible for the graphic design, while Dale Johnstone was in charge of the rendered sequences. The soundtrack was composed by Darren Wood. Several staff members collaborated in the game's development process as well. The game was first published in Europe by Psygnosis for the Amiga in November 1994 (although December is also listed as release date). An MS-DOS version was also released by Psygnosis that year. The game was known as Zonked in early previews, and major gaming publications reviewed it as Zonked. The Amiga version was also distributed in Australia by Hot Point. In 2006, a fan remake for Microsoft Windows titled X-It Again was released as freeware by Jay Parker of Finnish group Puzzlehouse.

== Reception ==
Reception

Review scores
Publication	Score
Amiga Action	76%
Amiga Computing	70%
Amiga Format	79%
Amiga Power	80%
Computer and Video Games	48/100
Amiga Dream	81%
Amiga Games	81%
Amiga Joker	72%
Amiga Magazine	7/10
ACAR	75%
CU Amiga	58%
Datormagazin	3/5
The One Amiga	85%
Play Time	79%
Top Secret	7/10

X-It garnered average reception from critics. Writing for PC Joker and Amiga Joker, Joachim Nettelbeck reviewed both the MS-DOS and Amiga versions. Nettelbeck labelled it as a good variant of Sokoban, commending its audio and controls. He found the visuals stylish but unimpressive. The One Amiga's Andy Nuttall found its difficulty more balanced compared to Clockwiser. Nuttall also highlighted the game's variety, playability, and quality of the music. Amiga Games' Roland Gerhardt gave positive remarks to the game's audiovisual presentation, gameplay, short loading times, use of passwords, and gags. Play Time's Stephan Girlich felt that its length and above-average graphics gave the gameplay a modern touch.

Amiga Dream's Grégory Halliday deemed X-It a high-quality puzzle game for experience players and noted the difficulty level of certain puzzles, but nevertheless felt its visuals were simplistic. Datormagazin's Erika Hagberg considered its visuals okay, and found the game occasionally fun to play but mediocre. Amiga Action's Paul Roundell and Andy Sharp regarded it as a fun and enjoyable puzzle game, but Roundell expressed that its graphics do not "sell" the Amiga's capabilities. Amiga Format's Stephen Bradley called it a simple but well-executed game, citing its "solid" gameplay and the ability to move into different areas. Amiga Power's Mark Winstanley found the game more feature-packed compared to Sokoban and noted its difficulty, but he disapproved the visuals, music, strict time limit, lack of additional replay value, and similarity with other puzzle titles.

Australian Commodore & Amiga Review felt X-It contributed greatly to the "boxes and holes" game concept. They commended the game's visuals and animations, but found the bonus stages unexciting and the sound unmemorable. Amiga Computing's Tina Hackett expressed mixed opinions towards the graphics and audio but ultimately considered it an entertaining title regardless, citing its addictive playability and satisfying progression level. CU Amiga's Michael Traquir felt the game's overall difficulty offered no "real learning curve". Amiga Magazine's Lawrence van Rijn deemed the game easy to play, stating that it could compete with puzzle games like Boulder Dash (1984) and Bombuzal. Ferios of Polish publication Top Secret gave it a favorable outlook.
