= Rorke's Drift (video game) =

1990 video game

- DOS version cover art
- Developer(s): Plato
- Publisher(s): Impressions Games
- Platform(s): Atari ST, Amiga, MS-DOS
- Release: 1990
- Genre(s): Strategy
- Mode(s): Single-player

Rorke's Drift is a strategy video game for Atari ST, Amiga and MS-DOS home computers, released in 1990. The game is a recreation of the Battle of Rorke's Drift during the 1879 Anglo-Zulu War. The player assumes command of the British garrison at the Rorke's Drift shortly before the arrival of the 4,000-strong attacking Zulu force. The post's 137 defenders are rendered as individual characters which the player must order to perform actions. The game is played in real time and lasts from 4.30pm on 22 January 1879 until 7am the following morning. The game received mixed reviews, with critics praising the graphics and criticising the slow pace and complicated orders system.

== Gameplay ==
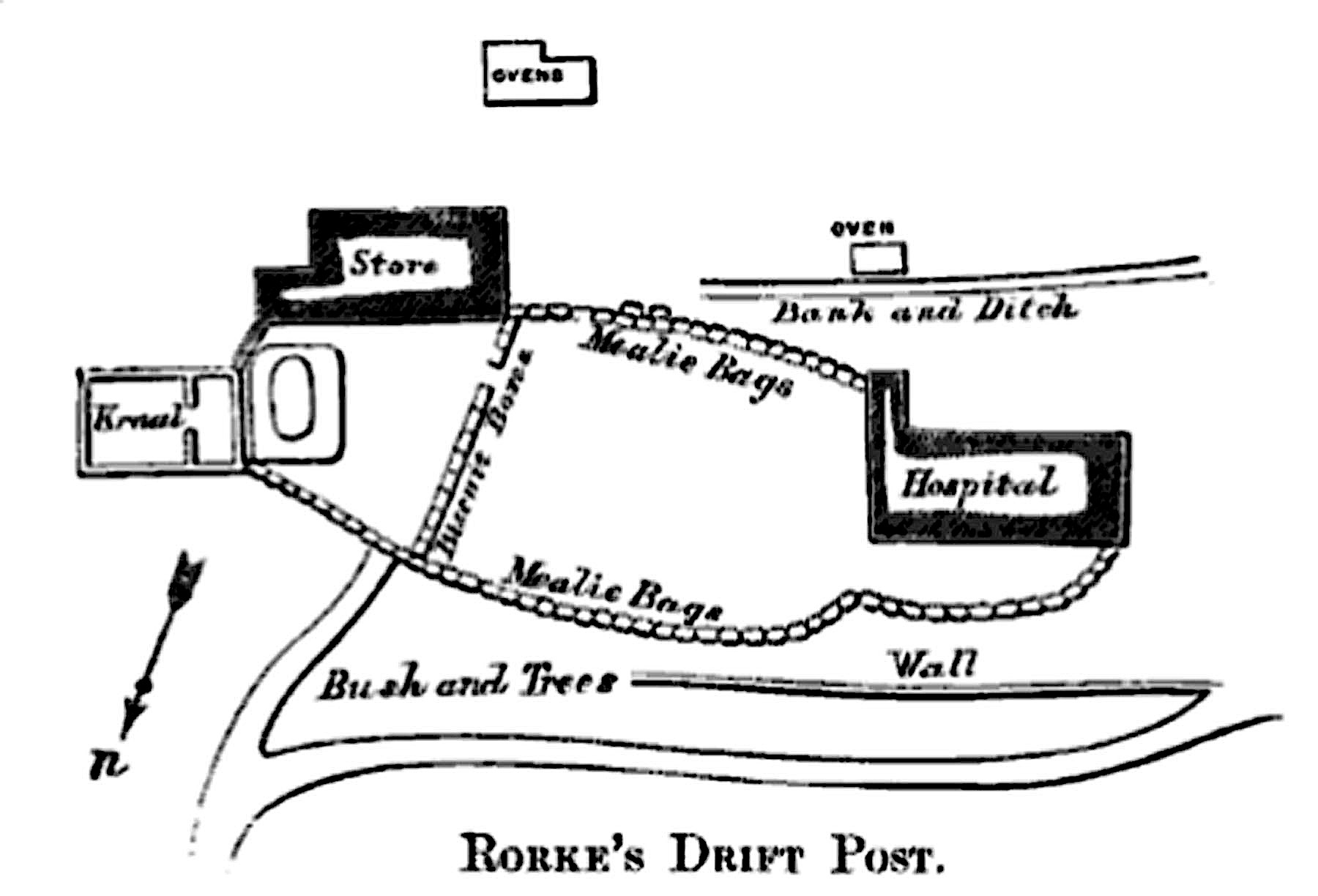
Layout of Rorke's Drift. The game presents an isometric 3D view of the battlefield from the south. A plan similar to this is shown in game as an overview map.

Rorke's Drift is a real-time strategy recreation of the Battle of Rorke's Drift, a defence of a mission post during the 1879 Anglo-Zulu War. The player takes command of a garrison of 137 British troops to defend the post against a Zulu force numbering up to 4,000. The game allows the player the choice of facing Zulu attacks as they came historically or in a randomised fashion.

The game starts at 4.30pm on 22 January 1879, at which time the mealie bag and biscuit box defences have been erected, and the player's first action is to issue orders to deploy their men to their fighting positions. The Zulu attacks begin an hour later and the game runs, in real time, to a conclusion at 7am on 23 January when the British garrison is relieved by the arrival of reinforcements. Victory is awarded to the player if any of their forces survive until the end.

A screenshot of a game in progress. Zulu and British characters are visible in the background. The bottom of the screen shows the menu options and the centre shows the orders menu for the selected character (a British private soldier).

The game is presented in isometric 3D view from the south of the mission post, the screen shows a section of the post and during gameplay the player can scroll the screen to view other parts. The player's command consists of 137 characters, a mix of soldiers (wounded and unwounded), officers, medics and quartermasters. There are 80 different frames of character position, depicting the men in kneeling, running, standing and fighting position in eight different directions. Each individual character has different statistics that affect their movement, shooting and hand-to-hand combat abilities. The player orders men individually by entering an orders mode that pauses gameplay and prevents the screen from moving. Orders are given by mouse on an illustrated on-screen menu and are carried out when the player unpauses the game. A "repeat order" function allows the player to issue the same order, individually, to more than one character. Orders include different speeds of movement, different firing positions, aiming, firing, reloading and fighting in hand-to-hand combat. Only soldiers ordered to aim at a target can fire, the chance of a hit depends on the ability of the soldier and the time spent aiming.

As well as the main screen the player can select a map icon to display a fixed overview of the post, a red cross icon to display the total of active, wounded and dead for each side and a clock icon which accelerates the game. During accelerated play, the battlefield is hidden and replaced by a clock and a display showing the number of wounded and dead on each side, the player can exit the screen at any time to return to the battlefield. As well as fighting the player must also manage the distribution of ammunition and tending of any wounded. The performance of the characters is affected by their wounds and any treatment received. The only audio in the game is a short burst of the song "Men of Harlech" (popularly associated with the battle depicted in the 1964 film Zulu) at the start of the game. The player is capable of saving a game in progress.

== Development and release ==
Rorke's Drift was designed by Edward Grabowski for the developer Plato, the strategy branch of publisher Impressions Games. The game, distributed by Pactronics, was released on the Atari, Amiga and MS-DOS platforms in 1990, and was re-released in 1994 by Tactix for the Amiga 500, Amiga 600 and Amiga 1200.

== Reception ==
Reception

Review scores
Publication	Score
ACE	AMI, AST: 700/1000
Amiga Computing	AMI: 80%
Amiga Format	AMI: 62%
Amiga Power	AMI: 44%
Joystick	DOS: 65%
The Games Machine (UK)	AMI: 34%
Amiga Joker	AMI: 21%
Commodore and Amiga Review	AMI: 81%
CU Amiga	AMI: 84%
Datormagazin	AMI: 3/10
Power Play	AMI, AST: 4%
The One Amiga	AMI: 78%
Your Amiga	AMI: 80%

Reviews of the game were mixed; Laurence Scotford of ACE reflected on this, noting that it is "the sort of game you either love or you hate." Some reviews discussed the moral standpoint of the game. Tony Dillon of CU Amiga questioned the moral position of the player "wiping out an under-equipped army fighting for their homeland" in a war in which Britain was the aggressor. This position was shared by the West German magazine Power Play, which accused the game of glorifying the British viewpoint. Dillon suggested that the player would have been assisted by the provision of more historical background in the game or manual, including details of the Zulu viewpoint; the lack of background information was also criticised by Paul Rigby of The Games Machine.

=== Graphics and performance ===
The graphics were praised for their quality, though some reviewers considered the presentation overly "cute". Dillon felt that the cuteness of the graphics detracted from the atmosphere of a serious war game. The French Joystick magazine deemed the graphics better than what was usually provided in war games. Adrian Pumphrey of Your Amiga warned that "dedicated strategists may find this game a little too colourful for their palates", but figured the game would appeal to "arcade minded players". Lucinda Orr of Amiga Computing observed that the graphics gave the game the feel of a table-top wargame, and Andy Smith for Amiga Format speculated that this was the concept the designer had in mind. A reviewer for ONE AMiga considered the game to be a good example of how war games can cross over into the mainstream. Smith remarked that the adherence to turn-based wargaming principles did not always work in the context of a real-time game, with characters stuck walking into one another until interrupted by the player. Some reviewers noted the jerkiness of the animations and cursor movements. Werner Hiersekorn for the German magazine Amiga Joker noted occasional system crashes.

=== Gameplay ===
The reception of the orders system was mixed. Orr felt that it gave the game a more personal feel, but Smith found it "unwieldy and awkward", citing a tediousness in the requirement of individually issuing orders to each man. Hiersekorn, Scotford, Smith, Hans Ekholm for Datormagazin and The One Amiga reviewer found the pace of the game and the ordering system too slow. Pumphrey singled out the sequence of orders required to fire a rifle as too long. Although Phang appreciated the "repeat order" command, Rigby suggested that a group ordering system would have been beneficial. Cam Winstanley for Amiga Power felt that a "fire at will" command would have been useful to avoid repetitive ordering.

While The One Amiga reviewer found the ordering menu intuitive, Rigby complained that the manual provided insufficient explanation for some of the commands, while others did not tally with the screen. Ekholm also criticised the lack of instruction in the manual. The freezing of the screen during the ordering mode was criticised by Smith and Rigby. The fixed isometric view came in for negative comment from Winstanley and Rigby, with the foreground buildings hiding some characters from view and the view making it difficult to judge ground distance. Rigby also thought the overview map could have been a more useful feature if it showed the positions of troops rather than just an image of the battlefield. Orr found the accelerated time mode was risky as the only indication of a Zulu attack was when casualty figures began to increase, at which point it was often too late for the player to direct shots at the Zulus.

Orr noted that with a confined battlefield it was difficult to develop any elaborate strategies and that the game was more about how the player chose to deploy their limited forces. However, Phang described the game as "an exercise in tactics to be enjoyed by those who are dedicated strategy fans, and those who are just looking for an enjoyable game". Smith noted that the game had limited replay value, with only one scenario available and it being only playable from the British side.
