= Voyager (1989 video game) =

1989 video game

- Developer: Ocean Software
- Publisher: Ocean Software
- Designers: Mike Crowley; Dan Gallagher
- Programmer: Dan Gallagher
- Writer: Grace Bracey
- Composer: Jonathan Dunn
- Platforms: Amiga, Atari ST, MS-DOS
- Release: 1989
- Genre: Vehicular combat
- Mode: Single-player

Voyager is a first-person sci-fi vehicular combat game developed and published by Ocean Software. It was released in 1989 for Amiga, Atari ST, and MS-DOS.

The game is set in 2032, when hostile aliens discover the Voyager 2 probe and launch a military expedition into the Solar System, establishing bases on Saturn's moons and destroying Earth's space defences. The player controls a returning space drifter who undertakes a lone campaign to repel the invaders, progressively fighting across the moons in a combat tank. Gameplay consists of fast, tactical battles that require destroying numerous enemy units while managing fuel, weapons, and collected equipment upgrades.

Voyager received generally positive reviews, with reviewers praising its fast, smooth filled-vector 3D graphics and fluid performance. They commonly described it as a modernised take on the Battlezone-style shoot 'em up formula that emphasised action over simulation, highlighting its atmospheric presentation, varied enemies, progressive levels, and blend of action with light strategic elements. Criticism included repetitive gameplay, limited innovation compared to earlier games, and shortcomings in sound design or pacing, although most reviewers considered it highly playable and technically impressive.

== Plot ==
Voyager is set in the year 2032 when an alien scout from the planet Roxiz discovers the Voyager 2 space probe and takes it back to their home world. This leads the Roxiz to launch a military expedition towards the Solar System, where they establish military bases on Saturn's moons to develop and stockpile weapons. Several human peace envoys sent to contact the Roxiz disappear. Meanwhile, Earth's space-based defences are destroyed, and humanity lacks the ability to build heavy weapons, leaving the situation desperate. The game frames the campaign as a tongue-in-cheek expendable one-man's desperate assault against overwhelming odds. The player's objective is to defeat the Roxiz forces and protect Earth. The player's character is Luke Snayles, a freebooter space drifter returning to the Solar System after a 50-year "investigative" exile. So Luke decides to eliminate the threat himself. Throughout the game they deploy from a mothership stationed at Phoebe and advance between Saturn's moons using warp gates.

== Gameplay ==
Voyager is a single-player 3D arcade-style vehicular combat game, similar to Battlezone or Starglider 2. The player controls the tank with a mouse or a joystick, and must use several keyboard keys to activate specific functions. The game is played across ten of Saturn's moons, each functioning as a self-contained battlefield. The player is deployed onto each moon in a combat tank, starting on the surface of Janus. The gameplay focus is on fast, tactical action, rather than simulation or just arcade. Levels take place in 3D environments built from filled polygon structures such as buildings and radar stations. Game visuals use simple, solid 3D shapes and limited animation. Gameplay combines shooting and strategy elements, requiring the player to destroy large numbers of enemy vehicles to progress, around 80 ground and air enemy units as well as obstacles per level. Different enemy types have distinct behaviours and weapon accuracy, and require specific weapons or tactics to defeat, while working with limited fuel. The tank initially carries only a laser, a limited supply of bombs, and basic energy weapons. The game encourages free-roaming combat and resource hunting, emphasising weapon management, positioning, and efficient clearing of enemies. The player can collect weapon pods and special equipment, including more powerful weapons, remote cameras, decoys, jammers, or temporary flight capability with a faster airborne skimmer. A cockpit interface provides radar, maps, and equipment switching. The mothership provides supplies and tactical assistance, such as long-range maps and intelligence on enemy placement. After clearing each moon, the player travels through a warp gate to the next, establishing the core gameplay loop with increasing difficulty.

== Development ==
Voyager was programmed by Dan Gallagher and co-designed with Mike Crowley, with music by Jonathan Dunn and story written by Grace Bracey. The game was published in first half of 1989 by British game published Ocean Software for Amiga (500 and 100) and Atari ST platforms. The game was published in English and also translated and localised in German and French. It was included in a 1990 Light Force four game compilation along with International Karate +, R-Type, and Batman (Atari ST) or Bio Challenge (Amiga). Then later ported to MS-DOS by Tim Cannell of Binary Designs in 1990. The game also saw a 1992 budget release as part of Ocean's Hit Squad low-end re-release label.

== Reception ==
Reception

Review scores
Publication	Score
ACE	862/1000
Aktueller Software Markt	35/50
Amiga Format	79%
Commodore User	85%
Computer and Video Games	85%
Génération 4	90%
The Games Machine (UK)	91/92%
The One	81%
Tilt	16/20
Zzap!64	94%
Power Play	60/100
ST/Amiga Format	76%
Jeux & Stratégie	90%
Datormagazin	7/10

Voyager received mostly positive and some more critical reviews.

The Games Machine gave Voyager their "Top Score" label, rating it at 91%/92% and praising the game's fluid performance and satisfying fast-paced action. They described it as a modernised take on Battlezone-style 3D tank combat, prioritising arcade gameplay over deeper simulation elements. They praised the visuals for smooth, fast solid-3D graphics and detailed enemy designs that evolve across stages, with strong audio and an effective soundtrack enhancing atmosphere. Although the core concept is described as somewhat dated, they concluded Voyager to be highly playable. Zzap!64 gave the game their "Sizzler" label with a 94% score. They praised the fast 3D engine, smooth animation, and dense on-screen information with the separate cassette soundtrack highlighted as exceptional. They noted a short learning curve for controls but emphasised strong longevity thanks to the ten large, progressively harder levels. Overall, they described Voyager as one of the most atmospheric and absorbing 3D space combat games of its time. Génération 4 gave the game their "gold" award with a 90% average score comparing it to Starglider 2 in concept and presentation. They emphasized the game's arcade intensity, praised the fast graphics, well-animated 3D solid polygons, especially during flight and moon transitions. They criticized the lack of in-game sound effects and music but still considered it a strong 16-bit debut for Ocean.

Commodore User rated the game 85%, praising its mix of strategy and shoot 'em up gameplay, impressive 3D graphics, varied enemies, and strong sound effects. They also noted it as slightly conservative and not fully polished visually. In the end, they described Voyager as a "great technical package" and concluded it was highly enjoyable and a good value for money. Andy Smith writing for Ace gave the game a score of 862/1000 and praised the game's smooth, fast, and colourful graphics and convincing 3D game world. They highlighted the tactical, fuel-limited gameplay and variety of upgrades as more engaging and strategic than typical Battlezone-style shooters, making Voyager entertaining over longer sessions. However, they also noted the game's repetitive structure and a lack of a distinctive hook. Similarly, Smith writing for Amiga Format rated the game at 79%, praising graphics and music and describing it as one of the better 3D shooters of its type but noting repetitiveness. Computer and Video Games gave the game 83%/85% ratings and described Voyager as a modernised take on the Battlezone formula expanding the standard shoot 'em up structure. They praised the fast large-scale 3D filled-vector graphics, heavier sound effects, and varied enemy encounters adding depth. Despite some early limitations while confined to ground travel, the game was considered to open up significantly once additional vehicles were obtained. The One rated the gate at 81%, describing the game as visually impressive, polished, and highly playable with a humorous storyline, praising the smooth graphics, vector presentation, and blend of action and searching. As a criticism, they pointed out occasional slow or sporadic pacing, mentioning waves of enemies as an example. ST/Amiga Format rated the game at 76% and considered it enjoyable. They noted that the gameplay prioritises speed and playability over graphical detail. They highlighted solid if simple visuals, limited animation, and competent effects. The game is described as long-lasting rather than quickly completed offering weeks of play and sustained interest. Tilt gave the game 16/20 points and praised the atmosphere and sense of immersion. They highlighted the solid 3D graphics, smooth animation, and detailed effects like enemy shadows, although noted smaller issues like the skies as too plain, audio mostly limited to effects and somewhat complex controls. They valued the mix of action and strategy and compared the game to Battlezone, Backlash, and Starglider 2. Overall, they described the game as high quality and engaging for long sessions.

Power Play summarised the game as "average" with a 60/100 score, noting solid technical presentation, including fast filled-vector 3D graphics, many enemies, and decent sound. However, they criticised the repetitive design and lack of originality, calling it a mediocre shooter and recommending alternatives with more depth. ASM gave the game 35 out of 50 points and described it as an upgraded but inferior remake of older games like Starglider 2 or Backlash. They praised the game's strong intro graphics, visual presentation and sound, but considered playability and overall value weaker with little gameplay innovation. They also criticised Voyager's story as being a thin framing device for the action. They describe the combat as constant but mechanically similar to earlier titles, with only minor additions like a crosshair or updated scanner. Jeux & Stratégie gave the game a score of 7/10 comparing it to Driller for its technical presentation and described the 3D graphics as simple but effective. They summarized the game as expansive and demanding, but noted the lack of originality. Datormagazin gave it a rating of 7/10 describing it as a largely successful attempt to create a strong 3D action experience. They praised the fast and high quality graphics, but criticized the limited variety of sound design with explosions being the primary audio element.

Amiga Joker described Light Force compilation as "great" and one of the best game compilations at the time. Computer and Video Games described it as a "tasty package" praising Amiga version as the "best Amiga compilation available at present" featuring better graphics and sound compared to the Atari ST versions. Amiga Mania rated Voyager at 70% describing it as "enjoyable vintage style game", but criticized simple graphics, lack of features and repetitive levels.

Amiga Power rated the 1992 re-release at 80% describing it as a straight-forward Battlezone-style shoot-em-'up. They praised the game for being atmospheric and well-presented. CU Amiga gave the game 65% and described it as an improvement over Battlezone albeit with by now outdated visuals. They noted that the game lacked depth and that the reviews during the original release did not sufficiently remark on its repetitive gameplay.
