= Red Zone (1992 video game) =

1992 video game

- Developer: Psygnosis
- Publisher: Psygnosis
- Platform: Amiga
- Release: EU: August 1992; NA: 1992
- Genre: Racing simulator
- Mode: Single-player

Red Zone is a 1992 racing video game developed and published by Psygnosis for the Amiga.

== Gameplay ==
Red Zone is a game about simulating motorcycle racing. The bike can be controlled with either a joystick or a mouse. Manual or automatic transmission can be chosen. Three modes are available: practice, single race, and season. The game features 10 tracks, eight in Europe, one in Brazil, and one in Mexico. There are six other competitors on the track during a race. The game features damage modelling, the bike loses performance the further it's damaged. Other riders can be knocked off their bikes if they're collided with.

== Reception ==
Reception

Review scores
Publication	Score
Aktueller Software Markt	6/12
Amiga Action	79%
Amiga Computing	30%
Amiga Format	64%
CU Amiga	72%
Génération 4	38%
The One	87%

Red Zone received generally average reviews from critics. Amiga Action said the game is "a marginal improvement over Team Suzuki." and concluded that the game is "Reasonable but possessing nothing special over its more illustrious predecessors." The One said "Red Zone is quite simply the most exciting bike-racing game yet." CU Amiga said the graphics have more detail than MicroProse's Formula One Grand Prix but the game runs sluggishly with all the graphic options on. The game was also compared to Gremlin's Team Suzuki: "Red Zone is very good in some areas, but limps along with others. Its biggest problem is that visually it is too slow to be anywhere near as playable as Gremlin's effort, which is why I would go for the latter [...]". Amiga Computing summarized: "The whole point of getting rid of excess detail is to speed up the gameplay, but the change is practically unnoticeable. Sorry Psygnosis but it's a turkey." Aktueller Software Markt called the game mediocre that could have been good with smoother graphics and animation. Amiga Format said: "This control system, accurate as it may be, is just too complicated for a game of this kind." Génération 4 called the game a pale clone of Team Suzuki. Amiga World included Red Zone in a 1994 list of the worst Amiga games of all time, writing that the play control of the game was too poor to be playable.
