= Roadkill (video game) =

1994 video game

Roadkill is a 1994 futuristic combat racing game developed by Vision Software for the Amiga platform.

== Gameplay ==
The game is set in a world where races are broadcast as violent spectator entertainment to mass audiences. Players begin by selecting from a roster of vehicles, each differing in performance, durability, and other characteristics — a choice the reviewer emphasizes as requiring careful consideration. Before each race, a qualifying round determines the player's starting position on the grid. During races, objectives are threefold: destroying as many opponents as possible (the primary source of in-race earnings), finishing the race alive, and placing as high as possible for additional prize money and track record bonuses. Weapons and power-ups, including homing missiles, can be found scattered across the track or are awarded by race officials.

== Reception ==
British magazine CU Amiga reviewed the game twice, once for regular Amiga and once for Amiga CD32, with the reviewers scoring it at 85%. Likewise, Amiga Power and Amiga Format also reviewed the game twice. The game was also reviewed for Amiga Computing.

Sebastian Babczyński who reviewed it for the Polish magazine Świat Gier Komputerowych was largely enthusiastic, but raised two significant criticisms: the in-game money and reward system felt purposeless, and the lack of a multiplayer mode — considered a notable drawback for an Amiga title — brought the gameplay score down from a potential 9 to a 7. In a postscript, the reviewer noted a last-minute decision to raise the final score to 8.

The game also received numerous other reviews in contemporary game video press (in titles such as German magazines like Amiga Joker (twice) and Play Time.
