= R3 (video game) =

1995 video game

R3: The Art of Rocketry
- Developer(s): Bruce Webster
- Platform(s): Amiga
- Release: 1995
- Genre(s): Multidirectional shooter

R3: The Art of Rocketry is a video game written by Bruce Webster for the Amiga released in 1995. It was a playable demo on the coverdisks of Amiga Power (issue 54) in October 1995 and on Amiga Format (issue 89) in September 1996.

The game was initially released as shareware, but the author later released the full game as freeware on Aminet in 2000. The registered version included Tritus from Davin Pearson, a three-player competitive Tetris-inspired game, much in the same manner of the game Super Foul Egg.

== Gameplay ==
R3 is a Thrust clone where the player navigates a flying craft by rotating applying power in that direction. Vertical movement is affected by gravity.

R3 adds the ability to purchase new and better craft, which are organised into five classes. Each craft in the same class has similar characteristics, such as class 3 being large on the cargo space and shields, but low on missiles and low on thrust power. Each class has three craft within it, the weakest having lower everything (engine power, gun range, gun speed, cargo space, shields) but being much cheaper.
