= Jetstrike =

1994 video game

- Developer: Shadow Software
- Publisher: Rasputin Software
- Platforms: Amiga, CD32, MS-DOS
- Release: 1994
- Genre: Scrolling shooter
- Modes: Single-player, multiplayer

Jetstrike is a horizontally scrolling shooter computer game published in 1994. It was originally released for the Amiga, and also for the Amiga 1200 as an AGA version, then released again on the Amiga CD32.

== Gameplay ==
Jetstrike is a side scrolling shooter computer game, similar in feel to Defender (1981) and Wings of Fury (1987) with a wrap around screen and left-to-right-to-left turning across the landscape. Jetstrike includes 200 aircraft to choose from each with a slightly different feel and almost as many weapons with which to shoot down aircraft or blow up ground-based enemies.

== Reception ==
The CD32 version was ranked the 28th best game of all time by Amiga Power in 1996.
