= Banshee (video game) =

1994 video game

- Developer: Core Design
- Publisher: Core Design
- Platforms: Amiga, Amiga CD32
- Release: 1994
- Genre: Scrolling shooter
- Modes: Single-player, multiplayer

Banshee is a vertically scrolling shooter released for the Amiga 1200 and Amiga CD32 in 1994 by Core Design.

== Reception ==
Reception

Review scores
Publication	Score	
Publication	Amiga	CD32
Amiga Action	86/100	88/100
Amiga Computing	89/100	88/100
Amiga Format	90/100	90/100
Amiga Power	89/100	90/100
Amiga User International	88/100	83/100
Commodore User	91/100	90/100
Computer and Video Games	85/100	90/100
GamesMaster		83/100
The One	89/100	
Amiga CD32		87/100

Both the Amiga and CD32 versions of Banshee were released to very favorable reviews.

The game was one of Amiga Action's top 20 games of the year 1994, at No. 20. It was ranked the 39th best Amiga game of all time by Amiga Power in 1996.
