= Star Command =

Star Command may refer to:

- Space Training and Readiness Command, or STAR Command, a field command of the United States Space Force.
- Starship Troopers (board wargame), a 1976 board game by Avalon Hill.
- The base of operations on Jason of Star Command, a 1978–1981 children's television show.
- Star Command (toy line and cartoon), a line of toys, action figures, and cartoons for American television in the mid 1980s.
- Star Command (1988 video game), a computer game for the Amiga and IBM PC based on the board game.
- Star Command (film), a 1996 film by Melinda M. Snodgrass, directed by Jim Johnston
- Star Command: Revolution, a 1997 DOS computer game published by GT Interactive.
- The base of operations on Buzz Lightyear of Star Command, a 2000–2001 television show featuring the character from Toy Story, as well as the 2022 animated film Lightyear.
- Star Command (2013 video game), a video game released by Warballoon in 2013 for iOS.
