= Slayer (video game) =

1988 video game

- European cover art
- Developer(s): Imperial Software
- Publisher(s): Hewson Consultants
- Platform(s): Amiga, Atari ST, Commodore 64
- Release: 1988
- Genre(s): Scrolling shooter
- Mode(s): Single-player

Slayer is a horizontally scrolling shooter developed by Imperial Software for the Amiga, Atari ST, and Commodore 64. Hewson Consultants published the game in 1988. The game consists of three levels, each with a boss which must be defeated at the end. Power-ups such as bonus weapons and shields scattered around the levels.

In a 1990 review for Amiga Computing magazine, critic Stewart C. Russell scored the game 32%, concluding that Slayer is "the Pitts", with poor gameplay.
