= The Three Musketeers (1987 video game) =

- Developer: Greve Graphics
- Publisher: American Action
- Composer: Lars Hård
- Platforms: Commodore 64, Amiga, MS-DOS
- Release: 1987
- Genre: Adventure

The Three Musketeers is an adventure video game developed by American Action based on the 1844 novel of the same name by Alexandre Dumas. The game was published in 1987 by Greve Graphics for the Amiga, Commodore 64, and MS-DOS The music is by Lars Hård.
