= Slam Tilt =

1996 video game

- Developer: Liquid Dezign HB
- Publisher: 21st Century Entertainment
- Platforms: Amiga, Windows
- Release: 1996: Amiga; 1997: Windows
- Genre: Pinball

Slam Tilt is a pinball simulation video game developed by Swedish studio Liquid Dezign HDB and published by 21st Century Entertainment in 1996 for AGA compatible Amiga computers and in 1997 for Microsoft Windows as Slamtilt Pinball. The game is the last in a series of Amiga pinball titles released by the publisher, including Pinball Fantasies and Pinball Dreams.

== Gameplay ==
All four Slam Tilt tables

The Amiga release of Slam Tilt featured four themed tables: 'Mean Machines', 'The Pirate', 'Ace of Space' and 'Night of the Demon'. Each table features an LCD panel at the top of the screen upon which scores and animations are displayed. The game also offers extra challenges through 'video modes' in which the player must use the LCD panel and table to complete further objectives.

== Reception ==
Reception

Review scores
| Publication | Score |
|---|---|
| Amiga Computing | 90% (Amiga) |
| Amiga Format | 93% (Amiga) |
| Amiga Power | 90% (Amiga) |
| PC PowerPlay | 68% (PC) |

The Amiga version of Slam Tilt was received positively by reviewers. Tina Hackett for Amiga Computing praised the game as an "excellent title" at the same technical and graphical quality of previous pinball titles from the publisher. Richard Jones for Amiga Format said Slam Tilt was "the biggest, best and most imaginative pinball game on the Amiga". Tim Norris for Amiga Power also provided high praise for the game, while noting its similarities to other titles from the publisher. Amiga Power ultimately ranked the game as the 13th best Amiga game of all time.

The PC port of Slam Tilt received mediocre reviews. Gareth Jones of PC PowerPlay stated "overall, (the game) is quite good, the ball dynamics are well done and realistic, and the tables are well laid out", but the presentation suffered from a "partial close up of half the table", making it "difficult to aim at ramps or chutes you can't see".

== Legacy ==
A 3D version of Slam Tilt titled SlamTilt Resurrection was released in 1999 for Windows. The revision was developed by Ganymede Technologies and published in Europe by 21st Century Entertainment. In the United States, the game was republished as a budget title by Cardoza Entertainment under the name Avery Cardoza's Slam Tilt Pinball.

SlamTilt Resurrection only includes the 'Night of the Demon' and 'The Pirate' tables from the original game. These tables are fully redesigned, except for the scoring and layout, with 3D high-resolution graphics at screen resolutions for up to 1600x1200 with 32-bit colors and overhauled ball physics.
