= Wings of Fury =

1987 video game

- Developer: Steve Waldo
- Publisher: Broderbund
- Platforms: Apple II, Amiga, Amstrad CPC, Commodore 64, MS-DOS, Game Boy Color, NEC PC-9801, X68000
- Release: 1987; December 28, 1999 (GBC)
- Genre: Scrolling shooter
- Mode: Single-player

Wings of Fury is a scrolling shooter, with some combat flight simulator elements, originally written for the Apple II by Steve Waldo and released in 1987 by Broderbund. The player assumes the role of a pilot of an American F6F Hellcat plane aboard the USS Wasp in the Pacific during World War II. It was also released in 1989 for the X68000 and in 1990 for Amstrad CPC, Commodore 64, Amiga, and MS-DOS compatible operating systems. A Game Boy Color version was published in 1999.

== Gameplay ==
The game is a horizontally scrolling shooter set over a number of World War II missions. In each mission, the player must protect an aircraft carrier from attacks by Japanese planes. The goal is to defeat the Japanese by destroying enemy bunkers, guns and barracks on a series of islands and killing enemy soldiers either with bombs or by machine guns. The weapons to complete these objectives, besides machine guns, are a limited number of bombs, rockets and torpedoes. On some missions, the player must also sink Japanese vessels, such as destroyers, battleships, and aircraft carriers. The player has a finite amount of fuel and munitions, which can be replenished by returning to the carrier. The player's aircraft can be destroyed by accumulated damage from enemy fire or by crashing into the terrain.

== Reception ==
Computer Gaming World stated that the game had "some of the best action graphics pulled out of the Apple in recent memory", and concluded that Wings of Fury was "an exciting, memorable game for anyone remotely interested in action games". The game received 4 out of 5 stars in Dragon.

=== Reviews ===
- Zero (October 1990)
- Raze (December 1990)
- Amiga Format (November 1990)
- Commodore User (February 1990)
- Tilt (March 1990)
- Zzap! (November 1990)
- Commodore Format (November 1990)
- Power Play (November 1990)
- Computer and Video Games (May 2000)
- Amiga Power (May 1991)
- Amiga World (November 1990)
- Amiga Computing (December 1990)
- Fire & Movement #76
