= Zeewolf =

1994 video game

- Zeewolf cover art
- Developer(s): Binary Asylum
- Publisher(s): Binary Asylum
- Designer(s): Andy Wilton
- Composer(s): Allister Brimble
- Platform(s): Amiga
- Release: 1994
- Genre(s): Shoot 'em up
- Mode(s): Single-player

Zeewolf is a single-player 3D shoot 'em up computer game released for the Amiga platform in November 1994 by Binary Asylum. A Sega Mega Drive version was planned but never released. The player is tasked with flying a helicopter gunship over 32 combat missions.

A sequel, Zeewolf 2: Wild Justice followed in 1995.

== Gameplay ==
The player flies an attack helicopter (and occasionally other aircraft) over 32 missions. Objectives include locating targets, destroying enemy units and buildings, transporting friendly vehicles and rescuing hostages. Some objectives are time limited. The player is given a finite number of lives. The player's craft can be destroyed by accumulated damage from enemy fire or from colliding with structures or terrain. The helicopter is equipped with cannon, rockets and guided air-to-air missiles. Fuel and ammunition are finite and the player has limited funds and locations in which to refuel or buy ammunition.

The game allows control by joystick or mouse. Under joystick control pressing in a direction causes the aircraft to orient and travel in that direction and the craft automatically maintains altitude. Under mouse control the mouse's motion tilts the aircraft around the axis of the rotors. The aircraft can only pitch and yaw; it cannot roll. The mouse buttons control weaponry and throttle. The game enforces a flight ceiling at which the throttle will not increase altitude.

Zeewolf uses a wraparound map in which the landscape endlessly repeats. An in-game map shows the location of the player within the landscape.

== Development ==
The concept was developed by Andy Wilton with additional programming by Jim Gardner. The levels were designed by Andy Smith and Bob Wade. Allister Brimble composed the title music and sound effects.

The terrain is constructed from an undulating landscape of fixed size tiles. The 3D engine renders vehicles, ships, buildings, trees, hostages and projectiles as solid polygons with shadow effects. The game uses a horizontal camera angle where only a boxed section of the terrain centred on the player's position is visible. This limitation in depth is necessary to achieve an acceptable frame rate with the stock Amiga hardware.

== Reception ==
Reception

Review scores
Publication	Score
Amiga Action	85%
Amiga Computing	90%
Amiga Format	90%
Amiga Power	74%
Computer and Video Games	91/100
Edge	8/10
