= Scorpion (video game) =

1989 video game

- Developer: Digital Magic Software
- Publisher: Digital Magic Software
- Platform: Amiga
- Release: 1989
- Genres: Platform, shoot 'em up

Scorpion is a platform/shoot 'em up video game developed and published by Digital Magic Software for the Amiga in 1989. The game was also re-released as Fly Fighter, with another title screen and another order of levels.

== Gameplay ==
The player fights hordes of enemies while traversing five side-scrolling levels, such as a harbour, jungle and ice land, each of which is guarded by a powerful boss. The player character attacks enemies by firing energy bolts from their fingers.

== Plot ==
The protagonist Scorpion is ostensibly fighting to rescue the kidnapped Princess of Scorpia. In a surprise ending, Scorpion kills the evil princess, revealing herself to be her good sister and now-sole heir to the throne.

== Reception ==
The game received the ratings of 93% in Amiga Computing, 69% in Computer and Video Games, 62% in The Games Machine, 60% in CU Amiga, and 47% in The One. According to Amiga Computing, "Everything about Scorpion screams quality and style, except for the box illustration which is a little iffy. The game is a zany Gryzor cum Green Beret hybrid with deliriously large, fast characters and plenty of bit noises." Computer and Video Games called it "a competently executed game, let down by some easily corrected errors, and suffer[ing] from not enough outside criticism before release."
