= Sword of Aragon =

1989 video game

- Developer: Strategic Simulations
- Publisher: Strategic Simulations
- Designers: Kurt Myers; Russell Shilling
- Platforms: MS-DOS, Amiga
- Release: NA: 1989 (DOS); NA: 1990 (Amiga)
- Genres: 4X turn-based strategy and role-playing game
- Mode: Single-player

Sword of Aragon is both a turn-based strategy game and role-playing game developed and published in 1989 by Strategic Simulations. It is also considered to be of the 4X genre. Set in the fictional country Aragon, the games casts its protagonist as the duke of a city named Aladda. After assuming rule over the city and avenging his father's death, the protagonist embarks on a quest to unify the land through conquest. Accomplishing this goal entails developing cities, recruiting armies, and directing the troops on the fields of battle to victory. First published for MS-DOS, the game was ported to Amiga machines. Reception towards Sword of Aragon tended to be more positive than negative; reviewers called it an exciting game, but criticized its method of copy protection and cited problems with its documentation. There were also opinions that the game was more of a niche product, catering to hardcore strategists.

== Background ==
Sword of Aragon is a "strategic fantasy role-playing adventure" video game published in 1989. The game's setting is the fictional country Aragon. A powerful human empire once held sway over the land, but infighting and raids by monsters such as orcs, goblins, and titans have broken it apart. The protagonist is the son of the Duke of Aladda, ruler of a city that used to be glorious under the old empire. The duke died during a raid by orcs and tasked his son through his will to fulfill his dream of reunifying the land. To achieve this goal, the young duke builds up his cities and expands his army, conquering or allying with other cities and races. Furthermore, he recovers three artifacts required to claim the throne, slays a dragon, and destroys the strongholds of monsters that plague the land. Eventually, he deposes the ruthless Emperor of the Tetradan Empire, Lucinian IV, and assumes the Aragonian throne.

== Gameplay ==
Sword of Aragon's maps comprise hexagonal arrangement of squares. Several units, up to a limit, can be stacked together in one hex.

The player begins a game by choosing a character class for the protagonist. The choices are warrior, knight, mage, priest, and ranger. Each class has an affinity to a certain class of soldier—warriors are more apt in leading infantry, and knights, cavalry. During battles, mages, rangers, and priests can also cast spells that damage foes, alter terrain, and heal friendly forces. The player can hire commanders of these classes to accompany the protagonist in his quest. After winning a number of battles, the player's character might receive offers of service from such commanders as well.

The game is principally split between city management and tactical combat. Gameplay is turn-based, alternating between player and computer, and much of the game is played on the World Map, a representation of the land of Aragon. Each turn on this map represents a month in the game. The map shows cities and the player's units; unexplored areas are blanked out until they have been explored by the player's units. By using the keyboard and mouse, the player moves a cursor to select units and cities, and issue orders via keystrokes. Cities under the player's control provide monthly income, which is supplemented by tributes from vassals and loot from battles. Income from a city is improved by expending funds to develop the city's economic sectors, such as agriculture and mining, or by increasing taxation. Tax rates, however, affect the loyalty of citizens; high taxes in a city lead to a decreasing population.

Armies are recruited in the cities, and their maintenance contributes to the monthly expenditure. Troops consist of infantry, cavalry, and bowmen. The game enters the tactical battle phase when enemies attack one of the player's cities that is garrisoned with troops, and when the player's forces move onto a hostile city. Encounters might also take place as the player's forces move on the World Map. On such occasions, the game switches the display to a large-scale map of the encounter. The battle maps differ from the World Map in that each spot has a limit on its number of occupants—a stacking limit. The player and computer take turns to deploy and move their forces. Units move at their standard pace or at a forced march to cover greater distances per turn in battles. Certain terrain gives defensive bonuses to their occupants, reducing the damage they suffer when coming under attack. Offensives take the form of melee, charges, missiles, and magic. The player has the option of letting the computer take control of his or her army to fight the battle. The game switches back to the World Map after a battle has concluded. Units that survive a battle gain experience points, improving their combat abilities on attaining certain numbers of experience points. They, with the exception of commanders, can also train in cities to improve their experience. Video games designer Alan Emrich considered Sword of Aragon's gameplay typical of the "eXplore, eXpand, eXploit and eXterminate" nature of the 4X genre.

== Development ==
Sword of Aragon was developed and published by Strategic Simulations, Inc., a video game company that dominated the 1980s market for digital wargames. Their products typically "copied the board game formula without adding revolutionary new elements." Most strategy games at this time featured hexagon-based maps and a sequence of turns among players. Sword of Aragon plainly exhibits the influence of traditional board games in its design. Its maps are laid out in hexes, and the concept of stacking limits plays a strong part in the game's strategies. Written in Microsoft QuickBASIC and other languages, Sword of Aragon features a copy protection system that uses the game manual. On starting the game, the icon of an Aragonian city is displayed, along with a cue for a word in the manual's description of that city; a separate poster identifies the cities with their icons. The game proceeds only after the correct answer has been entered.

== Reception ==
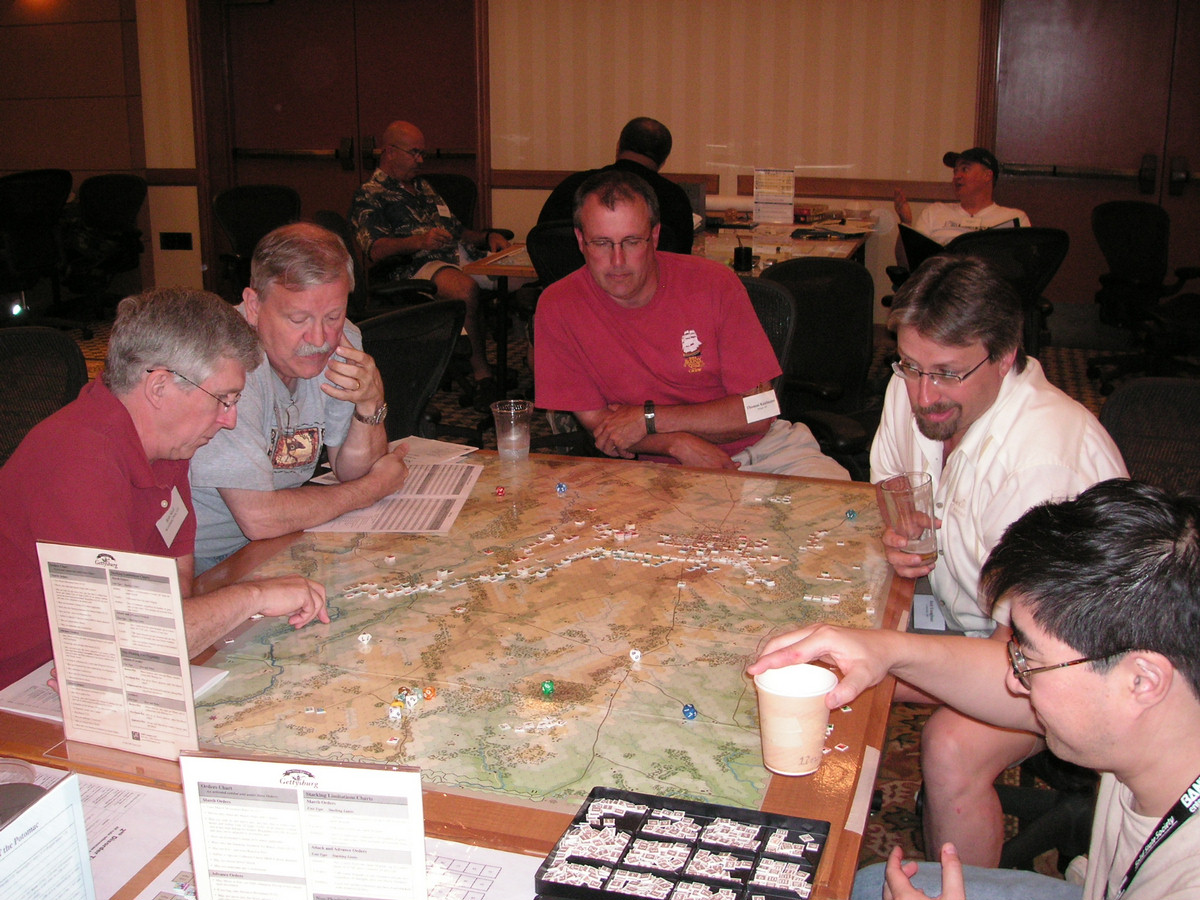
Sword of Aragon's mechanics followed closely those of tabletop wargames—hex maps and stacking limits (as seen in this picture of a tabletop wargaming session).

Sword of Aragon was released when fantasy-themed wargames were gaining popularity and computer wargames were starting to flourish as the rules of the board games grew in complexity. The digital versions were simpler in terms of their gameplay, as parts of the complex mechanics were handled by computers instead. Freed of dice rolling, complex calculations, and coordination of the sequence of play, casual gamers were more amenable to playing these games. According to Advanced Computer Entertainment's John Minson, Sword of Aragon complied with part of this trend; its huge complicated set of rules would have made it an unplayable board game, but by hiding its mechanics from the player, the digital version could be played by anyone. However, as Minson further explained, the scope of the game was too large for casual gamers to handle, overwhelming them with "the number of factors under their control", and hardcore gamers are more likely to appreciate the game's complexity.

In the January 1990 edition of Dragon (Issue 153), Hartley, Patricia, and Kirk Lesser believed that while the game was exciting, it suffered several design flaws that made the game too difficult for them. They found that the computer-controlled enemies constantly outpaced their economy and military might, and the game gave them no immediate opportunity to retreat their army when ambushed by superior forces, forcing them to suffer heavy losses.

In the February–March 1990 edition of Games International (Issue 13), Dave Morris found that the programming did not allow the enemy to play intelligently, pointing out that "even on Expert level your opponents will be just as dumb — there'll just be more of them." He was also disappointed by the game's graphics. Morris concluded by giving the gameplay a poor rating of 5 out of 10 and the graphics an even poorer 4 out of 10, saying, "Fighting a succession of poor opponents became repetitious, and its almost impossible to lose a battle even if the odds are stacked against you."

Compute!'s Adam Starkweather found it too easy in later stages of the game, as his character's well-developed armies "steamroll" their way through the opposition. The Lessers and Amiga Joker's Werner Hiersekorn felt the game ran slow on their computers, while Starkweather reflected that battles could take up to one and a half hours to complete. In 1990 and 1993 Computer Gaming World gave the game three-plus stars out of five, stating that it had "high playability".

Several video game observers doubted the classification of Sword of Aragon as a role-playing game. Science fiction and fantasy novelist Orson Scott Card and Amiga Computing's Lucinda Orr considered it more of a strategy than a role-playing game.

John Minson of ACE was of like mind, and further elaborated that unlike the Dungeon and Dragon series of video games, Sword of Aragon failed to inspire players to identify themselves with the characters, giving a "coldly mechanical experience" instead.

Datormagazin's Hans Ekholm thought otherwise, saying the gameplay did not require any strategy, and considered Sword of Aragon "a fantasy role-playing/adventure game and nothing else".

Critics had minor criticisms with the game's quality when comparing to its contemporaries. Minson called its interface "old-fashioned", and Computer Gaming World said it was "clunky" and "marginal", a description it also gave the game's graphics. Graphically, Orr and Zzap!64's Phil King found the game "primitive", though "adequate". More troubling to several reviewers was the game's copy protection system. Ekholm was not pleased that he had to unfold a flimsy poster to identify the requested city. His copy was falling apart after several identifications. The game further frustrated him when it failed to acknowledge the correct key. The provided hints were incorrect, a situation also experienced by the Lessers. The inaccuracies were not restricted to the copy protection. Starkweather pointed out discrepancies in the documentation—several features of the game were either not explained or wrongly documented.

Ekholm dismissed Sword of Aragon for its flawed copy protection and perceived lack of strategy. Hiersekorn was more condemning; rating the game poorly for its graphics and sound, and confused by its presented lists of military and economic data, he called the game a "cheap clone". Regardless, such issues did not deter other reviewers from praising the game. Pleased with the large number of options to manage their cities and to order their armies in combat, they felt the game was deep and offered many exciting moments; Kritzen judged the system "challenging and ultimately rewarding." According to Retro Gamer magazine, "Sword of Aragon is considered by many to be the best fantasy wargame ever." Starkweather was equally pronounced in his opinion. He called Sword of Aragon addictive and was willing to overlook issues with the game, finding pleasure in formulating strategies and tactics to overcome the enemy.

In a review of Sword of Aragon in Black Gate, John ONeill said "Sword of Aragon is a very hard game, and a lot of reviewers griped about it for that reason. But it's also full of surprises. Gutsy military victories and a generous, princely spirit are both absolutely essential to winning, but along the way you can find three powerful artifacts that will make claiming the throne a lot easier. You also get to slay a dragon, demolish the titan stronghold, and depose the cruel Emperor of the Tetradan Empire, and eventually assume the Aragonian throne. It's a long, painful road, but an enormously satisfying one."

== Other reviews ==
- Shadis #1 (Jan., 1990)
