= The SuperCan =

1986 video game

The SuperCan (also known as Captured) is a platform game developed by Greve Graphics for the Commodore 64 and published in 1986 by American Action. The music in The SuperCan was the first on the C64 to include single-channel delay.
