= Super Methane Bros. =

1993 video game

- Original author: Apache Software
- Developer: Mark Page
- Initial release: 1993; 33 years ago (Amiga)
- Stable release: 2.0.0 / 2021; 5 years ago
- Platform: Amiga, Amiga CD32, Windows, Linux, RISC OS
- Type: One or two player Platform game
- License: GPLv2
- Website: https://methane.sourceforge.net/

Amiga screenshot of Level 9.

Super Methane Bros. is an action video game released by Apache Software for the Amiga in 1993. It is similar in gameplay to Taito's 1986 arcade game, Bubble Bobble. Contemporary reviewers compared it to Data East's 1991 title, Tumblepop.

== Gameplay ==
The protagonists of the game, Puff and Blow, each have a Methane Gas Gun which fires a cloud of immobilising gas. If this comes into contact with a bad guy, he will be absorbed into the gas and then float around the screen for a limited time. Bad guys are harmless in this state. Puff and Blow must suck the floating gas clouds into their guns and blast them out against a vertical surface. Bad guys then turn into bonuses which can be collected.

== Reception and legacy ==
Super Methane Bros was received mixed with 72% in Amiga Power issue 39 from July 1994.

With permission from Apache Software Ltd a modern port under GPLv2 with the original assets was released in 2001 by Mark Page. This game has ports for Microsoft Windows, Linux and RISC OS. The source code and project is hosted on SourceForge, latest update was in 2021.

In 2009 an iOS version was released by Mobila Interactive, LLC.

Between 2005 and May 2017 Super Methane Bros. was downloaded from SourceForge alone over 48,000 times.
