= Guardian (video game) =

- Developer: Acid Software
- Publisher: Guildhall Leisure Services
- Programmer: Mark Sibly
- Artist: Hans Butler
- Composer: Anthony Milas
- Platforms: Amiga CD32, Amiga 1200
- Release: EU: 1994
- Genre: 3D shooter
- Mode: Single-player

Guardian is a 3D shoot 'em up video game developed by Acid Software that released in 1994. It was released for the Amiga CD32 game console and later converted to the Amiga 1200. Originally previewed in the press under the name SibWing with similarities to the Super NES game Star Fox, the final game was a 3D update of the 1981 arcade game Defender.

Guardian is one of the few Amiga CD32 games to be programmed for the CD32 first and then ported in stripped-down form to the Amiga computers.

== Reception ==
Guardian was lauded by Amiga Power. In the penultimate issue of the publication in August 1996, Guardian was rated the third best Amiga game ever in a Top 100 feature compiled by Amiga Power staff past and present.
