= Sky High Stuntman =

1991 video game

- Amiga version cover
- Publisher: Codemasters
- Platforms: Amiga, Atari ST, Commodore 64, ZX Spectrum
- Release: UK: 1991
- Genre: Action
- Mode: Single-player

Sky High Stuntman is a 1991 action video game developed and published by Codemasters for personal computers. The game is a shoot em up in top-down perspective, where players command a series of planes and shoot down enemies as a stuntman. Codemasters announced the game in September 1991, and was marketed as a budget title. Upon release, the game received mixed reviews, with critics considering the game was broadly similar to other titles in the genre and insufficiently linked to its stuntman theme. The game was re-released by the publisher in several compilations, including Smash 16, and Quattro Mega Stars, alongside CJ's Elephant Antics, Bigfoot, and Little Puff in Dragonland.

== Gameplay ==
Atari ST version screenshot of gameplay

As a stuntman performing shoots for "Steven Squealburgh", players complete a series of levels across four stages shooting down enemies in a plane, balloon, Phantom fighter jet and helicopter. Players control their craft from a top down perspective, using the arrow keys to navigate and a secondary button to fire their weapon. Players collect power-ups throughout levels to increase their firepower, which is reverted when they lose a life.

== Reception ==
Reception

Review scores
Publication	Score		
Publication	Amiga	C64	ZX
Amiga Power	84%		
Crash			51%
Your Sinclair			80%
Zzap!64		63% / 71%	
Commodore Power		3/5	

Sky High Stuntman received mixed reviews upon release, with many considering the game to be unoriginal and repetitive, and Amiga Power remarking the game bore a strong resemblance to the game SWIV. Commodore Power found the game "playable", but described it as a "bog-standard" shooter disguised as a stunt game. Similarly, considering the game to be "ordinary" in every way, Zzap!64 stated the game was "little more than an ordinary, everyday shoot em up with the stuntman theme adding nothing to the gameplay whatsoever". Your Sinclair enjoyed the game's film theme and gameplay, but found the game "gets a bit dull" as "each level's pretty similar" and featured repetitive enemies.
