= Slightly Magic =

1991 video game

- Developers: Astonishing Animations; Potassium Frog
- Publishers: Codemasters; Potassium Frog
- Designer: Colin Jones
- Artists: Chris Graham; Colin Jones; Keith Ross
- Writer: Colin Jones
- Composer: Allister Brimble
- Platforms: Amiga, Amstrad CPC, Atari ST, Commodore 64, ZX Spectrum; Remaster; Android, iOS, Linux, Macintosh, Windows
- Release: 1991
- Genre: Action-adventure
- Mode: Single-player

Slightly Magic is an action-adventure game published in 1991 by Codemasters for the Amiga, Amstrad CPC, Atari ST, Commodore 64 and ZX Spectrum. It was written by Colin Jones, author of Rock Star Ate My Hamster (also by Codemasters).

== Plot ==
Bigwiz the wizard has left the castle in a hurry and has been a bit forgetful. He forgot to pack his spare wand, he forgot to lock his laboratory door and forgot to take his nephew Slightly with him. To make matters worse, a sunburnt dragon has run off with the Princess Croak and the spell cabinet has been knocked over spreading the spells everywhere.

== Gameplay ==
The gameplay in Slightly Magic is closely related to the gameplay of Dizzy. As with Dizzy, the player starts off with no equipment and has to explore the area to find items and solve puzzles, but Slightly Magic expands this idea by allowing the use of spells to solve puzzles. The player must collect the ingredients and the correct spell word to cast a spell, which would allow the player to solve a puzzle (for example, a fish spell to turn into a fish and swim in water).

== Reception ==
Slightly Magic received 94% in Your Sinclair magazine with the reviewer praising the graphics and music and claiming it was a better game than Dizzy. CRASH awarded it 78%, although they criticized some of the animation. Sinclair User gave the game 89% claiming it was worth at least three times its £2.99 retail price. Slightly Magic also claimed position 56 in the Your Sinclair "top 100 Spectrum games" as voted by readers.

When Commodore Format reviewed the game in their November 1991 issue, it was given a low score by their budget games reviewer, who said the game had sluggish controls and the screen flicked on and off many times when trying to use items and talk to people. He also said bringing up the inventory took a series of fire button presses.

== Legacy ==
In September 2016 an updated version of the game was launched on Steam.
