= Sword of Honour (video game) =

1992 video game

- Developer: Dynafield Systems
- Publisher: Electric Boys Entertainment
- Platforms: Amiga, Commodore 64, MS-DOS
- Release: 1992
- Genre: Action-adventure

Sword of Honour is an action-adventure video game developed by Dynafield Systems. It was published in 1992 by Electric Boys Entertainment for the Amiga, Commodore 64, and MS-DOS. The game took almost three years to develop.

== Gameplay ==
Sword of Honour combines the action-adventure oriented gameplay of the 1987 game The Last Ninja with the side-scrolling perspective of the 1986 games Ninja (aka Ninja Mission) and Fist II: The Legend Continues, and the icon-based controls of the 1987 game Barbarian. The player fights enemies (either in unarmed combat or with the aid of ninjatō, kusarigama, tekagi-shuko, shuriken, and kunai), avoids traps, collects and uses items, and interacts with characters.

== Plot ==
The player takes a role of an elite ninja sent for a mission to recover the stolen family sword of the fictional Shogun Yuichiro from a castle of his enemy, the evil Lord Toranaga. The ninja must retrieve the sword and punish Toranaga before Yuichiro will be forced to commit seppuku.

== Reception ==
The game received mixed reviews and scores, from 86% in CU Amiga (calling it "an excellent combat title, but there is so much more in there that you would be a complete fool to miss it"), to 77% in The One and 67% in Amiga Format, to only 23% in Amiga Power (which said the game "sets a low standard, and still fails to reach it").
