= Pinkie (video game) =

1994 video game

- Developer: Data Design Interactive
- Publishers: EU: Millennium Interactive; WW: Piko Interactive (SNES)
- Producers: Stewart Green; Tony Hackett
- Designers: Scott Williams; Stewart Green
- Programmer: Scott Williams
- Artists: John Court; Mark Rafter
- Writers: Scott Williams; Stewart Green
- Composer: Darren Wood
- Platforms: Amiga, Super Nintendo Entertainment System
- Release: EU: September 1994; WW: 2017 (SNES)
- Genre: Platform
- Mode: Single-player

Pinkie is a 1994 platform video game developed by Data Design Interactive and originally published by Millennium Interactive for the Amiga. A Super Nintendo Entertainment System version was released by Piko Interactive in 2017. In the game, the player takes on the role of Pinkie, who is tasked with collecting eggs throughout the galaxy to prevent the extinction of the Pinkie dinosaur race. The player controls Pinkie and his "Pinkie Pod" vehicle across 50 levels featuring a variety of enemies and obstacles divided into five planets. The Pinkie Pod can perform various actions, and the player can obtain upgrades to augment its features.

Pinkie began production in January 1993 on the Amiga platform when co-designers Stewart Green and Scott Williams discussed what they liked in games, settling to make a game that was as playable as Mario but with puzzles. The game was developed primarily on the Amiga, although it was being made simultaneously for other systems, which led the team to design the game to be console-orientated. The music was scored by Darren Wood and the record label Station 2 Station. Versions for Amiga CD32, Game Gear, and Sega Mega Drive were planned but never released. The game garnered average reviews from the video game press.

== Gameplay ==
Pinkie using his Pinkie Pod vehicle to reach an egg on a platform

Pinkie is a side-scrolling platform game with puzzle elements. The player takes on the role of Pinkie from the Pinkie dinosaur race on planet Purple, who is tasked by his King with collecting eggs throughout the galaxy to prevent their extinction. The player controls Pinkie and his "Pinkie Pod" vehicle across 50 levels, which feature a variety of enemies and obstacles, divided into five planets, each one represented by an overworld map that expands after completing a level. Each level is completed once Pinkie collects two out of three eggs, which are placed in pre-determined locations.

Pinkie can jump on enemies to temporarily stun them while outside the pod vehicle, but can only take one hit before losing a life. When using the Pinkie Pod, the player is invulnerable and can perform various actions, such as ascend to reach higher platforms, attack enemies, dive underwater, and store collected eggs. Between levels, the player can obtain upgrades to enhance the Pinkie Pod's features. After completing each level on a planet, a boss must be fought in order to advance.

== Development ==
Pinkie was created by Data Design Interactive, a British game developer that had previously worked for publisher Millennium Interactive on the Commodore 64 and Game Boy versions of James Pond 2 and the level design for James Pond 3. It was co-produced by Stewart Green and Tony Hackett. Green also served as game designer, scenario writer, and character designer alongside Scott Williams, who worked as designer and programmer on Krusty's Super Fun House (1992). Williams conceived the game's concept and acted as programmer, with Antonio Argentieri and Simon Prytherch providing additional routines. Lead artist John Court was responsible for the graphic design, while Mark Rafter was in charge of storyboarding the game's introductory sequence. The soundtrack was scored by Darren Wood and the record label Station 2 Station.

Production began in January 1993, when Green and Williams discussed their tastes in video games and decided to create a game with the same playable quality as Mario, but with puzzles and a different graphic style. They also conceived the character of Pinkie, whose appearance was gradually modified as the game's concept evolved during development over the course of six months until it was finalized. The character was colored pink and given large eyes to make him appear vulnerable and cute. The team also devised the concept of "opposites", which resulted in Pinkie's capsule, the Pinkie Pod. The original idea was an armoured vehicle, but the team settled on a gadget-equipped vehicle, as they were looking for something more exciting and feature-rich. However, they got carried away with their ideas for the vehicle and decided to limit the player's number of moves when designing levels and implementing puzzles.

Pinkie was primarily developed for the Amiga, a platform that Data Design Interactive considered accessible and easy to program for, although it was also being developed simultaneously for other systems. The cross-platform development led the team to design the game with a more console-oriented approach. The team initially placed more details in the backgrounds but when showcasing the game, the public preferred simple pastel backgrounds. By de-emphasising complex backgrounds and parallax effects, it allowed the team to display 32 colors onscreen instead of 16 colors, although Green admitted the game could have been faster. For the alien level, the background was animated using a method where the onscreen block grids are constantly updating. All the game's visuals were designed to be compressed, as the team were accustomed to compression routines due to their previous experience with the Commodore 64 version of James Pond 2. Millennium tested the game in its early stages with a focus group of children, who preferred its adorable appearance and puzzle elements to the platforming mechanics and level exploration. The record label Station 2 Station approached Millennium, asking for characters with audio potential, and Millennium showed them screenshots, artwork, and Pinkie's profile to produce a marketable single in a month. Millennium also agreed that Station 2 Station would compose the in-game music as well.

== Release ==
Pinkie was initially planned to be published by Millennium Interactive for Amiga on Easter 1994, but it was slated for March and later for June. it was released on September (although October is also listed as its release date). An Amiga CD32 version was announced but never released despite being reviewed by British publication Amiga CD32 Gamer. Game Gear and Sega Mega Drive versions were also under development by Millennium and planned to be published by Tengen. Both versions were first scheduled for August 1994 and later for September, while the Mega Drive version was planned for November, but neither version materialized. A Super Nintendo Entertainment System (SNES) version was going to be published by Seika Corporation in North America and by Sony Electronic Publishing in Australia, but it never released until a prototype ROM image was leaked online in 2014. In 2015, Piko Interactive acquired the rights of the unreleased SNES version and opened up pre-orders in 2017.

== Reception ==
Reception

Review scores
Publication	Score
Amiga Action	84%
Amiga Computing	83%
Amiga Power	20%
Computer and Video Games	80/100
Génération 4	70%
Amiga Concept	81%
Amiga Dream	81%
Amiga Games	53%
Amiga Joker	70%
CU Amiga	79%
Games World	61/100
The One Amiga	81%
Play Time	54%, 55%
Secret Service	230/300
Score	1/10

Pinkie garnered average reviews from the video game press. CU Amiga's Tony Dillon regarded it as a fun and original game, praising the graphical presentation and techno soundtrack but found its overall appeal too limited, commenting that younger players will get bored with the game while older players might find it slow to be enjoyable. The One Amiga's Matt Broughton commended the game's graphics, humorous character animations, varied levels, and the Pinkie Pod for being a major "toy-fest", but noted similarities with the James Pond series and criticized its shallow gameplay. Amiga Concept's Séverine Ducly and Fabinnou found the game friendly and fun, and highlighted Pinkie's character, but both reviewers concurred with Broughton regarding similarities with James Pond. They also felt the game's controls were occasionally tricky and saw the "cute" visuals far from exceptional.

Amiga Computing's Jonathan Maddock echoed similar thoughts when comparing Pinkie to the James Pond series, notably its blend of platform action and puzzles. Maddock labelled the game as a "cracking little platformer", praising its pastel-colored graphics, well-presented character animations, pop soundtrack, adequate sound effects, and large bosses. Amiga Dream's Grégory Halliday agreed with Maddock about the pastel-toned visuals, stating that they give charm to the presentation but noted the occasionally bare backgrounds. Halliday also felt the game took characteristics from the James Pond series, specifically James Pond 3. Amiga Joker's Richard Löwenstein gave the game positive remarks to its music, suitable sound effects, and control system, but faulted the constant disk swapping, jerky scrolling, little detailed graphics, and poor sprite animations. Computer and Video Games deemed it as an enjoyable platform/puzzle game for kids, commending its colorful hand-drawn environments, audio, and playability.

French magazine Génération 4 gave Pinkie positive remarks for its graphics, animated backgrounds, length, difficulty, and Pinkie's maneuverability, but felt it did not bring any innovation. Amiga Games' Michael Erlwein commended the game's cute and colorful visuals, but criticized its lack of innovation, animations, lukewarm presentation, and monotonous level design. Writing for German magazine Play Time, Oliver Menne expressed that the title was a "run-of-the-mill platformer" reminiscent of other games while Ingolf Held shared Erlwein's opinion regarding its lack of innovation. In contrast to most critics, Amiga Power's Jonathan Nash lambasted various aspects of the game such as the empty levels and collision detection, calling it "wretchedly unsalvageable platform nonsense". Polish publication Secret Service disagreed with Nash's sentiment, opining that it is a good game but found the visuals unimpressive.
