= Rings of Medusa =

1989 video game

- Developer: Starbyte Software
- Publishers: Starbyte Software; General Admission Software (R.O.M. Gold)
- Designer: Tilmann Bubeck
- Programmer: Tilmann Bubeck
- Artist: Thorsten Zimmermann
- Composer: Jochen Hippel
- Series: Rings of Medusa
- Platforms: Amiga, Atari ST, Commodore 64, MS-DOS
- Release: 1989, 1994 (Gold)
- Genres: Real-time strategy, RPG
- Mode: Single-player

Rings of Medusa is a fantasy-themed video game developed and published by Starbyte Software for the Amiga, Atari ST, Commodore 64, and MS-DOS in 1989. The game is a hybrid of role-playing, strategy, and trading genres. It received mixed reviews.

The game was followed by a sequel, The Return of Medusa in 1991, and an enhanced remake, R.O.M. Gold: Rings of Medusa, in 1994.

== Gameplay ==
The game centers around the quest of Prince Cirion of Morenor attempting to save the kingdom from an evil spell of the demonworld queen Medusa who has split his country and forced him into exile. Cirion must find five magic rings, scattered around the country, to summon the witch for a final showdown.

The rings can be found by conquering cities, digging for treasure and a sea fight. The player must gain enough money to finance a strong army. To achieve this, the protagonist Cirion trades in goods between towns, where he is subject to bandit attacks (scouts increase view range to enable avoiding them). On the map the player may also dig for treasures, conquer cities and install troops to defend that town, and later cross the large ocean and visit other islands.

Within the game, the player controls directly only the squadron that Cirion is with, whereas the other troops use a defense plan chosen previously. When the player visits a city, a control screen appears, with options to sell and buy wares, gamble in the casino, gather information on temples and recruit troops.

== Reception ==
Rings of Medusa received mixed reviews, including the same highly positive score of 85% in both Amiga Computing and ACE. Other ratings included 80% from Power Play, 71% from Zzap!64, 51/60 from ASM, and 44% from The Games Machine. Computer Gaming World approved of the game's graphics, but criticized the interface and gameplay as clumsy, needlessly difficult, and unrealistic.

== Legacy ==
In the sequel, The Return of Medusa, it is revealed that the vanquishing of Medusa is not done as she has just escaped 300 years into the future, so Cirion follows her there to defeat once for all. It is a first-person-point-of-view role-playing game.

A remake titled R.O.M. Gold: Rings of Medusa was developed by Starbyte Software and published by General Admission Software for the Amiga and PC DOS in 1994. In comparison with the original version, the game features enhanced graphics and sound, as well as an improved interface. R.O.M. Gold received generally positive scores, including 79% from both Amiga Games and Amiga Joker, and 71% from Power Play.

Another remake was announced by the original game's creator and artist Torsten Zimmermann.
