= The Return of Medusa =

1991 video game

- Developer: X-Ample
- Publisher: Starbyte Software
- Programmer: Till Bubeck
- Artist: Torsten Zimmermann
- Composer: Jochen Hippel
- Series: Rings of Medusa
- Platforms: Amiga, Atari ST, MS-DOS
- Release: 1991
- Genres: Role-playing, strategy
- Mode: Single-player

The Return of Medusa, also known as The Return of Medusa: Rings of Medusa II, is a 1991 role-playing video game and strategy video game hybrid developed by X-Ample and published by Starbyte Software for Amiga, Atari ST, and MS-DOS as a sequel to the 1989 game Rings of Medusa. A planned Commodore 64 version was cancelled.

== Gameplay ==
Unlike the original, the game is a first-person dungeon crawl, similar to Dungeon Master. Once the player has escaped the dungeon the game becomes a strategy style, involving visiting various locations where trading can be done in order to finance armies. Alternative ways to accumulate income include attacking enemy gangs, playing roulette at the casino and robbing banks.

== Plot ==
It has been many years since the young Cirion, Crown Prince of Morenor, won what he thought to be the final battle against the wicked queen Medusa and conquered her hellish army, but before the Cirion's coronation, he is confronted by the returning Medusa, who kidnaps his girlfriend and boastfully declares her intent to travel to the far future, where he would be long dead and there would be no-one to stop her from gaining absolute control over his land. In the last moment, Cirion follows Medusa through the portal, emerging 300 years into the future in a modern era.

Cirion is now again alone in the fight against the overwhelming forces of evil. Hie must find thirteen keys to Medusa's lair hidden in the mazes of underground bunkers, and destroy the dark crystal Dohor that is the source of the witch's power to defeat her forever and rescue his beloved.

== Reception ==
The game received generally positive reviews, including the scores of 85% from Amiga Format, 69% from Amiga Action, 90% from Joystick, 82% from Amiga Joker, 70% from Power Play, and 42/50 from ASM.
