= Shadow Fighter (video game) =

1994 video game

- Developer: NAPS team
- Publisher: Gremlin Interactive
- Composer: Patrick Phelan
- Platforms: Amiga, CD32
- Release: 1994
- Genre: Fighting
- Modes: Single-player, multiplayer

Shadow Fighter is a video game for the Amiga and CD32 developed by NAPS team and published by Gremlin Interactive in 1994. The game was acclaimed by critics, and in 1996 it was ranked the 20th best game of all time by Amiga Power.

== Gameplay ==
The game itself is as one would normally expect from any fighting game: fight through 3 rounds against all opponents to reach the main boss at the end. The game features 17 characters (2 hidden) from around the world (including one from space).

Each character of course has their own special moves. Like most fighting games, they involve pressing a certain directional combination, followed by a button press to activate. Some of the moves are quite tricky to pull off using a joystick or keyboard, though much easier with a joypad (which started to become more popular on the Amiga towards the mid-1990s).

For those still finding the moves too difficult to perform, the player can practice their moves on a training dummy called Pupazz. However, Pupazz is kitted out with his own set of moves, which make him lethal in his own right. Pupazz can only be accessed as a playable character via a cheat.

During the in-game action, players are notified of bonuses for performing certain actions (such as first attacks and combos), in a very similar way to Super Street Fighter II.

To rival the bloody violence of Mortal Kombat, a "blood mode" is included in the game, which can be toggled on or off, but this appears to do nothing other than turn the floor an untextured red colour.

The main character of the game is Shadow Fighter himself. The player can only fight Shadow Fighter if they are playing the game under Normal or Hard difficulty settings, as the game will end just before Shadow Fighter is reached under Easy. Shadow Fighter can be accessed as a playable fighter by using a cheat.

The game ran at a constant 25 frames per second; with the use of a cheat the game could be made to run at 50fps on AGA Amigas.

== Reception ==
The game was ranked the 20th best game of all time by Amiga Power.
