= Starglider =

1986 video game

- Developer: Argonaut Software
- Publisher: Rainbird
- Designers: Jez San; Rick Clucas
- Platforms: Amiga, Atari ST, Amstrad CPC, Amstrad PCW, Apple II, ZX Spectrum, MS-DOS, Commodore 64
- Release: 1986 (Atari ST); 1987 (ports)
- Genre: Space flight simulator
- Mode: Single-player

Starglider is a 3D video game published in 1986 by Rainbird. It was developed by Jez San under his company name Argonaut Software. The game is a fast-moving, first-person combat flight simulator, rendered with colourful wireframe vector graphics inspired by San's love of the 1983 Atari coin-op Star Wars.

Starglider was originally developed for the 16-bit Amiga and Atari ST. Rainbird commissioned Realtime Games to produce 8-bit versions for the Amstrad CPC, Amstrad PCW, and ZX Spectrum (128K, with a cut-down 48K version without sampled speech or special missions), and for the IBM PC compatible with CGA. Solid Image was commissioned to produce versions for the Commodore 64 and Apple IIGS.

It was followed in 1988 by a sequel, Starglider 2, which uses filled-polygon graphics. The series inspired Argonaut to partner with Nintendo in creating the Super FX chip for Super NES in order to power the Star Fox series of hit games.

== Story ==
The game takes place over the surface of the occupied planet Novenia, and it is the player's goal to rid the world of the mechanised Egron invaders.

Cockpit view. A walker robot is on-screen. Amiga version.

Starglider was packaged with a sci-fi novella by James Follett, describing the game's background story, in which the Egrons effortlessly blitz Novenia despite the planet possessing a previously impenetrable network of utterly deadly defense satellites. The Egrons defeat the system by disguising their battleships as a flock of intergalactic migratory birds, the Stargliders. The defense satellites had been programmed not to fire on these birds (which migrated between planets regularly) and hence did not recognise the Egron battleships as enemies, allowing the Egrons to reach the surface unopposed. The player pilots the only existing example of a prototype fighter craft, initially armed only with lasers, as the TV-guided missiles require an enormous amount of energy to launch and control, which can only be gained by induction as the craft skims over areas with high-tension power conduits.

== Audio ==
Most versions contain sampled speech from Rainbird employee Clare Edgeley.

The Amiga version has title music by Dave Lowe using digitized samples as instrument sounds, predating tracker music. The Atari ST and Amiga versions also have about 15-second long song—a single PCM sound file—with real vocals and synthesizers. A male voice sings: "Starglider ... from Rainbird".

== Reception ==
Reception

Awards
Publication	Award
Crash	Crash Smash
Sinclair User	SU Classic
Amstrad Action	Mastergame

Starglider was Firebird's third best-selling Commodore game as of late 1987. COMPUTE! called it "a visually smooth concoction that is so realistic in its feel that you'll duck and squirm in your seat", especially praising the Atari ST version's graphics and sound. The game won the award for Game Of The Year 1986 in Crash.

The game sold close to 200,000 copies.

== Legacy ==
A prototype version of Starglider, codenamed NESGlider, was developed for the Nintendo Entertainment System utilizing a similar method to accelerate graphics as the future Super FX chip for the SNES would. Argonaut showed the prototype to Nintendo in 1990 but were advised to instead develop the game for the as yet unreleased Super Famicom. They ported the demo to the Super Famicom prototype which took approximately one week.

The game was never released; nonetheless, it spawned a sequel, entitled Starglider 2. The series inspired Argonaut Software to partner with Nintendo in creating the Super FX enhancement chip for Super NES in order to enable the StarFox series.
