= Zyron =

Specialty gases registered by DuPont

Zyron is a registered trademark for specialty gases marketed to the global electronics industry by DuPont.

== History ==
Freon was used as the original brand name for electronic gases produced and marketed by DuPont. With the depletion of the ozone layer and the subsequent phase-out of chlorofluorocarbon (CFC) gas compounds, the company rebranded this product line to differentiate from refrigerant gases that had been using the same Freon brand name.

The name was developed in October 1991 by DuPont employees Paul Bechly and Dr. Nicholas Nazarenko, was first used in commerce on June 12, 1992, and became a registered trademark of DuPont in 1993.

== Naming System ==
The Zyron product naming system was also developed by Bechly and Nazarenko in October 1991. The system is based upon the historical industry numbering system for fluorinated alkanes to identify the chemical compound, followed by an (N) suffix component that specified product purity. The naming system was intentionally not trademarked to allow for industrial adoption.

As example for Zyron 116 N5: the 116 represents the compound hexafluoroethane, and N5 represents "5 nines" or 99.999% purity.

As example for Zyron 23 N3 the 23 represents the compound trifluoromethane, and N3 represents "3 nine" or 99.99% purity.

== Products ==
Zyron 116 N5 (hexafluoroethane)

Zyron 318 N4 (octafluorocyclobutane)

Zyron 23 N5 (trifluoromethane)

Zyron 23 N3 (trifluoromethane)

Historical products included: Zyron 14 (tetrafluoromethane), Zyron 32 (difluoromethane), Zyron 125 (pentafluoroethane), and Zyron NF3 (nitrogen trifluoride).

== Applications ==
The primary applications of these gases for the electronics industry are for etching of silicon wafer, and cleaning of chemical vapor deposition chamber tools. These are all plasma-based product applications where the product is essentially destroyed in use.

Alternative products to the Zyron line for various application in electronics include the chemical compounds HCl, BCl_{3}, CF_{4}, ClF_{3}, CH_{2}F_{2}, Ge_{H}4, C_{4}F_{6}, NF_{3}, C_{5}F_{8}, PH_{3}, C_{3}H_{6}, SiH_{4}, and WF_{6}.

== In the news ==
- Zyron expansion announcement (1999)
- Zyron 2nd expansion announcement (2001)
- "Zyron NF3 announcement". 2002.
- Zyron team award announcement (2007)
- Semicon Taiwan announcement (2010)

== See also ==
- Semiconductor device fabrication
- Fluorocarbons
- Perfluorinated compound
- Greenhouse gas
- Global warming
