= Projectyle =

1990 video game

- Developer(s): Eldritch the Cat
- Publisher(s): Electronic Arts
- Composer(s): Steve Wetherill
- Platform(s): Amiga, Atari ST
- Release: EU: 1990
- Genre(s): Sports, Action
- Mode(s): Single-player, multiplayer

Projectyle is a sports video game originally released in 1990 for the Amiga and Atari ST.

== Gameplay ==
The game is based around a futuristic take on air hockey, albeit one where three participants compete and attempt to score points rather than two.

== Development ==
The game was developed by British developer Eldritch the Cat, and published by Electronic Arts.

== Reception ==
Alan Emrich and Chris Lombardi reviewed the game for Computer Gaming World, and stated that "Projectyle would be just another "Rollerball" rip-off if it weren't for the flavor that is added in terms of individual players with ratings in 6 statistics, unique home fields with personalities of their own, and special effects objects that add twists to the game play."

== See also ==
- Shufflepuck Café
