= Shadow of the Devil =

1996 video game

- Developer: Riki Computer games
- Publisher: Riki Computer games
- Producer: Richard Pintér
- Designers: Martin Blažíček, Marek Forray
- Programmer: Milan Blažíček
- Artists: Milan Blažíček, Marek Forray
- Composers: Rastislav Škultéty (intro theme), Milan Blažíček (in-game music)
- Platform: Amiga
- Release: 1996
- Genre: Point-and-click adventure
- Mode: Single-player

Shadow of the Devil is a 1996 Slovak Point-and-click adventure released on the Amiga.

The game was originally announced as "Dark Seed Killer" in 1994. It was developed by Slovak team Bytepack and published by the Slovak publisher Riki, which also owned the video game reviewing magazine of the same name. Screenshots and demos were created by Marek Forray. The game was released as Shadow of the Devils in late 1996 " after many struggles". According to a 2016 retrospective by Riki, "there was some personal conflict between the authors and the publisher that lead to this disappointing release". The game's skoopy house set pieces were designed by Milan Blažíček, while Marek Forray created the second half hell-like environments. The game features one tune repeated.

== Plot and gameplay ==
It is the last day of 1999, and the player visits their aunt's house. In a diary the player reads that the devil will take over the world the following day. The player must save the world from within the house.

The game lacks a save feature, despite it being very easy to die. The game's language is only in Slovak.

== Critical reception ==
Riki wrote that upon release, the game was "unfinished, unpolished, and very basic". Riki wrote in a 2016 retrospective, "it is hard to believe that someone actually really released this game for Amiga in this state and honestly believed it would be a success in 1996". Amiga Review felt it was a game with interesting ideas that weren't properly executed.
