= Wizard Willy =

1989 video game

- Publisher: Codemasters
- Designer: Dave Semmens
- Platforms: Amstrad CPC, Amiga, Commodore 64, ZX Spectrum, Atari ST
- Release: Amstrad CPC: UK: 1989; Amiga, Commodore 64, ZX Spectrum: UK: 1990; Atari ST: UK: 1991; Italy: 1991
- Genre: Action
- Mode: Single-player

Wizard Willy is a 1989 video game developed and published by Codemasters for the Amstrad CPC. The game was later released by Codemasters as Spellfire the Sorcerer on Amiga, Commodore 64 and ZX Spectrum in 1990 and Atari ST in 1991. It was part of Cartoon Time, a series of games marketed at younger players. Upon release, the game received generally positive reviews, although later ports were criticised for their graphics. The game was re-released in 1991 as a Quattro Cartoon compilation alongside Little Puff, Frankenstein Junior and Olli & Lisa 3.

== Gameplay ==
Gameplay in the Amstrad CPC version of Wizard Willy.

Playing as the titular wizard, players must rescue Fifi the Fairy from the Emperor's fortress. Players progress through a series of horizontally scrolling levels, jumping across platforms, and avoiding traps and enemies, the latter of which Willy can defeat by projecting spells. Players start with a basic spell, shooting lightning bolts, but can collect magic runes throughout the levels that allow them to case more powerful spells. Use of spells is limited, and the player's use of lightning bolts depletes, but can be replenished through collecting power-ups. To complete the level, players must collect ten magic eyes within the level, and defeat the boss.

== Reception ==
Reception

Review scores
| Publication | Score | | |
| Publication | CPC | C64 | ZX |
|---|---|---|---|
| Amstrad Action | 77% | | |
| Your Sinclair | | | 68% |
| Crash | | | 42% |
| Your Commodore | | 75% | |
| Zzap64 | | | 53% |

Reviews of the Amstrad CPC version of Wizard Willy were generally positive. Amstrad Action praised the "exceedingly well-drawn" sprites, use of parallax scrolling and "atmospheric" backgrounds as fitting in well with the game, although critiqued its lack of sound during gameplay. Later reviewing the game for Quattro, the magazine similarly stated the game was a "little gem" that "plays brilliantly", highlighting the game's characters, "superb" graphics and attention to detail. New Computer Express described the game's graphics and soundtrack as "excellent" and the game as "superbly playable" and with "real replayability" overall.

Reviewers of other ports were mixed, with Your Commodore noting that the graphics of the game on the Commodore 64 were inferior to the Amstrad CPC release. Similarly, Crash considered the Spectrum version of the game to be a "dire" let-down, critiquing the monochrome graphics and sprites that "all look like they've been badly cut out of a newspaper and stuck on the screen". Your Sinclair felt the game's graphics were "hard to make out" and "indistinct". Although remarking the game was "fun" and "fast paced", Zzap!64 found the game to be "over a bit too quickly" and "[wasn't] very innovative".
