= Rainbow Warrior (video game) =

1989 video game

- Developer(s): Source the Software House
- Publisher(s): MicroStyle
- Platform(s): Atari ST, Commodore 64, Amiga
- Release: 1989

Rainbow Warrior is a video game for home computers produced by Greenpeace, developed in association with Source the Software House and published by MicroStyle in 1989. Versions were released for the Commodore 64, Amiga and Atari ST. The game is a collection of mini-games which relate to Greenpeace's environmental campaigns and actions during the 1980s. A printed booklet containing further information about the environmental campaigns accompanied the game. It was manufactured in the United Kingdom and claimed to be "the first environment friendly software". The game was officially launched aboard the Rainbow Warrior II with Doug Faulkner and Jonathan Smales representing Greenpeace.

== Development ==
The game was designed by Tony Gibson and Mark Harrison based on an original concept by Stevie Harrison. The music was composed by Paul Summers. The Atari ST version was programmed by Dave Semmens, Adrian Scothey and Ian Richards, with graphics by John Cassells, Tony Fawcett, Mark Scott and Bryn Redman.
