= Zoom! =

1988 video game

- Developers: Discovery Software; Sigma Pro-Tech (Genesis)
- Publishers: Discovery Software; Sega (Genesis)
- Platforms: Amiga, Commodore 64, MS-DOS, Genesis
- Release: 1988; Genesis: NA: January 1990; JP: January 13, 1990; EU: 1990
- Genre: Puzzle
- Modes: Single-player, multiplayer

Zoom! is a puzzle video game by developed and published by Discovery Software. Amiga, Commodore 64, and MS-DOS versions were released in 1988, followed-by a port by Sega for the Genesis in 1990. The game has a 3D-like board the player moves around on. Up to two players may play simultaneously.

== Plot ==
Earth has been captured by Space Phantoms using magical forcefields. The only hope for Earth's survival is Mr. Smart, a big-eared creature. Mr. Smart must travel from shield to shield while out-running the Space Phantoms in order to save the world.

== Gameplay ==
In this game, the player controls the character, Mr. Smart. The player navigates around a total of 36 faux 3D style game boards, skating through the gridlines of each tile on the board. Doing so causing the gridlines to change colors. Once a grid tile is completely surrounded by colored lines, it flashes. The game board is completed when the player has successfully skated on every line of the grid.

The player must avoid various enemies on each game board including Space Phantoms, Rowdy Fingers, and Spilers, the latter of which removes colored lines the player had previously skated upon. Coming into contact with the enemies can cause the player to lose a life or otherwise be hindered, such as slowing the character's skating speed. Completing the level defeats all enemies on the game board. However, the player can also use a limited amount of rubber balls to defeat enemies as well.

The player can also collect power ups in the game, including Ribbon Candy, which add additional game points, Bananas that slow certain game enemies, and an Hour Glass that freezes all enemies for a brief period as well as a Sun that provides the player with temporary invincibility.

== Reception ==
The Sega Genesis port of Zoom! received a mostly negative response from gamers and critics upon its release. Electronic Gaming Monthly gave the game an average of 3/10 with reviewers stating that the game looked 16-Bit, but delivered gameplay style similar to an Atari 2600 title. Commonly stated among reviewers were bad controls, repetitive sounds, and poor visual appeal. One reviewer stated that the game is "Easily the worst game to yet appear (on the Sega Genesis) and not worthy of the system."

Reception

Review score
| Publication | Score |
|---|---|
| MegaTech | 45% |
