= Puzznic =

1989 video game

- Home computer cover art
- Developer: Taito: Taito Animation 20 (JP Arcade, Towns) ZX Games (Windows) Software Creations (Amiga)
- Publisher: Taito: Taito Ocean Software Altron IGS Ving Games
- Platforms: Arcade, Amiga, Amstrad CPC, Apple IIGS, Atari ST, Commodore 64, Game Boy, PC-98, NES, PC Engine, ZX Spectrum, PlayStation, X68000, FM Towns
- Release: October 1989: Arcade; JP: October 1989; WW: Late 1989 Amiga, C64, CPC, MSX, ST, Spectrum; EU: 1990 FM Towns; JP: 1990 Game Boy; JP: 1990 PC-98; JP: 1990 PC Engine; JP: 1990 X68000; JP: 1990 NES; NA: November 1990; PAL: April 25, 1991; JP: July 19, 1991 MS-DOS; NA: 1990 PlayStation; JP: March 22, 2001; EU: February 27, 2003; NA: May 12, 2003
- Genre: Puzzle
- Mode: Single-player
- Arcade system: Taito L System

Puzznic (パズニック, Pazunikku) is a tile-matching video game developed and released by Taito for arcades in 1989. It was converted to the Nintendo Entertainment System, Game Boy, PC Engine, X68000, Amiga, Atari ST, Amstrad CPC, Commodore 64, MS-DOS, and ZX Spectrum between 1990 and 1991. Home computer ports were handled by Ocean Software; the 2003 PlayStation port was handled by Altron. The arcade and FM Towns versions have adult content, showing a naked woman at the end of the level; this was removed in the international arcade release (but not the US one) and other home ports. The completed Apple IIGS port was never officially released, but subsequently leaked, after Taito America shut down.

Puzznic bears strong graphical and some gameplay similarities to Taito's own Flipull/Plotting.

== Gameplay ==
Puzznic is a game which challenges players to clear blocks by matching identical patterns in straight lines. What starts out simple becomes increasingly complex as block movement is hindered by solid barriers and shifting platforms. Players can choose from multiple puzzle paths after the initial levels, ensuring that getting stuck does not halt progress altogether.

== Reception ==
Reception

Review score
Publication	Score
The One	88%

In Japan, Game Machine listed Puzznic on their December 1, 1989 issue as being the fourth-most-successful table arcade unit of the month.

The game was ranked the 34th best game of all time by Amiga Power.
