= Starfighter (video game) =

1979 video game

- Publisher(s): Aardvark
- Platform(s): Ohio Scientific, TRS-80, TRS-80 Color Computer
- Release: 1979: OSI; 1981: TRS-80

Starfighter is a video game published by Aardvark Technical Services in 1979 for Ohio Scientific computers. Three versions of the game were sold so they could work on a range of OSI hardware: Starfighter 540, Starfighter 600, and Starfighter Alphabetics. It was ported to the TRS-80 and TRS-80 Color Computer.

== Plot ==
Starfighter is a game in which the player commands a starfighter, using photon torpedoes and missiles against enemy starfighters, battleships, cruisers, and supercruisers in the Alpha Centauri system.

== Reception ==
Bruce Campbell reviewed Starfighter in The Space Gamer No. 61. Campbell commented that "While I have enjoyed playing Starfighter, I refuse to recommend a program that so badly needed additional debugging."
