= Greve Graphics =

Defunct Swedish video game developer

- Founded: 1984
- Founder: Bengt Caroli, Nils Hård

Greve Graphics was the first video game developer in Sweden and Scandinavia. The company was founded in 1984, by Nils Hård (graphics) and Bengt Caroli (programmer). Lars Hård (music) was asked to join. The publisher was American Action.

== Releases ==
Greve Graphics developed and released the following games:

- 1985 – Soldier One , a wargame consisting of seven minigames. The game was marketed hard in Scandinavia; hundreds of thousands kids received an advertisement leaflet in their mailboxes. The game sold over 75.000 copies in Sweden.
- 1986 – The SuperCan / Captured, multiple names during development
- 1986 – Blood 'N Guts
- 1987 – 1943 – One Year After

Unreleased:

- 1987 – Goremium

Four of the company's games were re-released in a collection 1987 called 4 Action Hits.

Greve Graphics also released a development kit called The Basic Revenge.
