= Sonic Boom (1987 video game) =

1987 video game

- Arcade flyer
- Developers: Sega; Source Software (EU)
- Publishers: JP: Sega; NA/EU: Activision
- Composer: Katsuhiro Hayashi
- Platforms: Arcade, Amiga, Amstrad CPC, Atari ST, Commodore 64, ZX Spectrum
- Release: Arcade: JP: December 1987; Amiga: NA: 1990; Amstrad CPC: EU: 1990; Atari ST: EU: 1990; Commodore 64: EU: 1990; ZX Spectrum: EU: 1990
- Genre: Scrolling shooter
- Mode: up to 2 players
- Arcade system: Sega System 16

Sonic Boom (ソニック・ブーム, Sonikku Būmu) is a vertical scrolling shooter developed by Sega and released in the arcades in 1987. Home computer versions for the Amiga, Atari ST, Amstrad CPC, Commodore 64 and ZX Spectrum were released in 1990 by Activision. The original arcade version was released on the Sega Astro City Mini console in 2021.

== Gameplay ==
The first stage.

As with most scrolling shooters, the player pilots an airplane fighter, armed with a single gun, which can be powered up by collecting power ups dropped by certain colored enemies. The power ups can add a ship to the fighter's left and right sides and increase shot power and range. They can also drop bombs, which can wipe out all weak enemies on screen and do massive damage to stronger enemies.

== Reception ==
Reception

Review scores
Publication	Score
Crash	59%
Computer and Video Games	53%
Sinclair User	60%
Your Sinclair	5/10

In Japan, Game Machine listed Sonic Boom on their February 1, 1988 issue as being the third most-successful table arcade unit of the month.

The home ports of Sonic Boom received mixed to negative reviews.

Crash had said that it plays very much like Flying Shark and "doesn't offer anything that hasn't already been seen".

The Games Machine' rated the Atari ST version 79%, the Amiga version 78%, the ZX Spectrum version 76%, the Amstrad CPC version 37% and the Commodore 64 version 64%.

Zzap!64 rated the Commodore 64 version 52% and the Amiga version 58%.

Amiga Action rated the Amiga version 49%.
