= Paragliding Simulation =

1991 video game

- Developer: Atreid Concept
- Publisher: Loriciels
- Platforms: Amiga, Atari ST, MS-DOS, Amstrad CPC
- Release: 1991
- Genre: Simulation
- Mode: 2 player alternating

Paragliding Simulation is a 1991 video game developed by Atreid Concept and published by Loriciels for the Amiga. The player attempts to paraglide across a map and land safely while avoiding obstacles.

== Reception ==
Reception

Review scores
Publication	Score
Aktueller Software Markt	17%
ST Format	59%

Paragliding Simulation received mixed to negative reviews from critics. ST Format noted the game was "unique" and the graphics were "better-animated and smoother" than its contemporaries, but critiqued the difficulty and found it less than enthralling. Play Time considered it to be a disappointment, citing the game's poor performance, subpar graphics and lack of instructions. Aktueller Software Markt critiqued the game's lack of gameplay and challenge in spite of its "technical details and pretty interludes".
