= Jez San =

British businessman (born 1966)

Jez San OBE
- Born: 29 March 1966 (age 60)
- Occupations: Game programmer; entrepreneur

Jeremy Elliott "Jez" San OBE (born 29 March 1966) is an English game programmer and entrepreneur who founded Argonaut Software as a teenager in the 1980s. He is best known for the 1986 Atari ST game Starglider and helping to design the Super FX chip used in Star Fox for the Super NES.

== Early career ==
San received his first computer, a TRS-80, at the age of twelve in 1978 from his father, who had a career in shipping the belongings of immigrants at the time. San became interested in video game development at a young age after playing a multi-user dungeon (MUD) in the 1970s. Within a year, he taught himself assembly language for several microprocessors.

San founded Argonaut Software as a teenager in high school at JFS to get software consulting jobs with large companies. He worked on security systems with British Telecom and Acorn. In 1984, he started developing his first game, Skyline Attack for the Commodore 64, and also co-wrote a book, Quantum Theory, about the Sinclair QL. He became a wizard (admin) at Essex MUD, the world's first multiplayer online role-playing game.

San's late-1986 game Starglider for the Atari ST and Amiga sold hundreds of thousands of copies (earning him £2 per copy in royalties). The money helped launch Argonaut, a larger company that hired others in 1986.

== Argonaut growth and decline ==
In the late 1980s, Argonaut signed a deal with Nintendo. San attracted Nintendo's attention because Argonaut was the first developer to successfully design 3D modelling on the NES and the Game Boy. Nintendo published X as the first 3D Game Boy game. San helped develop the first 3D graphics accelerator known as the Super FX chip, making Star Fox (released as Starwing in Europe) possible on the Super NES.

In 1996, Argonaut received external funding from Apax Partners and was listed publicly on the London Stock Exchange in 2000. San's stake was reduced from 90% in 1996 to almost 50% post Argonaut Games' initial public offering (IPO) in March 2000. San also helped found ARC International when it was spun out from Argonaut in 1998 and was its largest shareholder on the IPO. San made substantial share sales during the flotation by Goldman Sachs and Warburg, and in 2007, fully exited ARC. Between 1999 and 2002, San funded Codeplay and is currently the majority shareholder.

San received an OBE in 2002, the first explicitly awarded for services to the video game industry.

After announcing a substantial loss in August 2004, Argonaut Group PLC suspended trading of its shares in October and appointed administrators for Argonaut Software Ltd, Morpheme Ltd and Just Add Monsters Ltd—the wholly owned subsidiaries of the PLC. The administrators sold Morpheme and Just Add Monsters back to Jez San and the other founders as ongoing businesses, while Argonaut Software Ltd was eventually liquidated.

== Post-Argonaut ==
In November 2004, Just Add Monsters became Ninja Theory and continued the development of PlayStation 3 first-party game Heavenly Sword, which debuted three years later in September 2007. Also in 2004, Morpheme became Morpheme Wireless Ltd for a while before San left, and it was eventually acquired by Eidos/SCi before being shut down in 2009.

After taking a hiatus from the video game industry in 2004, San founded Crunchy Frog Ltd, which in 2005 became an online poker company, PKR. San served as president, having hired his replacement with CEO Malcolm Graham, formerly of the Ritz Casino and AntFactory. PKR was a 3D online poker site that operated in legal territories in Europe, Asia, and Canada but did not operate in the US, where online gambling was a grey area. In May 2017, PKR went into administration. San was only an investor at its collapse and expressed sorrow at seeing his creation fold.

In 2008, San co-founded mobile application developer and publisher Origin8 with game industry colleague Foo Katan. The company produces iPhone and BlackBerry software, and has offices in London.

San is a life member of BAFTA and was an advisory board member of the GDC and TIGA for several years.

In 2017 Sen created a startup called FunFair, a video game company that uses blockchain technology. He is a supporter of blockchain technologies.

San donated £1 million to the Conservative Party in the first quarter of 2025, followed by another £1 million in April 2025.
