= Star Command (1988 video game) =

1988 video game

- Developers: Winston Douglas Wood; Eric Liebenauer
- Publisher: Strategic Simulations
- Platforms: MS-DOS, Amiga, Atari ST, PC-98
- Release: 1988: MS-DOS; 1989: Amiga, ST, PC-88
- Genre: Role-playing
- Mode: Single-player

Star Command is a role-playing video game published by Strategic Simulations for MS-DOS in 1988. Versions for the Amiga, Atari ST, and PC-98 followed in 1989.

== Plot ==
Star Command is a game in which the player creates a crew of eight characters that complete missions from Star Command to earn credits and training for personnel. The crew can explore planets to obtain valuables, and can board disabled enemy ships to fight their crews and commandeer their ship.

== Reception ==
Reception

Review scores
Publication	Score
Computer Gaming World	2/5
Dragon	4.5/5

The game was reviewed in 1988 in Dragon #138 by Hartley, Patricia, and Kirk Lesser in "The Role of Computers" column. The reviewers gave the game 4 1/2 out of 5 stars. Jim Trunzo reviewed Star Command for White Wolf #14, rating it 5 overall. The reviewer praised the graphics as "well-done" and "functional", and the gameplay mechanics as "simple", and called the game "enjoyable" and "challenging" simulation.

Orson Scott Card was less favorable, writing in Compute! that Star Command "wants to be Starflight or Sentinel Worlds, but it isn't". He said that the "primitive graphics" were adequate, but "the problem is that there's no sense of experiencing anything. Mostly you're told about what's going on, and after a short time it seemed to me that it was a text game which consisted of" mechanical fetch quests. In a 1992 survey of science fiction games, Computer Gaming World gave the title two-plus stars of five, and a 1994 survey of strategic space games set in the year 2000 and later gave the game two stars.
