= Team Suzuki (video game) =

1991 video game

- European cover art
- Developer: Gremlin Graphics
- Publishers: EU: Gremlin Graphics; NA: Gremlin / Konami
- Platforms: Amiga, Atari ST, MS-DOS
- Release: 1991
- Genre: Racing simulator
- Mode: Single-player

Team Suzuki is a 1991 racing video game developed and published by Gremlin Graphics for the Amiga, Atari ST, and MS-DOS. A demo version of the game, titled Team Suzuki: Trainer Disk, was released in 1991. It includes only the practice mode.

== Gameplay ==
Team Suzuki is a game about simulating motorcycle racing. The game features three modes: practice, single race, and season. The objective of the season mode is to win the World Championship by driving a Suzuki motorcycle. A season consists of 16 races in 16 different tracks. Three classes are available to compete in: 125cc, 250cc, and 500cc. The game features damage modelling and the race is over if the bike sustains 100% damage.

== Reception ==
Reception

Review scores
Publication	Score
Aktueller Software Markt	8/12 (Amiga)
Computer and Video Games	95% (ST)
Games-X	3/5 (ST, Trainer Disk)
.info	4/5 (Amiga)
The One	90% (Amiga); 91% (ST)

Computer and Video Games said: "I was amazed to find it even outpaces Lotus Esprit Turbo Challenge for sheer speed and excitement." and concluded that "Essentially, this is the best, fastest, most exciting and challenging racer available, and an essential piece of software for anyone's collection!" Aktueller Software Markt summarized: "With Team Suzuki, Gremlin Graphics has created a really playable motorbike game that, despite everything, has its weaknesses." The One said the graphics on the Atari ST version are better than on the Amiga but the sound is worse. .info concluded by saying: "That's what makes Team Suzuki a good game: it keeps the racing at the forefront without encumbering it with a bunch of unnecessary frills. The frills are certainly there, but they stay sensibly in the back ground until you want them." Games-X reviewed the Trainer Disk saying that "[o]verall, I think this is a great idea. The only problem is with lastability as you will soon beat it!"
