= Rock Star Ate My Hamster =

1988 video game

- Developer: Colin Jones
- Publisher: Codemasters
- Designer: Chris Graham
- Composer: Allister Brimble (Atari ST)
- Platforms: ZX Spectrum, Commodore 64, Amstrad CPC, Amiga, Atari ST
- Release: EU: 1988
- Genres: Strategy, music management
- Mode: Single-player

Rock Star Ate My Hamster is a management strategy computer game developed by Codemasters in 1988 and originally released on their full-price Gold label for the Amstrad CPC, ZX Spectrum, Commodore 64, Amiga and Atari ST. The game was written by Colin Jones, later to become known as author/publisher Colin Bradshaw-Jones.

The name of the game was inspired by a 1986 Sun newspaper headline - 'Freddie Starr ate my hamster'.

== Synopsis ==
Desperate to get out of the circus theatrics business, Cecil Pitt and his sidekick, Clive, turn to the world of Rock music Management with the help of a £50,000 inheritance.

== Objective ==
To win the game, one must select a band, record an album and earn 4 gold discs within the space of a year. If the player fails to meet this target, goes bankrupt or has no musicians left, the game is over.

== Gameplay ==
The game is almost entirely menu-driven with options that allow the player to decide what the band does next.

The player's first task as manager is to pick musicians for the band, and then decide whether they should buy them brand-new equipment, second-hand equipment or get some dodgy gear off the back of a lorry.

ZX Spectrum screenshot

Once in the main game, the options presented are as follows:

- Practice - the players lock the band away for up to 5 days so they can practice. The music of the band is also presented, gradually increasing from atonal noise to actual music (songs are generated on the fly by the software).
- Gig - the players go on tour and is the primary source of moneymaking in the game.
- Publicity - the players organise a publicity stunt that can make the band more famous, but can also trigger events that kill a band member.
- Gifts - the players have to buy some gifts for the band to keep them sweet, otherwise they will make some rather costly ultimatums.
- Record - once the band gets a recording contract, this option appears and allows them to record an album.
- Release - once the album's recorded, this option releases it along with any singles.

Along the way, the player also has to decide:

- Whether or not to play a charity gig. Some of the charities that contact the band are real and others fake. The band could end up with negative publicity if they ignore a genuine charity or get duped by a bogus one.
- Whether or not to accept a sponsorship deal.
- To shoot a music video and who will direct it, the location and the theme of this project. The player has the options to select from a range of choices, each with a cost value, such as an expensive directors and locations or less costly ones. As with the parodical nature of the game director names lampoon real-life directors. A selection choice of a high level (most expensive) director is named Steven Cheeseburger (a parody of Steven Spielberg). There are many others fitting with the theme of recognizable but legally distinct names.
- Which recording contract is best for the player's band.
- What to do if a little organisation in Korea is bootlegging his or her records. Players have to decide if they should do nothing, sue them, buy them out or "send in the boys".

Releasing an album or single makes them eligible for the charts. A Top 10 Singles & Albums charts (depending on what players have released) gets displayed on screen every Sunday. The other bands in the Top 10 are also parodies of other rock bands.

== Controversy ==
The game is heavy on parody on existing people and names, which wasn't well-received across the board: according to Jones, "an irate parent had taken objection to one of the jokes in the spoof newspaper included in the box and WHSmith pulled the game from their shelves".

== Notes and references ==
All the information above was taken from either the actual gameplay, the game manual and/or packaging.
