= Super Foul Egg =

Video game

Super Foul Egg is a Puyo Puyo clone for the Amiga and the Acorn Archimedes. It was inspired by Amiga Power's comment that no decent clone of the game was made for the machine. After reading the comment, a reader created the game and sent it to the magazine, which included it on their cover disk. The game went on to be ranked the 34th best game of all time by Amiga Power.

== Gameplay ==
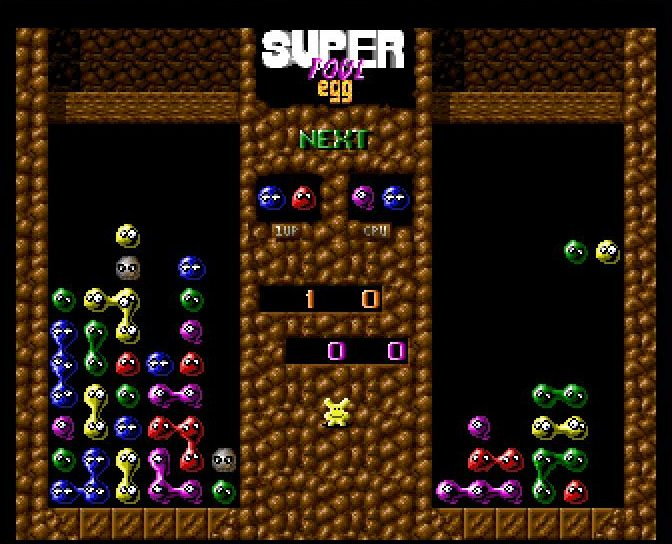
The player (left) is losing to the AI player.

Super Foul Egg is a clone of Puyo Puyo, where pairs of differently-coloured blocks (eggs in this case) drop from above, and the player has to manipulate them into the correct position by moving them left and right, or by rotating the pair. Eggs continue to fall until they rest on another egg. When four or more eggs of the same colour touch each other horizontally or vertically (not diagonally) they vanish, and one or more grey-coloured "foul eggs" drops onto the screen of the opposing player. Foul eggs don't make sets, so they only serve to fill up the screen and hasten a player's defeat. However, eggs that vanish also destroy any adjacent foul eggs. Creating combos whereby disappearing eggs cause a chain reaction in which other eggs fall and make matched sets greatly increases the number of foul eggs that fall on the opponent. The first player to have their screen filled up with un-matched eggs loses.

The game can be played on a single player practice, against a computer AI with two levels of difficulty or in a 2-player head to head mode. The speed of egg drop, and the number of different colours eggs can be adjusted in the main menu.

== Ports ==
Super Foul Egg was later ported to RISC OS by Owain Cole and appeared on the Acorn User cover disk, and this version was later ported to Java. Remakes exist for the Nintendo DS, Mac OS X and iPad.
