= Amiga Power =

British video game magazine

- Amiga Power #65, September 1996, the final issue
- Editor: Editors Matt Bielby (May 1991–July 1992); Mark Ramshaw (August 1992–March 1993); Linda Barker (April 1993–January 1994); Jonathan Davies (April 1994–June 1995); Cam Winstanley (July–December 1995); Tim Norris (March–June 1996); Steve Farragher (July–September 1996)
- Categories: Video game journalism
- Frequency: Monthly
- Circulation: 60,184 (January–June 1992)
- First issue: May 1991
- Final issue Number: September 1996; 65
- Company: Future plc
- Country: United Kingdom
- Based in: Bath
- Language: English
- ISSN: 0961-7310

Amiga Power (AP) was a monthly magazine about Amiga video games. It was published in the United Kingdom by Future Publishing and ran for 65 issues, from May 1991 to September 1996.

== History ==
Chart of Amiga magazines by average monthly circulation. Amiga Power's average of 55,000 copies per month "was a medium-high figure for an independent magazine of its sort at the time".

The first issue of Amiga Power was published in May 1991 after Future Publishing decided, in response to feedback from readers of its magazine Amiga Format, to launch two further magazines with narrowed interests, the other being Amiga Shopper. Whereas the latter would focus on the "serious" side of Amiga computers involving programming and productivity, Amiga Power would be wholly tailored to the gaming audience. Joining the magazine were Matt Bielby and Gary Penn, previously editors of Your Sinclair and The One, respectively, with Bielby being its first editor and Penn as a consultant.

Early in the magazine's history, from its inception, Amiga Power supplied copies of each issue with a coverdisk containing a full game, distributed to the reader free of charge. Future Publishing pioneered the concept of attaching disks to covers of Amiga Format. However, software publishers complained that people were disincentivised from purchasing their games, and Amiga Power, along with other British computer magazines, soon abandoned the practice in favour of "public domain" (i.e. free-of-charge) software, shareware, and demos.

== Philosophy ==
Amiga Power had several principles which comprised its philosophy regarding games. Like almost all Amiga magazines of the time, it marked games according to a percentage scale. However, Amiga Power firmly believed that the full range of this scale should be used when reviewing games. A game of average quality rated on this scale would therefore be awarded 50%. Stuart Campbell offered some rationale for this in his review of Kick Off '96 in the final issue of the magazine:

"Giving something like SWOS [Sensible World of Soccer] 95% is utterly devalued if you also give, for example, Rise of the Robots (a widely-panned fighting game, rated 5% by the magazine) 92%. Percentage ratings are meaningless unless you use the full range, and you can't give credit where it's due if you're pretending that everything's good. What encouragement does that give developers to produce quality? They might as well knock it out at half the cost and in a third of the time if they're only going to get another 3% for doing it properly. Of course, the market will die much faster if people get continually stiffed by crap games, but hey - there's always another machine to move to and start the cycle again."

Amiga Power had a section at the front of each issue listing other magazines' scores for games, some with a star next to them indicating that they "appear[ed] as an exclusive, cover disk or a cover", the purpose of the section being to dissuade their readers from subscribing to those magazines concurrently. According to Campbell, those magazines tended to score games along the pattern of "70%, 70%, 70%, 99%". Amiga Power's methodology proved controversial amongst game publishers, including, in particular, Team17, who would withdraw their advertising and refuse to send them review copies of their games in advance. The magazine found that its competitors' reviewers were influenced by the publishers' campaigns to offer incentives such as perks and free trips in exchange for marking their games highly.

== Style ==
Amiga Power reviews were often written in a very personal, informal manner. The writers often used in-jokes, obscure references and running gags. Writers would sometimes embark on anecdotes of recent happenings in the AP office, or of their interactions with the other AP staff. This contributed to AP's reputation for self-indulgence, but it also created a sense of familiarity.

=== Writers ===
Many prominent video game journalists, such as Kieron Gillen and Stuart Campbell used AP as a first step in their career. Gillen, now a successful writer for Marvel Comics, was one of several writers who started off as an AP reader and letter-writer (under the name "C-Monster") before being employed by the magazine as a freelance contributor. Another was Mil Millington (known to AP readers as "Reader Millington"), who would go on to become a successful novelist, selling over 100,000 copies of his debut Things My Girlfriend and I Have Argued About.

Throughout its 65 issues, AP went through several editors. The editors, ordered by time, were:

1. Matt Bielby, AP's first editor (issues 1-15)
2. Mark Ramshaw (issues 16-24)
3. Linda Barker, AP's only female editor (issues 25–26; issues 27-36 were edited by Stuart Campbell after Linda fell sick, although he never held the title of editor)
4. Jonathan Davies (issues 37-50)
5. Cam Winstanley (issues 51-55)
6. Tim Norris (issues 59-62)
7. Steve Faragher (issues 63-65)

Issues 56-58 were published with no designated editor.

=== Concept reviews ===
A concept review is a review conducted in an abstract manner - basically, any review which deviates significantly from the usual practice of describing a game and analysing its strengths and weaknesses. Usually, it takes the form of a work of fiction (often a screenplay) which indirectly reviews the game through allegory. Amiga Power featured concept reviews on a regular basis. The term itself (never actually used in the magazine) was an ironic play on the "concept albums" released by prog rock bands of the 1970s.

=== Competitions ===
Competitions were also run in AP's distinctive style, often challenging the readers' wit or creativity. AP frequently provided strange additions to the usual competition rules, such as making peculiar threats to people who were ineligible to enter the competition if they tried to, or specifically disallowing reader Stuart N. Hardy from entering the competition.

=== Characters ===
Like its spiritual predecessor, Your Sinclair, Amiga Power had several joke characters who would make irregular appearances in reviews and features. These included Uncle Joe Stalin, who made occasional Ed Comments in an attempt to erase Stuart Campbell from history; The Four Cyclists of the Apocalypse, the only minor deities committed to rigorous consumer testing; Doris Stokes, who returned from the dead as an even worse medium than before, and several others besides.

== Amiga Power regular features ==
=== Oh Dear ===
One of the earliest Amiga Power features which appeared in True Stories was Oh Dear, a small monthly feature showcasing poorly rated Amiga games. Oh Dear was removed very early on in the Amiga Power series.

=== Kangaroo Court ===
A regular feature which presents a so-called video game "crime", followed by the "case for the prosecution", which is a section illustrating why the crime is a negative thing. The penalty was usually an execution. In reflection of the nature of a real kangaroo court, there is no "case for the defense".

=== In The Style Of ===
An "In The Style Of" is, as the name implies, a depiction of a game in the style of something else, most often another game. It started out as a Back Page feature but was soon thrown open to readers as a kind of competition and moved to the news section.

Readers could send in floppy disks containing their In The Style Of drawn in Deluxe Paint, and every month Amiga Power would select the one they liked best and feature it in the magazine.

=== The Disseminator ===
This feature appeared toward the end of AP's life. It was simply a table of recent games, and the percentage scores that they received from Amiga Power and the two main competing Amiga games magazines of the time: The One Amiga and Amiga Action. It also contained annotations on some of the games.

=== Just Who Do We Think We Are? ===
While other magazines used at most a modest box (the "masthead") to introduce their reviewers, Amiga Power dedicated a full page to their staff, with photographs and short sections for each member.

=== Points of View ===
Points of View was a table summarising each AP reviewer's opinion of the main games reviewed that month, if they had played them. The reviewers had room to make a short comment and give their personal score from one to five stars.

=== Do the Write Thing ===
"Do the Write Thing" (an obvious pun on the movie Do the Right Thing) was the magazine's letters page. One distinguishing feature of the letters page was that the magazine gave the letters titles by taking excerpts of the letters' contents out of context, often by going across sentence boundaries or cutting in the middle of a clause.

== Amiga Power irregular features ==
=== APATTOH ===
APATTOH, meaning Amiga Power All Time Top One Hundred, was a yearly feature. It originally started in AP issue No. 0 (a special "preview issue" of Amiga Power given away as an addition to an issue of Amiga Format), and later appeared approximately in every issue whose number was divisible by 12, plus 1.

APATTOH ranked games depending on how the staff liked them. This meant that games that got good press at the time when they came out could end up very low (or entirely absent) on the list. A notable example is Frontier, which most other magazines of the time reviewed positively, but Amiga Power ranked #100 in their top 100 list (emphasising the point by placing it one place below a public-domain version of Pong).

There were two games that held an iron grip on the #1 spot in the list. The first was Rainbow Islands: The Story of Bubble Bobble 2, a coin-op conversion platform game that the magazine controversially deemed their favorite Amiga game for the first two years of its existence. The second was Sensible Soccer, which took over the top position in the first AP Top 100 after its release (the game came out too late for the 1992 chart), and never relinquished it (except to its own sequel Sensible World Of Soccer) for the rest of the magazine's existence.

Listing

First	Number	Final
Rainbow Islands	1	Sensible World of Soccer
Lemmings	2	Gravity Power
Speedball 2	3	Guardian CD32
Sim City	4	Sid Meier's Colonization
Zarch	5	Dyna Blaster
Populous	6	Cannon Fodder
Kick Off 2	7	Syndicate
Falcon	8	Exile
Indianapolis 500: The Simulation	9	Speedball 2
Stunt Car Racer	10	Knights of the Sky
Buster Bros.	11	Chaos Engine
Prince of Persia	12	Alien Breed 3D
Spindizzy Worlds	13	Slam Tilt
Nebulus	14	Micro Machines
Carrier Command	15	Rainbow Islands
Dungeon Master	16	Rod Land
Rick Dangerous 2	17	Zeewolf 2
Ultima 5	18	Gloom
New Zealand Story	19	Monkey Island 1 & 2
The Sentinel	20	Shadow Fighter
Damocles	21	Dune II
Paradroid '90	22	Super Tennis Champs
Plotting	23	Pinball Illusions
Typhoon Thompson	24	Super Skidmarks
Laser Squad	25	Settlers
Klax	26	Super Stardust
SWIV	27	F1GP
Indiana Jones and the Last Crusade	28	Jetstrike CD32
F-19 Stealth Fighter	29	Stunt Car Racer
E-Motion	30	Overkill
Captive	31	Wizkid
Powermonger	32	Head Over Heels
Xenon 2	33	Sim City
Puzznic	34	Super Foul Egg
Super Off Road	35	Car-Vup
F29 Retaliator	36	Empire Soccer
Vaxine	37	No Second Prize
Interphase	38	Tetris Pro
Castle Master	39	Banshee
Car-Vup	40	D/Generation

=== F-Max ===
In its later years, Amiga Power started advertising a fictional refreshment beverage called F-Max, the lightly sparkling fish drink, with the slogan an ocean of refreshment.

== Amiga Power: The Album With Attitude ==
In early 2019, an Amiga Power fan launched a Kickstarter campaign to create an officially licensed AP tribute album containing remixes of assorted Amiga game tunes, accompanied by a booklet featuring contributions from former members of the magazine's team. The campaign was successful, and in July 2020 the finished album was officially released.

Most of the remixes were created by the original composers; among those who contributed to the album were Alistair Bowness, Allister Brimble, Fabio Cicciarello, Mike Clarke, Adam Fothergill, Olof Gustafsson, Jon Hare, Chris Huelsbeck, Carl Jermy, Barry Leitch, Jogeir Liljedahl, Alex May, Anthony Milas, Jason Page, Matthias Steinwachs, and Tim Wright.

The physical album took the form of a small hardback book, with two CDs attached to the inside of the front and back covers, and the 100-page Mighty Booklet sandwiched between them. The first CD – subtitled AP's Pick Of The Pops – featured remixes of music personally selected by AP team members (including former editors Matt Bielby, Mark Ramshaw, Linda Barker, Stuart Campbell, Jonathan Davies, Cam Winstanley, Tim Norris and Steve Faragher, plus others), while the second CD – subtitled The AP Bonus Coverdisk – featured remixes inspired games and demos that appeared on the magazine's cover-mounted disks over the years. The Mighty Booklet contained detailed information about each of the tracks featured on the album, including interviews with the musicians, behind-the-scenes facts, anecdotes and asides from the AP team and full song lyrics; a special The Last Resort section written by Rich Pelley; adverts for F-Max and a Canoe Squad movie; a feature entitled The Bum Line, based on The Bottom Line, listing other albums of interest; and an ongoing storyline (following on from the events of AP65) in which the AP team are restored to life by The Four Cyclists Of The Apocalypse, so they can attend a concert in their honor.

As of August 2020, the album remains available to buy via the original Kickstarter homepage and is also on the websites of C64Audio.com and 010101 Music.

== See also ==
- Amiga Force
- Amiga Survivor
- Digitiser

== Notes ==
=== Works cited ===
- Leibovitz, Liel (2013). God in the Machine: Video Games as Spiritual Pursuit. Templeton Press. ISBN 978-1-59947-437-3.
- Packwood, Lewis (13 June 2019). "The Making of Amiga Power". Retro Gamer. No. 195. pp. 48–53.
