= Amiga Computing =

Monthly computer magazine

- March 1994 cover
- Editor: Derek Meakin (initially)
- Categories: Video game magazines
- Frequency: Monthly
- First issue: June 1988
- Final issue Number: October 1997; 117
- Company: Europress / IDG Media
- Country: United Kingdom
- Language: English
- ISSN: 0959-9630
- OCLC: 877397988

Amiga Computing is a discontinued monthly computer magazine that was published by Europress and IDG in both the UK and US. A total of 117 issues were published. The games section was called Gamer, although later Amiga Action was incorporated into the magazine and became the games section.

== History ==
The magazine's first 80 issues were published by Europress, known as Database Publications from June 1988 to March 1990, Interactive Publishing from April 1990 to May 1991, and finally as Europress Publications From June 1991 until December 1994. It was then sold to IDG and published by them starting Christmas 1994 and until its final 117th issue in October 1997.

== See also ==
- Amiga Survivor
