= List of Amiga CD32 games =

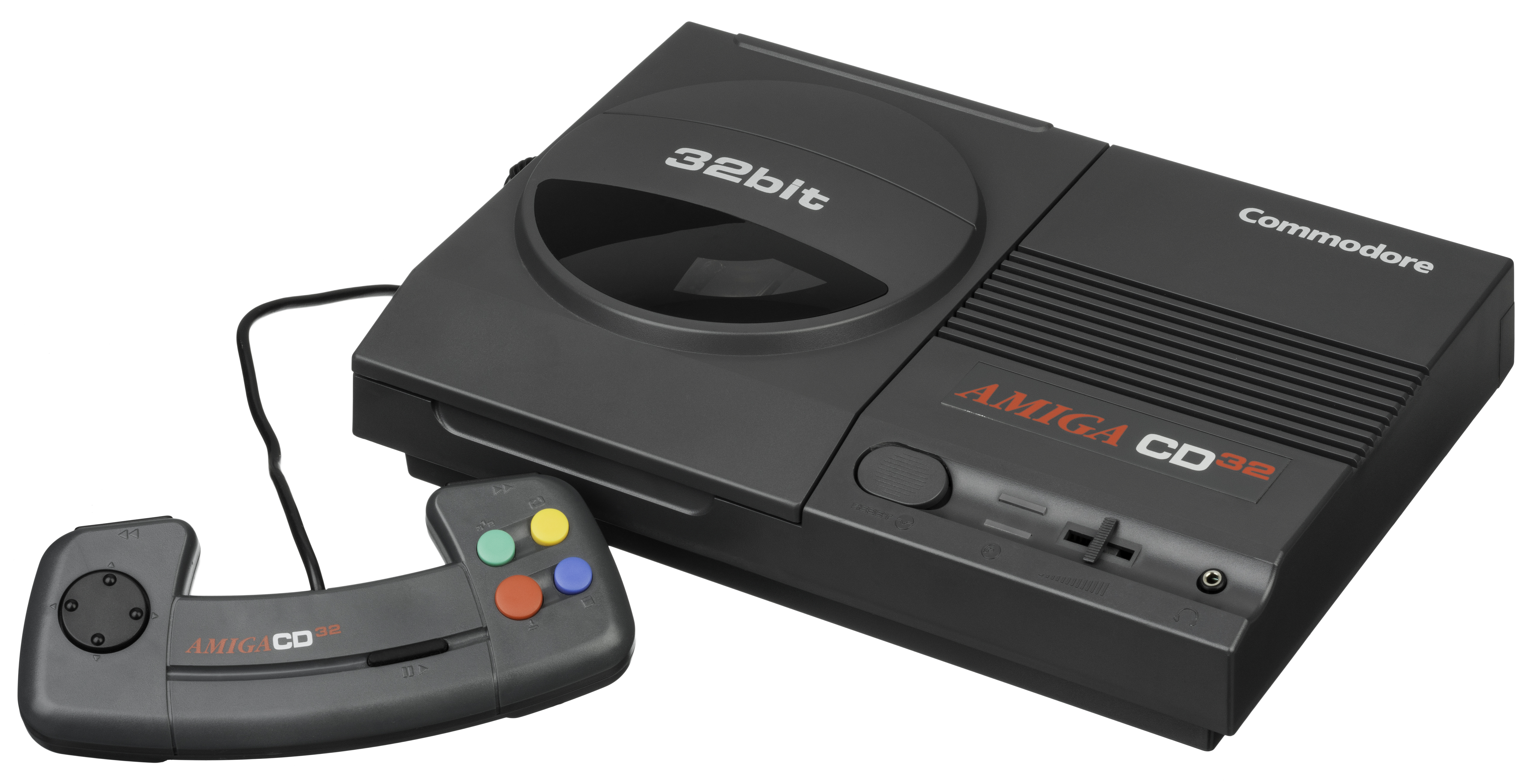
The Amiga CD32 with the standard controller

The Amiga CD32 is a 32-bit home video game console developed and manufactured by Commodore International, released in Europe first on September 16, 1993 and later in Australia, Brazil and Canada. It was the third and last programmable console developed under the Commodore brand. The following list contains all of the known games released commercially for the Amiga CD32 platform.

Unveiled at the September's 1993 World of Commodore show, the CD32 is based on the Amiga 1200 and Commodore had plans to distribute the console in the United States at US$399.99 with two pack-in games as well as six separately sold launch games, despite the Commodore CDTV being a failure. However, a deadline was reached for Commodore to pay US$10.000.000 in patent royalty to Cad Track for use of their XOR patent.

A federal judge ordered an injunction against Commodore that prevented them from importing items into the United States. Commodore had built up a CD32 inventory in their Philippines-based manufacturing facility for the United States launch the consoles remained in Philippines due to the company being unable to sell the system in the region, remaining in the Philippines until the debts owed to the owners of the facility were settled. Commodore declared bankruptcy shortly afterwards, and the CD32 was never officially sold in the United States. Commodore was also not able to meet demand for new units because of component supply problems. Sales of the CD32 in Europe were not enough to save Commodore, and the bankruptcy of Commodore International in April 1994 caused the CD32 to be discontinued only eight months after its debut. During its brief presence on the market, approximately 100,000 Amiga CD32 units of it were sold in Europe alone.

== Games ==
There are currently 147 games on this list. (Note: This number is always up to date by this script.)

Title	Genre(s)	Developer(s)	Publisher(s)	Release date(s)	CD32 version
Akira	Action	International Computer Entertainment	International Computer Entertainment	1994	FMV
Alfred Chicken	Platform	Twilight	Mindscape	1993	CD Audio
Alien Breed 3D	First-person shooter	Team17	Ocean Software	1995	CD Audio and extra levels
Alien Breed: Tower Assault	Run and gun	Team17	Team 17	1994	FMV and extra levels
Arabian Nights	Platform	Krisalis Software	Buzz	1993	
Arcade Pool	Sports	Team17	Team17	1994	CD audio
ATR: All Terrain Racing	Racing	Team17	Team17	1995	Extra levels
Banshee	Shoot 'em up	Core Design	Core Design	1994	CD Audio
Base Jumpers	Platform	Shadow Software	Rasputin Software	1995	CD Audio
Battle Chess	Chess	Almathera Systems	Interplay Productions	1994	CD Audio; Same as the CDTV version
Battletoads	Beat 'em up	Mindscape	Mindscape	1994	
Beavers	Platform	Arc Developments	Grandslam Interactive	1994	
Beneath a Steel Sky	Adventure	Revolution Software	Virgin Interactive Entertainment	1994	CD Audio and voice acting.
Benefactor	Platform	Digital Illusions CE	Psygnosis	1994	CD Audio
Brian the Lion	Platform	Reflections	Psygnosis	1994	CD Audio and extra levels
Brutal Sports Football	Sports	Teque London	Millennium Interactive	1994	CD Audio
Brutal: Paws of Fury	Fighting	Software Sorcery	GameTek	1995	
Bubba 'n' Stix	Platform	Core Design	Core Design	1994	CD Audio
Bubble and Squeak	Platform	Fox Williams	Audiogenic Software	1994	CD Audio
Bump 'N' Burn	Racing	The Dome Software Developments	Grandslam Interactive	1994	CD Audio
Cannon Fodder	Action	Arch Rivals	Virgin Interactive Entertainment	1994	FMV Module
Castles II: Siege and Conquest	Strategy	Almathera Systems	Interplay Productions	1993	CD32 exclusive
Chambers of Shaolin	Action	Thalion Software	Grandslam Interactive	1993	
Chuck Rock	Platform	Core Design	Corkers	1994	
Chuck Rock II: Son of Chuck	Platform	Core Design	Core Design	1994	CD Audio and FMV
Clockwiser	Puzzle	Team Hoi Games	Rasputin Software	1994	CD Audio and FMV and extra levels
D/Generation	Action	Abersoft	Mindscape	1993	
Dangerous Streets	Fighting	Micromania Software	Flair Software	1994	CD Audio
Dark Seed	Adventure	Cyberdreams	Cyberdreams	1994	CD Audio and voice acting
Death Mask	First-person shooter	Apache Software	Alternative Software	1994	CD Audio
Deep Core	Platform	Dynafield Systems	International Computer Entertainment	1993	
Defender of the Crown II	Strategy	Sachs Enterprises	Commodore International	1993	CD32 exclusive
Dennis	Platform	Citizen Software	Ocean Software	1993	CD Audio
Diggers	Puzzle	Millennium Interactive	Millennium Interactive	1993	Launch title. CD Audio
Disposable Hero	Shoot 'em up	Euphoria	Gremlin Graphics	1994	CD Audio
Donk!: Samurai Duck	Platform	The Hidden	Supervision Entertainment	1994	CD Audio
Dragonstone	Role-playing game	Core Design	Core Design	1994	CD Audio
Emerald Mines	Puzzle	Almathera Systems	Almathera Systems	1994	CD32 exclusive
Exile	Action-adventure	Audiogenic Software	Audiogenic Software	1995	CD Audio
Fears	First-person shooter	BOMB Software, Manyk	Attic Entertainment Software	1995	
Fields of Glory	Strategy	Wayne J. Smithson Design	MicroProse	1994	
Fire and Ice	Platform	Graftgold	Renegade Software	1994	CD Audio
Fire Force	Run and gun	International Computer Entertainment	International Computer Entertainment	1994	
Flink	Platform	Psygnosis	Psygnosis	1994	CD32 exclusive
Fly Harder	Shooter	Starbyte Software	Krisalis Software	1994	
Frontier: Elite II	Simulation	David Braben	GameTek	1993	
Fury of the Furries	Action	Kalisto Entertainment	Mindscape	1994	CD Audio
Global Effect	Strategy	Millennium Interactive	Millennium Interactive	1994	
Gloom	First-person shooter	Black Magic Software	Guildhall Leisure Services	1995	
Guardian	Shooter	Acid Software	Acid Software	1994	CD Audio
Gulp!	Puzzle	International Computer Entertainment	International Computer Entertainment	1994	
Gunship 2000	Simulation	MPS Labs	MicroProse	1994	CD Audio
Heimdall 2	Action-adventure	The 8th Day	Core Design	1994	CD Audio
HeroQuest II: Legacy of Sorasil	Role-playing game	Gremlin Graphics	Gremlin Graphics	1994	CD Audio
Humans 1 and 2	Puzzle	Imagitec Design	GameTek	1994	CD Audio
Humans 3: Evolution - Lost in Time	Puzzle	Imagitec Design	GameTek	1996	CD Audio
Impossible Mission 2025: The Special Edition	Platform	MicroProse	MicroProse	1994	FMV
International Karate +	Fighting	System 3	System 3	1994	
International Open Golf Championship	Sports	Really Interesting Software Company	Ocean Software	1993	
James Pond 2: Codename RoboCod	Platform	Vectordean	Millennium Interactive	1993	CD Audio and FMV
James Pond 3: Operation Starfish	Platform	Vectordean	Millennium Interactive	1994	FMV
Jetstrike	Shooter	Shadow Software	Rasputin Software	1994	CD Audio
John Barnes European Football	Sports	Krisalis Software	Buzz	1994	
Jungle Strike	Shoot 'em up	Hyperial Software Developments	Ocean Software	1994	
Kid Chaos	Platform	Magnetic Fields	Ocean Software	1994	CD Audio and more colors
Kingpin: Arcade Sports Bowling	Sports	Team17	Team17	1995	
Lamborghini American Challenge	Racing	Titus France	Paragon Publishing	1994	
Last Ninja 3	Action-adventure	System 3	System 3	1994	
Legends	Action-adventure	Krisalis Software	Guildhall Leisure Services	1996	
Lemmings	Puzzle	DMA Design	Psygnosis	1994	
Liberation: Captive 2	Role-playing game	Byte Engineers	Mindscape	1993	CD Audio and voice acting.
Litil Divil	Action	Gremlin Ireland	Gremlin Graphics	1994	CD32 exclusive; CD Audio
MAG!!!	Simulation	Independent Arts Software GmbH	Greenwood Entertainment Software GmbH	1996	
Manchester United Premier League Champions	Sports	Krisalis Software	Krisalis Software	1994	
Marvin's Marvellous Adventure	Platform	Infernal Byte Systems	21st Century Entertainment	1995	
Mean Arenas	Action	Nite Time Games	International Computer Entertainment	1994	
Microcosm	Rail shooter	Psygnosis	Psygnosis	1994	CD32 exclusive; CD Audio and FMV
Morph	Puzzle	MicroValue	Millennium Interactive	1993	
Myth: History in the Making	Platform	System 3	System 3	1994	
Naughty Ones	Platform	Melon Dezign	InterActive Vision A/S	1994	
Nick Faldo's Championship Golf	Sports	Arc Developments	Grandslam Interactive	1994	
Nigel Mansell's World Championship	Racing	Gremlin Graphics	Gremlin Graphics	1993	
Oscar	Platform	Flair Software	Flair Software	1993	Launch title. CD Audio
PGA European Tour	Sports	The Dome Software Developments	Ocean Software	1995	
Pierre le Chef is... Out to Lunch	Platform	Mindscape	Mindscape	1994	
Pinball Fantasies	Pinball	Digital Illusions CE	21st Century Entertainment	1993	CD Audio
Pinball Illusions	Pinball	Digital Illusions CE	21st Century Entertainment	1994	
Pinocchio	Edutainment	Si-Lab	Giunti Multimedia	1993	CD32 exclusive
Pirates! Gold	Action-adventure	MPS Labs	MicroProse	1994	CD32 exclusive; CD Audio
Power Drive	Racing	Rage Software	U.S. Gold	1994	
Premiere	Platform	The 8th Day	Corkers	1994	
Prey: An Alien Encounter	Adventure	Almathera Systems	Kirk Moreno Multimedia	1994	CD Audio; Same as the CDTV version
Quik the Thunder Rabbit	Platform	Stywox	Paragon Publishing, Titus France	1994	
Rise of the Robots	Fighting	Instinct Design	Time Warner Interactive	1994	CD Audio
Roadkill	Racing	Vision Software	Acid Software	1994	FMV
Ryder Cup: Johnnie Walker	Sports	Really Interesting Software Company	Ocean Software	1994	
Sabre Team	Strategy	Krisalis Software	Krisalis Software	1994	
Seek & Destroy	Shooter	Vision Software	Mindscape	1994	CD Audio
Sensible Soccer: European Champions	Sports	Apache Software	Renegade Software	1994	
Sensible Soccer: International Edition	Sports	Apache Software	Renegade Software	1994	
Shadow Fighter	Fighting	NAPS team	Gremlin Interactive	1995	
Simon the Sorcerer	Adventure	Adventure Soft	Adventure Soft	1994	CD Audio and voice acting.
Skeleton Krew	Action	Core Design	Core Design	1995	CD Audio
Sleepwalker	Platform	CTA Developments	Ocean Software	1993	
Soccer Kid	Platform	Krisalis Software	Krisalis Software	1994	FMV
Soccer Superstars	Sports	Creative Edge Software	Flair Software	1995	
Speedball 2: Brutal Deluxe	Sports	The Bitmap Brothers	Renegade Software	1995	
Sports: Football (Amiga CD Football)	Sports	PlattSoft	Commodore International	1994	CD32 exclusive. CD Audio and FMV.
Star Crusader	Simulation	Human Soft	GameTek	1996	
Striker	Sports	Rage Software	Gremlin Graphics	1994	
Strip Pot	Adult	Pixel Blue	Fin Soft Interactive Software	1994	
Subwar 2050	Simulation	Particle Systems	MicroProse	1994	
Summer Olympix	Sports	Flair Software	Flair Software	1994	CD32 exclusive
Super League Manager	Sports	Audiogenic Software	Audiogenic Software	1995	
Super Methane Bros	Platform	Apache Software	Apache Software	1994	CD Audio and FMV
Super Putty	Platform	System 3	System 3	1994	
Super Skidmarks	Racing	Acid Software	Acid Software	1995	CD Audio
Super Stardust	Shooter	Bloodhouse	Team17	1995	CD Audio and FMV
Super Street Fighter II Turbo	Fighting	Human Soft	GameTek	1996	
Superfrog	Platform	Team17	Team17	1994	
Surf Ninjas	Beat 'em up	Creative Edge Software	MicroValue	1994	FMV
Syndicate	Real-time tactics	Bullfrog Productions	Mindscape	1995	
The Chaos Engine	Run and gun	The Bitmap Brothers	Renegade Software	1994	CD Audio
The Clue!	Adventure	Neo Software	Max Design GmbH & Co	1994	CD Audio and voice acting
The Final Gate	Rail shooter	Alternative Software	Alternative Software	1996	CD32 exclusive. FMV
The Labyrinth of Time	Adventure	Terra Nova Development	Electronic Arts	1994	CD32 exclusive
The Lost Vikings	Puzzle	Silicon & Synapse	Interplay Productions	1994	
The Seven Gates of Jambala	Platform	Thalion Software	Unique	1994	
The Speris Legacy	Role-playing game	Binary Emotions	Ocean Software, Team17	1996	
Theme Park	Simulation	Bullfrog Productions	Mindscape	1995	FMV
Thomas the Tank Engine & Friends Pinball	Pinball	Spidersoft	Alternative Software	1995	
Top Gear 2	Racing	Gremlin Interactive	Gremlin Interactive	1994	
Total Carnage	Shooter	International Computer Entertainment	International Computer Entertainment	1994	
Trivial Pursuit	Board game	The Kremlin	Domark	1994	CD Audio; Same as the CDTV version
Trolls	Platform	Flair Software	Flair Software	1993	CD Audio
UFO: Enemy Unknown	Strategy	Mythos Games	MicroProse	1994	
Ultimate Body Blows	Fighting	Team17	Team17	1994	CD Audio
Universe	Adventure	Core Design	Core Design	1994	CD Audio; Enhanced
Vital Light	Action	Effecto Caos	Millennium Interactive	1995	FMV
Wembley International Soccer	Sports	Audiogenic Software	Audiogenic Software	1994	CD Audio
Whale's Voyage	Role-playing game	Neo Software	Flair Software	1993	
Wild Cup Soccer	Sports	Teque London	Millennium Interactive	1994	
Will Bridge: Initiation Junior	Cards	Will-Bridge	Loridim	1994	CD Audio; Same as the CDTV version
Word Construction Set	Simulation	Lascelles Productions	Lascelles Productions	1994	
Worms	Strategy	Team17	Team17	1995	CD Audio
Zool	Platform	Gremlin Graphics	Gremlin Graphics	1993	CD Audio and FMV
Zool 2	Platform	The Warp Factory	Gremlin Graphics	1994	CD Audio and FMV

== Console Bundles ==
Release date	Name	Games Included
September 1993	CD32 original release	2 games; Diggers and the A1200 version of Oscar without CD audio.
November 1993	Dangerous Streets	4 games; Dangerous Streets, Diggers, Oscar and Wing Commander
March 1994	Spectacular Voyage	6 games; MicroCosm, Chaos Engine, Dangerous Streets, Oscar, Wing Commander and Diggers.
October 1994	Critical Zone	7 games; Cannon Fodder, Diggers, Liberation, Microcosm, Oscar, Project X and Ultimate Body Blows

== Compilations ==
Title	Developer(s)	Publisher(s)	Release date(s)	Notes
Acid Attack	Acid Software	Acid Software	1995	Bundle of CD32 games Guardian, Roadkill and Super Skidmarks
Alien Breed Special Edition/Qwak	Team17	Team17	1994	
Dangerous Streets/Wing Commander	Micromania Software, Origin Systems	Commodore International	1994	CD32 version of Wing Commander is released only as part of this compilation
Diggers/Oscar	Flair Software, Millennium Interactive	Commodore International	1993	Bundled with the CD32 at launch on September 17, 1993. Oscar is the same as A1200 version without CD audio.
Games & Goodies	Multi Media Machine	Multi Media Machine	1993	PD games compilation.
Grandslam Gamer Gold Collection	Arc Developments, Shadow Software, Softeyes	Grandslam Interactive	1995	Bundle of CD32 games Bump n Burn, Jetstrike and Nick Faldo's Championship Golf
Now That's What I Call Games	Multi Media Machine	Multi Media Machine	1993	PD games compilation.
Now That's What I Call Games 2	Multi Media Machine	Multi Media Machine	1993	PD games compilation.
Overkill & Lunar-C	Mindscape, Vision Software	Mindscape	1993	Lunar C is a CD32 exclusive.
Power-Games	Media Team GbR	Media Team GbR	1994	PD games compilation.
Project-X/F17 Challenge	Holodream Software, Team17	Team17	1994	
Project-X/Ultimate Body Blows	Team17	Team17	1994	
Sleepwalker/Pinball Fantasies	CTA Developments, Digital Illusions CE	Commodore International	1993	Bundle of CD32 games Sleepwalker and Pinball Fantasies
The Big 6	Big Red Software, Codemasters, Reflective Designs, Visual Impact	Codemasters	1994	CD32 version of Fantastic Dizzy is released only as part of this compilation. Features CD Audio.
The Classic Lotus Trilogy	Magnetic Fields	Gremlin Graphics	1994	CD Audio
Top 100 Games CD32	US Dreams Inc.	US Dreams Inc.	1994	PD games compilation.

== Amiga CD games compatible with CD32 ==
Title	Genre(s)	Developer(s)	Publisher(s)	Release date(s)
Black Viper	Vehicular combat	Light Shock Software	Neo Software	1996
Fightin' Spirit	Fighting	Light Shock Software	Neo Software	1996
Gamers' Delight	Compilation	Harald Müller	GTI, Schatztruhe	1994
Gamers' Delight II	Compilation	Harald Müller	GTI, Schatztruhe	1995
Inherit the Earth: Quest for the Orb	Adventure	ReaLogic	Softgold Computerspiele GmbH	1995
Kang Fu	Platform	GREat Effects Development	GREat Effects Development	1996
Magic Island	Role-playing game	Arda Team	Signum	1995
Pinball Prelude	Pinball	Effigy Software	Effigy Software	1996
Sixth Sense Investigations	Adventure	CineTech	e.p.i.c. interactive entertainment gmbh	1998
Ultimate Super Skidmarks	Racing	Acid Software	Acid Software	1995
Wendetta 2175	Shooter	Vortex Design	Skills	1996
Whizz	Platform	MicroValue	Flair Software	1994

== Applications ==
Title	Developer(s)	Publisher(s)	Release date(s)
Camel Racer	MMMgroup	MMMgroup	1998
Gangster Pursuit	MMMgroup	MMMgroup	1998
Insight: Dinosaurs	Optonica	Optonica	1994
Insight: Technology	Optonica	Optonica	1994
Mathematik Leicht Gemacht	Amigacenter Düsseldorf	Amigacenter Düsseldorf	1993

== See also ==
- List of Amiga games
- Lists of video games
