= Phillip Nixon =

- Origin: United Kingdom
- Occupation(s): Musician, composer, graphic designer
- Years active: 1990 - present

Phillip Nixon (also known as Philip Nixon or Phil Nixon) is a British composer and graphic designer for video games. His most notable role was as a member of Flair Software (otherwise known as MicroValue) during the 1990s, as an artist, musician and game designer. More recently, he had been part of Rage Software plc until the company went bust in 2003. Nixon has also had other roles working with Millennium Interactive, Hirographics and Horror Soft.

He currently composes music under the pseudonym Dopedemand.

== Credits ==
=== Music ===
- (1990) Turn 'n' Burn (Amiga, Commodore 64)
- (1991) International Ninja Rabbits (Amiga)
- (1991) Elvira: The Arcade Game (MS-DOS, Amiga, Commodore 64)
- (1991) Elvira II: The Jaws of Cerberus (MS-DOS, Amiga, Atari ST)
- (1992) Demon Blue (Amiga)
- (1992) Winter Super Sports 92 (Amiga)
- (1993) Morph (Amiga AGA)
- (1993) Super Morph (SNES) (original composer)
- (1993) Oscar (Amiga AGA, CD32) *
- (1993) Trolls (Amiga AGA, CD32) *
- (1996) Double Agent (Amiga AGA)
- (1997) Trash It (MS-DOS, Saturn, PlayStation) (additional musician)

*The soundtracks for Oscar and Trolls are different between their respective A1200 and CD32 releases.

=== Art ===
- (1989) First Person Pinball (Amiga)
- (1989) Roller Coaster Rumbler (Amiga)
- (1990) Turn 'n' Burn (Amiga)
- (1991) International Ninja Rabbits (Amiga)
- (1991) Elvira: The Arcade Game (MS-DOS, Amiga, Commodore 64)
- (1992) Demon Blue (Amiga)
- (1992) Winter Super Sports 92 (Amiga)
- (1993) Morph (Amiga AGA)
- (1993) Super Morph (SNES)
- (1993) Oscar (Amiga AGA, CD32)
- (1993) Trolls (Amiga AGA, CD32)
- (1995) Power Drive Rally (Jaguar)
- (1998) Millennium Soldier: Expendable (Dreamcast, PlayStation, Windows)
- (2000) Wild Wild Racing (PlayStation 2)
- (2002) Rocky (Xbox, Game Boy Advance)
- (2004) Rocky Legends (PlayStation 2)
