= Soccer Kid =

1993 video game

- Amiga cover art by Tim James
- Developer: Krisalis Software (Note: Ported to 3DO by Team17)
- Publishers: Krisalis Software: Amiga; EU: Krisalis Software; AU: Hot Point Software Super NES; JP: Yanoman Corporation; NA/EU: Ocean Software MS-DOS; NA: General Admission Software, MicroLeague Interactive Software; EU: Krisalis Software, Proein Soft Line 3DO; WW: The 3DO Company Jaguar; WW: Songbird Productions GBA; NA/EU: Telegames PlayStation; EU: Telegames
- Producers: Tim James; Tony Kavanagh
- Designers: Matt Furniss; Neil Adamson; Nigel Little
- Programmers: Nigel Little; Peter Harrap; Shaun Hollingworth
- Artists: Neil Adamson; Phil Hackney; Les Newstead; Mark Potente
- Writer: Gary Penn
- Composer: Matt Furniss
- Platforms: Amiga, 3DO, CD32, Jaguar, Game Boy Advance, MS-DOS, PlayStation, Super NES, Windows Mobile
- Release: October 1993: Amiga; EU: October 1993; AU: 1994 Super NES; JP: 28 December 1993; EU: June 1994; NA: August 1994 MS-DOS; NA: 1994; EU: 1994 CD32; EU: 1994 3DO; NA: 2 May 1994; JP: 9 December 1994 Jaguar; WW: 7 February 2000 Windows Mobile; WW: 4 April 2002 GBA; NA: 30 September 2002; EU: 2002 PlayStation; EU: 13 December 2003
- Genre: Platform
- Mode: Single-player

Soccer Kid (Note: Also known as The Adventures of Kid Kleets in North America on the SNES and Great Soccer Kid (Japanese: グレートサッカーキッド, Hepburn: Gurēto Sakkā Kiddo) in Japan on the SNES and 3DO) is a 1993 side-scrolling platform game developed and published by Krisalis Software in Europe for the Amiga. The player assumes the role of the titular main protagonist who travels across several countries around the world to repair the World Cup by retrieving pieces that were scattered by the alien pirate Scab, the main antagonist who failed to steal and add it to his trophy collection in a robbery attempt. Its gameplay mainly consists of platforming and exploration elements, with a main single-button or two-button configuration, depending on the controls setup.

Conceived by Dean Lester, Soccer Kid was created by most of the same team who previously worked on the Manchester United franchise at Krisalis Software and uses the same game engine as with Arabian Nights, another title made by the developer. After making multiple association football titles, the team experimented with creating a project that fused both football and platform game elements in 1992, developing a physics engine dedicated to the soccer ball that proved to be successful internally. Initially released for the Amiga platform, the title was later ported to other home computers and consoles including the 3DO Interactive Multiplayer, Amiga CD32, Atari Jaguar, Game Boy Advance, MS-DOS, PlayStation and Super Nintendo Entertainment System, each one featuring several changes and additions compared to the original version. Conversions for multiple systems were also in development but never released.

Since its original release on the Amiga, Soccer Kid garnered positive reception from critics who praised multiple aspects such as the presentation, visuals, original gameplay concept and replay value, while some felt divided in regards to the difficulty and sound design, with others criticized some of the repetitive set pieces later in the game. The Super NES version received a more mixed reception from reviewers who felt divided with the graphics, sound design and gameplay. The DOS conversion, although mixed, got a critical response similar to the original Amiga version for its visuals, sound and gameplay. The CD32 port was well received by critics and the 3DO port got mostly positive reviews. The Jaguar port was received with mixed opinions from reviewers who criticized and felt that it did not improve the graphics and audio from the 16-bit versions, while the Game Boy Advance release was received with a more warm reception.

== Gameplay ==
Screenshot from the original Amiga version, showcasing the titular character in London

Soccer Kid is a platform game where players take control of the titular character travelling across the world to retrieve and restore the world cup from the clutches of the alien pirate Scab, who plans to add it to his ever-growing collection. By pressing different buttons at the title screen, the player can change the colours of their character's clothes to represent their favorite team. Each country has three levels that the player must navigate through.

The player character can perform various types of soccer moves such as runs, shots, bicycle kicks, headers and other sorts of moves to either advance in the level, get to hard-to-reach areas or eliminate enemies by using his soccer ball as the main tool. The player starts out with two hearts but by opening random chests scattered throughout the game, they can get more hearts. At the end of each third level, the player must fight a boss, based on stereotypical people associated with their respective country. However, the player must always explore each level to find soccer cards, which are crucial to getting the cup at the end of the game. Only when all the cards are found, the player can see the real ending of the game. Otherwise the bad ending is presented.

Once a country is completed and all the cards in that country are collected, Soccer Kid is transported to a bonus level where he must collect all the food against limited time for a piece of the cup to be obtainable. If all heart pieces are lost, the player character is respawned on a determined checkpoint after losing a life and once all lives are lost, the game is over, though there is an option of continuing. Depending on the version being played, progress is saved differently.

== Development ==
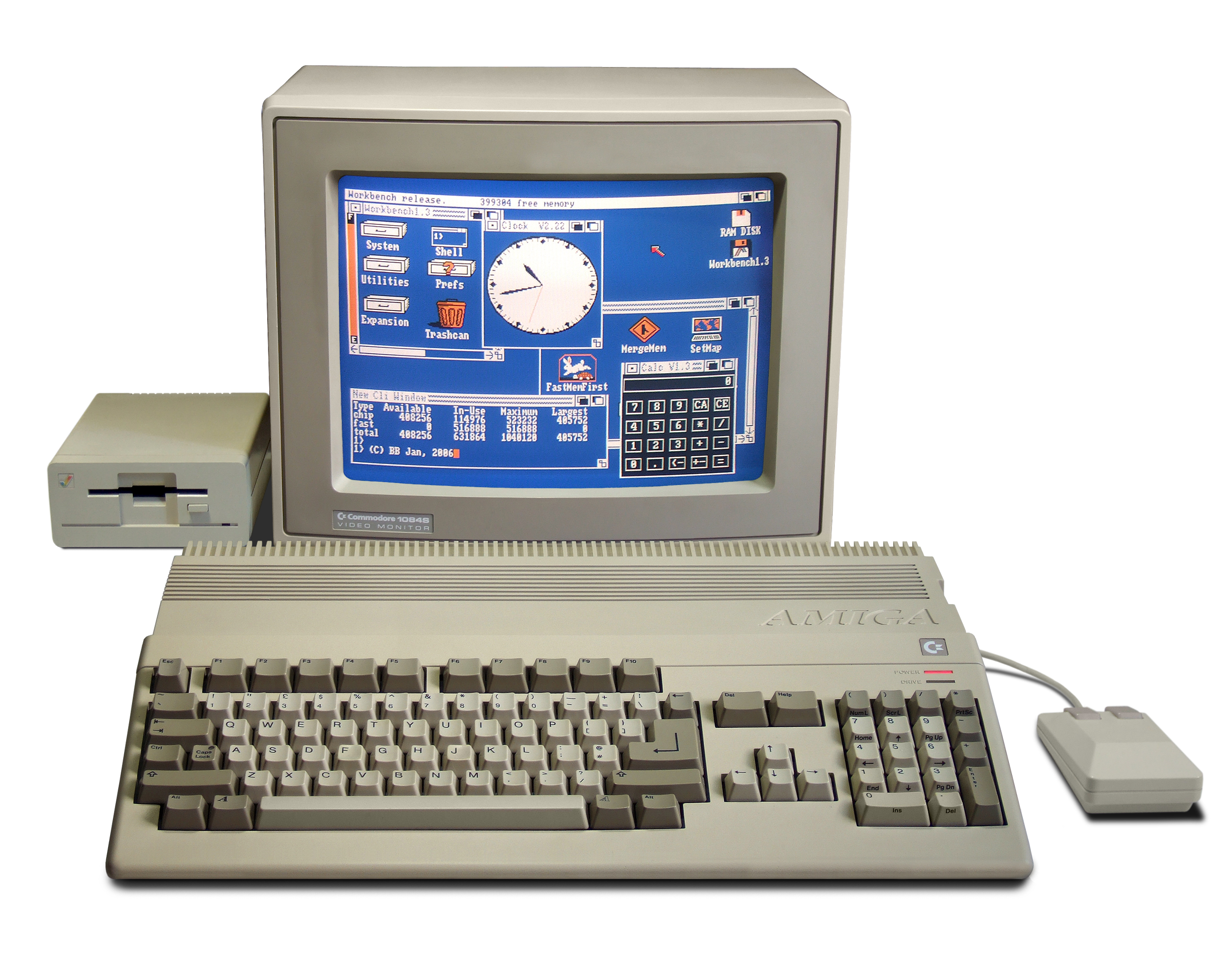
Soccer Kid was conceived on Amiga by most of the original Manchester United team and shares the same game engine as with Krisalis' own Arabian Nights.

Soccer Kid was created by most of the same personnel who worked on the Manchester United series including programmer Peter Harrap, who co-wrote the title alongside Nigel Little, artist Neil Adamson and composer Matt Furniss, among other team members that shared multiple roles during its development process, while the overall concept was conceived by Dean Lester, in addition to also sharing the same game engine as with Arabian Nights, another platform game by Krisalis. Development of the project began in February 1992, when Krisalis co-founder Tony Kavanagh announced their plans for it early in the year and the team wanted to experiment in making a title that mixed football and platforming elements after developing several association football titles. Nigel stated that to assure such project would be playable, the team wrote a primitive physics engine early in its development and implemented real-life rules for the ball to react realistically, which would eventually prove to be feasible after multiple testing phases.

Soccer Kid was previewed across several video game magazines early in development under the title Football Kid, featuring different visuals compared with the final release, which were improved from its original incarnation, while some publications compared it with Sonic the Hedgehog due to its gameplay structure and console-style presentation. The game runs at 50 frames per second, while sprites were made as 64x64 pixel objects. It was originally intended to be released in November 1992 but due to the interest in porting the title to home consoles, the title was moved to next year and faced constant delays prior to its eventual launch. The name of the project was also changed to appeal to consumers when porting across other platforms.

== Release ==
Soccer Kid was first showcased to attendees of Spring ECTS '93 and it was first released for the Amiga in Europe in June 1993, featuring support with the Amiga 1200 for enhanced visuals, while almost all future conversions of the game were developed internally at Krisalis Software and each one features several changes and additions when compared with the original Amiga version. The first console port to be released was for the Super NES, which was first released in Japan by Yanoman Corporation before being published on western regions by Ocean Software in 1994. In North America, this port was renamed to The Adventures of Kid Kleets, and in Japan this port was renamed to Great Soccer Kid. In France, the Super NES version was going to be released as a licensed game based on Moero! Top Striker, known in France as L'École des champions, but this version was never released. During the same year, it was ported to MS-DOS and only released in western regions.

An Amiga CD32 was also developed and published by Krisalis in 1994 featuring mostly the same improved visuals when playing on Amiga 1200, a brand new level that was cut from the original version due to space constrains, as well as a new animated opening sequence created by a Japanese animation studio. A 3DO port developed by Team17 and published by Studio 3DO was first released in North America on 2 May 1994, and later in Japan on 9 December using the name Great Soccer Kid like the Super NES version. The port features redrawn artwork and sports a different GUI. A port of Soccer Kid for the Atari Jaguar was announced in early 1994 after Krisalis was signed to be a third-party developer by Atari Corporation for the system in September 1993, which was originally intended to be published by Ocean on a scheduled Q2 1995 release date, but was never released during the official life span of the Jaguar on the market and went almost unreleased after Atari discontinued the system, until it was eventually picked up for release on 7 February 2000 by independent developer and publisher Songbird Productions. This version of the game features similar visuals to those of the original Amiga version, albeit with an improved color palette and a new UI.

A Windows Mobile conversion of Soccer Kid was released worldwide on 4 April 2002. Several months later, the game was converted to the Game Boy Advance and published by Telegames after being showcased to the public at E3 2002, featuring enhanced visual effects but a lower resolution display. Krisalis later ported the GBA version to PlayStation and was only released in Europe by Telegames on 13 December 2003, becoming both the last version of the game to be officially released and the final version developed by the original team. A version of Soccer Kid for the Atari ST was being developed by Krisalis and was also previewed under its earlier title, Football Kid, by ST Review magazine on their September 1992 issue, but was never released on the platform for unknown reasons. A Sega Mega Drive version was reviewed by Spanish magazine Hobby Consolas, but the Mega Drive version was never released. Likewise, an Atari Lynx conversion of the game was also planned to be published by Telegames, but was never released as well.

== Reception ==
Reception
Aggregate scores
Aggregator	Scores						
Aggregator	Amiga	SNES	MS-DOS	CD32	3DO	Jaguar	GBA
GameRankings	—N/a	—N/a	—N/a	—N/a	—N/a	—N/a	58%
Review scores
Publication	Scores						
Publication	Amiga	SNES	MS-DOS	CD32	3DO	Jaguar	GBA
3DO Magazine	—N/a	—N/a	—N/a	—N/a	3/5	—N/a	—N/a
AllGame	—N/a	—N/a	—N/a	—N/a	4/5	2.5/5	3.5/5
Amiga Action	93%	—N/a	—N/a	—N/a	—N/a	—N/a	—N/a
Amiga CD32 Gamer	—N/a	—N/a	—N/a	88%	—N/a	—N/a	—N/a
Amiga Computing	94%	—N/a	—N/a	88%	—N/a	—N/a	—N/a
Amiga Concept	—N/a	—N/a	—N/a	78%	—N/a	—N/a	—N/a
Amiga Dream	85% (A1200) 85%	—N/a	—N/a	80%	—N/a	—N/a	—N/a
Amiga Format	93% (A1200) 93%	—N/a	—N/a	93%	—N/a	—N/a	—N/a
Amiga Force	88 / 100	—N/a	—N/a	—N/a	—N/a	—N/a	—N/a
Amiga Games	76%	—N/a	—N/a	82%	—N/a	—N/a	—N/a
Amiga Joker	85 (A1200) 85%	—N/a	—N/a	85%	—N/a	—N/a	—N/a
Amiga Mania	76%	—N/a	—N/a	—N/a	—N/a	—N/a	—N/a
Amiga Power	88% (A1200) 85%	—N/a	—N/a	80%	—N/a	—N/a	—N/a
AUI	(A1200) 78%	—N/a	—N/a	—N/a	—N/a	—N/a	—N/a
The Atari Times	—N/a	—N/a	—N/a	—N/a	—N/a	65%	—N/a
ACAR	93%	—N/a	—N/a	—N/a	—N/a	—N/a	—N/a
Consoles +	—N/a	82%	—N/a	—N/a	—N/a	—N/a	—N/a
CU Amiga	93%	—N/a	—N/a	91%	—N/a	—N/a	—N/a
Electronic Gaming Monthly	—N/a	—N/a	—N/a	—N/a	31 / 50	—N/a	—N/a
GamePro	—N/a	—N/a	—N/a	—N/a	16.5 / 20	—N/a	—N/a
Génération 4	86% 85%	—N/a	81%	80%	—N/a	—N/a	—N/a
IGN	—N/a	—N/a	—N/a	—N/a	—N/a	—N/a	7.0 / 10
Joypad	—N/a	82%	—N/a	—N/a	—N/a	—N/a	—N/a
Joystick	88%	—N/a	—N/a	—N/a	—N/a	—N/a	—N/a
MAN!AC	—N/a	42%	—N/a	—N/a	—N/a	—N/a	—N/a
Mega Fun	—N/a	64%	—N/a	—N/a	—N/a	—N/a	—N/a
Micromanía	—N/a	79%	83%	—N/a	—N/a	—N/a	—N/a
Next Generation	—N/a	—N/a	—N/a	—N/a	2/5	—N/a	—N/a
Nintendo Player	—N/a	4/6	—N/a	—N/a	—N/a	—N/a	—N/a
Nintendo Power	—N/a	11.3 / 20	—N/a	—N/a	—N/a	—N/a	2.9/5
The One for Amiga Games	93% (A1200) 93%	—N/a	—N/a	93%	—N/a	—N/a	—N/a
PC Games	—N/a	—N/a	70%	—N/a	—N/a	—N/a	—N/a
PC Joker	—N/a	—N/a	73%	—N/a	—N/a	—N/a	—N/a
PC Player	—N/a	—N/a	69 / 100	—N/a	—N/a	—N/a	—N/a
Play Time	—N/a	58%	73%	—N/a	—N/a	—N/a	—N/a
Player one	—N/a	83%	—N/a	—N/a	—N/a	—N/a	—N/a
Power Play	84%	—N/a	83%	—N/a	—N/a	—N/a	—N/a
Super Power	—N/a	81 / 100	—N/a	—N/a	—N/a	—N/a	—N/a
Tilt	87%	—N/a	—N/a	—N/a	—N/a	—N/a	—N/a
Video Games	—N/a	—N/a	—N/a	—N/a	68%	2/5	—N/a
VideoGames	—N/a	—N/a	—N/a	—N/a	9 / 10	—N/a	—N/a
Awards
Publication(s)				Award(s)			
Amiga Joker (1994)				No. 2 Best Dexterity Game in 1993			

Amiga Power gave the Amiga version a score of 88% with a review by Stuart Campbell. He criticized the player character's moves as being too "fiddly", but praised the graphics and particularly the "fearsome" difficulty, saying it gave the game good value for money. He compared the game to the acclaimed Arabian Nights, saying it was even better due to the superior control and greater focus on platform action.

The 3DO version received a 6.2 out of 10 from Electronic Gaming Monthly. They praised the "technique" and "excellent graphics", but said the sound effects were lacking. GamePro gave it a positive review, citing smooth controls, strong sound effects, good variety of musical tracks, and exceptional graphics.

Reviewing the 3DO version, AllGame's Shawn Sackenheim called Soccer Kid an "impressive" action/platformer that manages to be different as well.

Next Generation reviewed the 3DO version of the game, and said that aside to its confusing plot, it did not brought anything new to platform genre.
