= Power Drive Rally =

1995 video game

- North American cover art
- Developer: Rage Software
- Publisher: Time Warner Interactive
- Programmer: Peter Johnson
- Artist: Phillip Nixon
- Composer: Gordon Hall
- Platform: Atari Jaguar
- Release: NA: October 9, 1995; EU: October 1995
- Genre: Racing
- Modes: Single-player, multiplayer

Power Drive Rally is a 1995 racing video game developed by Rage Software and published by Time Warner Interactive for the Atari Jaguar. It is a conversion of the 1994 racing game Power Drive, which was released on multiple platforms. Revolving around rallying, the game features six real vehicles and circuits based on eight locations around the world. The players participate in various racing events and earn money by qualifying or winning to continue the rally season and repair damage to the car.

Power Drive Rally was programmed by Peter Johnson, who wrote several titles for Ocean Software, being his first and only work on the Jaguar. Johnson and artist Phillip Nixon joined Rage and were offered the opportunity to port the SNES version of Power Drive to the Jaguar. Production started in February 1994, with Johnson and Nixon initially working from home before moving to Rage's Newcastle studio. The team took advantage of the Jaguar's hardware to produce detailed environments and a wider gameplay view.

Power Drive Rally garnered average reception from critics; praise was given to the graphics, variety of tracks, diverse weather conditions, and multiple vehicles, but others expressed mixed opinions regarding the controls and gameplay. Some reviewers also criticized the audio quality, short duration, and inability to play with two people simultaneously. Retrospective commentary for the title has been generally favorable.

== Gameplay ==
A red Fiat Cinquecento (player) racing against a blue Cinquecento (CPU) during a storm in England

Like Power Drive (1994), Power Drive Rally is a racing game played from a top-down perspective similar to Super Sprint and Micro Machines. (Note: Attributed to multiple references:) The player participates in a season of rallying on multiple tracks spread across eight locations around the world: England, Finland, Italy, Arizona, France, Sweden, Kenya and Corsica. The player starts with $28,000 and chooses one of two vehicles: a Fiat Cinquecento or a Mini Cooper S. Each track has different weather conditions that affect the handling and response of the vehicle during the race.

There are various types of racing events in the season ranging from a single qualifying race, rallycross, special stages, and skill tests. Rallycross events are races against a computer-controlled opponent. Special stage events involves the player racing against the clock. Skill tests require the player to test their driving skills on a series of obstacles and the timer is penalized if any traffic cones are knocked over. During gameplay, the player's co-navigator announces incoming turns and hazards. Damage to any component will impair handling and performance of the vehicle on the track.

The player earns money by qualifying or winning to continue the season and repair damage to the car. There are also items to collect placed at predetermined points on the tracks, including money, a stopwatch that freezes time for five seconds, and nitrous to give the player a speed boost. As the game progresses, the player can purchase a higher class vehicle with the money saved, such as a Renault Clio, a Vauxhall Astra, aFord Escort RS Cosworth, or a Toyota Celica GT-Four. There are six vehicles in total, each divided into three groups. Failing to qualify for the next racing event results in paying a re-entry fee to try again and the game is over after running out of funds, though the player can resume their progress via a save function. In addition, the game also has a practice mode with four tracks and a multiplayer mode.

== Development ==
Power Drive Rally for the Atari Jaguar is a conversion of the 1994 racing game Power Drive, which was released on multiple platforms including the SNES and PC. The game was created by Rage Software, which also developed Power Drive. It was programmed by Peter Johnson, who wrote several titles for Ocean Software such as the Amiga version of RoboCop (1989), being his first and only work on the Jaguar. Artist Phillip Nixon, a former Tynesoft and Flair Software staff member, was responsible for the artwork and maps. The music was composed by Gordon Hall, who later scored the soundtrack for Millennium Soldier: Expendable and worked as sound designer at Venom Games. Johnson and Nixon joined Rage and were offered the opportunity to port the SNES version of Power Drive to the Jaguar.

Production began in February 1994, with Johnson and Nixon initially working from home before moving to Rage's Newcastle studio. Nixon created all of the landscapes, pre-rended vehicles, and user interface from scratch, while reusing and updating some of the original SNES artwork to take advantage of the Jaguar's color palette and produce detailed scenery. The team also took advantage of the Jaguar's higher screen resolution capabilities to reduce objects for a wider gameplay view. The Jaguar's Blitter processor is used to drive up to six graphics layers, as well as tracking collision and vehicle damage detection during gameplay. The game runs up to 50 frames per second, as the plan from the start was for it to run smoothly. Johnson praised the Jaguar's hardware for its processing power, but stated that he would not rely too much on the Blitter processor if he were to remake Power Drive Rally. Nixon remembers it as one of his favorite games, but said that it would improve some of the environment assets he considered "rubbish" in retrospect.

== Release ==
The game was first shown at the 1994 Summer Consumer Electronics Show under the name Rally, planning for release in May 1995. Early previews prior to launch touted multiplayer support with the JagLink peripheral. The game made appearances at other tradeshows such as the 1995 Winter CES, the 1995 ECTS Spring event and E3 1995 under its final title, Power Drive Rally. It was later scheduled for an August 1995 release date and shown during an event hosted by Atari Corporation dubbed "Fun 'n' Games Day". The game was published by Time Warner Interactive in North America on October 9, 1995, followed by a European release the same month.

== Reception ==
Reception

Review scores
Publication	Score
Game Players	69%
GamesMaster	69%
Joypad	90%
Next Generation	3/5
Player One	86%
ST Format	57%
Video Games (DE)	68%
Atari Gaming Headquarters	7/10
Atari World	9/10
CD Consoles	2/5
ST-Computer	75%
ST Magazine	75%
Ultimate Future Games	71%
VideoGames	7/10

Award
Publication	Award
VideoGames (1995)	Best Jaguar/Jaguar CD Game

Power Drive Rally received average reception from critics. (Note: Attributed to multiple references: Game Informer, Fusion, Atari Inside, MAN!AC, Fun Generation, Atari Fan, and ReVival.) GameFan's three reviewers praised the game for having some of the best graphical artwork on the Atari Jaguar. They also celebrated its variable weather and surface conditions, controls, and gameplay, but faulted the audio department. GamePro's Lawrence Neves called it a bad Micro Machines rip-off. He found the game's tracks visually well defined, but criticized its controls and soundscapes. Game Players' Patrick Baggatta highlighted the game's audiovisual presentation, numerous courses, varied weather conditions, and multiple vehicles, but felt the action was slow. Next Generation found the skill test events to be fun and noted the polished graphics as well as the variety of tracks, weather conditions, and cars.

VideoGames' Geoff Higgins criticized the co-driver for being annoying and found the skill testing tracks difficult. However, he said the game's smooth visuals and the car's ease of manipulation made it fun. VideoGames named it "Best Jaguar/Jaguar CD Game" of 1995, over Cannon Fodder and Highlander: The Last of the MacLeods. CD Consoles' David Msika found the game very fun, citing the diversity of tracks and weather conditions, but felt that its simple graphics did not take advantage of the Jaguar's capabilities. He also disapproved of the audio department and inability to play with two people simultaneously. Joypad's Nini Nourdine praised the game's visuals, voiceovers of the co-driver, and gameplay, but saw its short duration as a shortcoming.

Player One's Christophe Delpierre praised the game's visual quality and playability, but found the music forgettable and criticized the inability to play with other players simultaneously instead of in turns. ST-Computer's Rainer Fröhlich noted the game's attention to detail in the graphics and convincing driving characteristics of the vehicles, but criticized its poor audio quality. GamesMaster's Les Ellis considered it a disappointing racing game for Jaguar and criticized the weary engine noise, unimaginative tracks and gameplay. He also felt that the visuals were not a major improvement over the Sega Mega Drive and SNES iterations. Atari World's Iain Laskey highlighted the game's numerous tracks and realistic driving dynamics but noted its difficulty in later levels.

Marc Abramson of the French ST Magazine lauded the game's colorful graphical presentation but lamented that the multiplayer mode consisted of taking turns. Ultimate Future Games compared the game to Micro Machines and found it addictive but felt it was slow at times. Video Games' Jan Schweinitz said its design and gameplay were outdated, while ST Format's Stuart Campbell found the game dull and shallow. Atari Gaming Headquarters' Keita Iida wrote that "While Power Drive Rally is straightforward gameplay without the pizzaz that comes in Playstation or Saturn games, it's fun nonetheless and a must buy if all you own is a Jaguar".

=== Retrospective coverage ===
Retrospective commentary for Power Drive Rally has been favorable. The Atari Times' Gregory D. George found the game to be fun but noted that the controls can occasionally seem backwards. Brett Daly of Jaguar Front Page News (a part of the GameSpy network) considered it a substantial improvement over the Mega Drive version, praising its colorful and detailed graphics, sound department, and controls. Author Andy Slaven called it one of the most entertaining games on the Jaguar. Retro Gamer regarded it as one of the best top-down racers of its era, while PCMag said they enjoyed the game due to being well-designed.
