= Deep Core =

Deep Core can refer to:

- Deep Core (video game)
- a region in the Star Wars galaxy
- DeepCore a complementary extension to IceCube Neutrino Observatory
- Deep Core, a 2000 science fiction film
