= Morph (video game) =

1993 video game

Super Morph
- Developer: Millennium Interactive
- Publisher: Sony Imagesoft
- Composer: Graham King
- Platforms: Super NES, Amiga, Amiga CD32
- Release: EU: 1993
- Genre: Puzzle
- Mode: Single-player

Morph (also known as Super Morph on the Super Nintendo Entertainment System release) is a 1993 Super NES, Amiga and Amiga CD32 puzzle video game released by Millennium Interactive. The game's plot is of a child who is given a temporary ability to change between states of solid, liquid, or gas coming in the forms of a cannonball, a rubber ball, a water droplet, and a cloud. The player must go through over 36 challenging levels set in four different zones collecting special cogs from each level in order to fix a machine capable of turning him back into a normal boy.

== Gameplay ==
Before play takes place there is a cutscene of a young boy outside his uncle's house. Once the boy goes inside the house, a scientist lets the boy try out his new machine which can allow him to change state. The machine works but something goes wrong and the machine explodes sending most of its parts everywhere. The boy must now use his new abilities to go around all areas of his uncle's property and find all the missing cogs.

When the game starts, the player has a choice of which area to start in. The choices are Laboratory, Garden, Sewer, or Factory. There are nine levels in each stage, each get harder as you go along. There are also hazards for each of the forms you change into: the rubber ball will deflate when it touches spikes, the rubber ball and cloud will burn when exposed to fire, the water drop will sink when in liquid or above sewage, and the cloud can be sucked in by fans, the metal ball will sink in liquid. The objective for each level is to find a cog that is hidden somewhere in the level. Once you have found all 36 cogs the uncle can fix the machine and Morph can change back to his normal form, a boy.

== Development ==
It is designed and written on Amiga and ST for Flair Software by Peter Johnson with graphics by Phil Nixon and others. Flair created a PC conversion and licensed the game to Millennium Interactive to enable console versions for Sega Mega Drive/Genesis and Super NES to also be released.

Millennium handled the Super NES conversion and created additional levels for the game. Peter Johnson also wrote a Mega Drive version.
