= Extractors =

1995 puzzle video game

- North American cover art
- Developer: Millennium Interactive
- Publishers: EU: Psygnosis; NA: Nova Spring
- Platform: DOS
- Release: 1995
- Genre: Puzzle
- Mode: Single-player

Extractors The Hanging Worlds Of Zarg, also known as Diggers 2, is a puzzle video game developed by Millennium Interactive. It was published in 1995 for DOS by Psygnosis in Europe and by Nova Spring in North America. It is the sequel to 1993's Diggers. A version for the Amiga CD32 was produced but never released.

== Gameplay ==
Extractors is a science-fiction puzzle game in which three different races seek to overthrow the evil Quarriors.

== Development and release ==
Extractors was developed by the Cambridge-based studio Millennium Interactive. Work was initiated in September 1993, shortly after the release of the game's predecessor Diggers. Initially announced as Diggers 2, the project was led by designer and programmer Toby Simpson, who served the same role on the first game. Simpson wished to distinguish Extractors from just being a simple sequel to Diggers by establishing a more complex lore and storyline. Graphically, Extractors utilized over 300 colors on the main interface with the "base" graphics, panels, and backgrounds all having unique pallettes of 256 colors each. While digging was the primary gameplay focus of Diggers, Simpson felt players overlooked its "really stunning" maps by completing objectives too quickly. He described digging in Extractors as "a side thing" to locating fuel and deactivating machines, which the designers placed the fuel and machines on opposites ends of its maps to effectively force players to fully appreciate them. The CD32 version was set to be released in March 1995. However, despite being completed and receiving numerous final reviews, it was cancelled. While there were rumours that the cancellation was due to RAM issues, the actual reason, according to Simpson, was the declining market.

== Reception ==
Reception

Review scores
Publication	Score
Amiga Action	84%
Amiga Computing	89%
Amiga Power	62%
Next Generation	2/5
PC Gamer (US)	73%
Amiga CD32 Gamer	88%
CU Amiga	75%
PC Joker	56%
Power Play	58%
Score	3/10
The One	75%

Extractors received mixed reviews. Next Generation gave the game two stars out of five, and stated that "A couple of flaws keep Extractors from being as entertaining or addictive as the other puzzle games it imitates. It's extremely repetitive, and it suffers from an awkward interface - a real liability in a game like this. Only the patient need apply."
