= Sabre Team =

1992 video game

- Developer: Krisalis Software
- Publisher: Krisalis Software
- Director: Tony Kavanagh
- Programmer: Richard Teather
- Artist: Phillip Hackney
- Composer: Matt Furniss
- Platforms: Amiga, CD32, Atari ST, MS-DOS
- Release: 1992: Amiga, ST; 1994: MS-DOS, CD32
- Genre: Turn-based strategy
- Mode: Single-player

Sabre Team is a turn-based strategy video game developed and published by Krisalis Software. It was released for Amiga and Atari ST in 1992, then MS-DOS and Amiga CD32 in 1994.

== Plot ==
The player leads an elite specialist strike team that defeats terrorists by rescuing their hostage and prisoners of war, and stopping their war machines. The terrorists are keeping five British soldiers as hostages.

== Gameplay ==
The player commands a team of four Special Air Service operatives, and spends Action Points to make their moves. In each of five scenarios, the player chooses four of their eight team members to bring on the mission. Each mission involves the team saving all the hostages and killing all of the terrorists.

== Reception ==
James V. Trunzo reviewed Sabre Team in White Wolf Inphobia #52 (Feb., 1995), rating it a 2 out of 5 and stated that "As with several games today, Sabre Team is a good idea (though not a very original one) that's poorly implemented. I keep trying out of a sense of fairness - maybe I am just a lousy player - but I think the game is flawed. It's overprices and too difficult. In spite of attractive graphics and some decent interface elements, the cons of Sabre Team overwhelm the pros."

Simon Byron for The One #50 said that "Sabre Team is one of the most engrossing action strategy games around".

Tony Dillon for CU Amiga rated the game 83% and said that "The computer puts up a realistic fight, and this creates just enough suspense for you to hold your breath every time an enemy soldier raises their weapon."

ST Action rated the game 94% and stated "Sabre Team is the best Strategy game your ever likely to see on the ST, the graphics are truly unbelievable and the sounds pretty damn hot as well."

Cam Winstanley for Amiga Power said that "the only criticism I've got is that it's only got five missions, which isn't enough".

== Release ==
The game has since been re-released for digital distribution on GOG and Steam in 2021.
