= Donk =

Donk may refer to:

== Places ==
- Donk, Antwerp, a village in the municipality of Mol, a province of Antwerp, Belgium
- Donk, a village in the municipality of Berlare, province of East Flanders, Belgium
- Donk, a village in the municipality of Maldegem, province of East Flanders, Belgium
- Donk, a village in the municipality of Herk-de-Stad, province of Limburg, Belgium

== People ==
- Donk (gamer) (born 2007), Russian professional Counter-Strike 2 player Danil Kryshkovets

=== With the surname ===
- Marinus Anton Donk (1908–1972), Dutch mycologist (author abbreviation: Donk)
- Ryan Donk (born 1986), Surinamese footballer

==== van de Donk ====
- Daniëlle van de Donk (born 1991), Dutch footballer
- Wim van de Donk (born 1962), Dutch politician

== Arts, entertainment, and media ==
=== Music ===
- "Donk" (song), by Soulja Boy Tell 'Em
- "Morning Dew (Donk)", by Beyoncé
- Donk, a subgenre of UK Hard House music; also a percussion sound used in this genre

=== Other uses in arts, entertainment, and media ===
- Donk, a character in the film Crocodile Dundee and its sequels
- Donk! The Samurai Duck!, a 1994 platform video game
- Donk, also Donk bet, a term in poker
- Donk, the drummer of The Weirdos, a fictional band created by Coldplay for their Music of the Spheres World Tour

== Other uses ==
- A 1971-76 Caprice or Impala original or customized; see Hi-Riser
- Penclawdd RFC in Wales, nicknamed "The Donks"
- Donk, a type of modified car

== See also ==
- Donka (disambiguation)
