= Magic Island =

Magic Island may refer to:

- Magic Island (Hawaii), a peninsula and neighborhood in Honolulu, Hawaii
- Magic Island (West Virginia), an island in the Kanawha River
- The Magic Island, a 1929 book by William Seabrook
- Magic Island (film), a 1995 American film
- Magic Island (radio series), a radio program that aired in the 1930s and 1940s
- Magic Island (video game), a 1995 video game developed by Arda Team
