= Traps 'n' Treasures =

1993 video game

- Cover art
- Developer: Roman Werner
- Publishers: Starbyte Software (Germany); Krisalis Software
- Designers: Roman Werner; Ruedi Hugentobler
- Programmer: Roman Werner
- Artists: Roman Werner; Orlando Petermann
- Composer: Ruedi Hugentobler
- Platform: Amiga
- Release: Germany: 1993; WW: 1994
- Genres: Platform, action-adventure
- Mode: Single-player

Traps 'n' Treasures is a platforming and action-adventure video game developed by Roman Werner for the Amiga. Initially released in Germany in 1993 by Starbyte Software, the English version of the game was released several months later, in 1994, by Krisalis Software.

== Plot ==
In 1641 the pirate captain Jeremy Flynn and his crew are sailing around Tortuga when the compass breaks. Drifting off course they reach the pirate Redbeard's base on Devil's Island where they get attacked. Redbeard's men kidnap the crew and take all valuables while Flynn manages to hide from them. It is now up to him to rescue his crew, get back his treasures and escape Devil's Island.

== Gameplay ==
Flynn in the Skull-Grotto stage

The player takes the role of Jeremy Flynn, who is controlled using a joystick and the keyboard. The joystick is used for movement (running, jumping, ducking, crawling), using the primary weapon (a dagger at first), operating switches/levers and carrying boxes. Additionally a parachute can be deployed to slow his descent, as long falls can kill Flynn. The weapon does not work while in the air and is replaced by a ground-stomp used to destroy breakable blocks. The keyboard's arrow keys are used to navigate through Flynn's inventory while the Space key uses/activates the selected inventory item. The Escape key kills Flynn in case the player falls into a trap and cannot escape by other means.

Flynn starts with a life meter of five units (which can be extended) and three extra lives. Touching enemies, enemy projectiles or environmental hazards (poison, spikes) will reduce the life meter depending on the specific enemy. When the life meter reaches zero Flynn will lose a life, the game ends when the last life is lost. The game has four stages and the player will be given a password between each of them which can be used to continue a game after shutting it off or losing all of the lives, but the password only provides level access and does not save any score or other inventory items. The life meter can be filled by picking up potions or buying food. Additionally Flynn can pick up fruit from defeated enemies and pots which fill a "Vitamins" gauge which, when full, is reset to zero and rewards one life point.

During the game Flynn can pick up treasure such as silver/gold coins and money bags. They are found in treasure chests, dropped by enemies, lying in the open or in secret coin-collection bonus stages (which are started by hitting a hidden block with the head). The stages contain shops where the player can use the gold to purchase a variety of items, including stronger weapons (with more power and/or better range), food to restore health, an item to extend the life meter and bombs to blow up walls. The player can also find parts of treasure maps. When six parts are collected a bonus game starts where gems must be collected. At the end of the stage the player receives gold depending on how many gems were picked up and also at least one additional extra life.

== Development ==
Roman Werner was born in 1967 from a father who was a cameraman and a mother who was a director assistant, both working for the Swiss national television. His first contact with videogames was with the game Pong that his father brought back from a trip to Taiwan. Werner experienced with graphic design and programming, but was first known in the Swiss developer scene as music producer. In 1988, he started working for Linel, the only official Amiga game publisher in Switzerland, for who he made demo songs for the software SoundFx and also the title music of the game Eliminator. Next year he composed the music for Leonardo and Clown-O-Mania, both Swiss games produced by Starbyte Software.

It was towards the end of 1989 that Roman Werner decided to create his own game: Traps 'n' Treasures. What motivated him was his love for platform games and the desire to create an Amiga game as good as those he played on consoles, but this was the first game he programmed and it was not a small project. On November 20, 1990, the Christmas Party of Starbyte Software took place in Bochum, Germany. On this occasion, developers, freelancers and business partners are gathered. Roman Werner decided to seize the opportunity by taking a demo of his game with him that evening. The general manager and his assistant quickly showed interest in his game and a contract was offered to him. At that point everything seemed to be going well, but during the negotiations on the price they reached an impasse. The general manager decided to take a dice out of his drawer and asked Werner to choose between even and odd. Werner won and signed the contract with the price he wanted, but the contract allowed for eight months to complete the game. At the time Roman thought it was feasible, but by his own admission he was inexperienced in game development and did not realize that this time frame was too short.

In July 1991, he realized that it would not be possible to finish the game within the time limit. Although he had already invested many hours in the graphic design, he decided to ask Orlando Petermann to do it, but as Petermann was an experienced designer and the task is not trivial, he was asked to be paid. Werner did not mind, even if it meant missing out on a significant part of the payment he was to receive from Starbyte Software. Ruedi Hugentobler, another friend of Werner's, was responsible for the level design and also composed the sound effects. Everything seemed to be going well in the process of creating the game, until December 13, 1991. On that day, Roman Werner received a letter from Starbyte Software giving him a final deadline of January 2, 1992 to finish his game, or they would sue for damages to the tune of 200,000 Deutsche Mark. Werner felt devastated at the time, but after several phone calls he managed to convince them that finishing the game was the best outcome for everyone.

In July 1993, after almost four years of development, Traps 'n' Treasures was finally finished. Roman Werner prepared the final version, taking care to replace the title screen with a dummy picture, so that Starbyte could not publish and distribute the game until they had paid Werner. A few days later, a friend from Germany called him and congratulated him on the release of his game in stores. Starbyte had simply replaced the dummy picture with a title picture from one of the previous versions and released the game to the market. Soon after, Starbyte Software became insolvent and declared bankruptcy. With no money in sight, Werner thought he could offer his game to another publisher, but he changed the mind: the rights to his game were tied up and perished with the company. Some time later the company was taken over by another one whose name was also Starbyte, the only difference was that it operated under the name of the former CEO's wife. According to Werner, this was a way to recover the rights to the games without having to pay their debts. After hiring a lawyer, the creator of Traps 'n' Treasures managed to recover some money, about 4,000 Swiss francs for almost four years of work. In spite of this mitigated balance, Roman Werner affirmed that he would not hesitate to start again if it were to be done again.

== Reception ==
The reviews of Traps 'n' Treasures in the Amiga Magazines are of 79% or more, except for two: one of 49% and another one of 65%. The 49% review comes from Amiga Computing, the author is unknown, but the negative points are that the game is just another platformer, the puzzle solving aspect is more frustrating than intriguing and that Jeremy Flynn dies too easily when he falls from platforms. The 65% review comes from CU Amiga, even though the magazine was known as "soft" for their game ratings. Amiga Format gave a review of 82%, and Rob Mead, the author, recognized nonetheless the difficulty and the frustrating side of the game but for him it is part of the challenge. Amiga Power gave Traps 'n' Treasures 79%. Steve McGill, who wrote the review also found the game to be on the harder side of things concerning the enemies the players meet, but on the puzzle solving aspect he thought the difficulty is perfect. He also mentioned the beauty of the graphics, the numerous possibilities and tools the player can use. Traps 'n' Treasures was also awarded game of the month by the German Amiga-Magazin. It received a note of 10.3/12. Carsten Borgmeier, who wrote the review, described it as an attractive platform game with all the refinements of the genre, but also mentioned that it is an arcade-adventure for advanced players.

== Legacy ==
Traps 'n' Treasures is part of the games that were produced in the early days of game design in Switzerland. The game is representative of this period with other games such as War Heli, Ball Raiders and Clown-O-Mania. Traps 'n' Treasures is mentioned as an emblematic Swiss video game in Switzerland by Memoriav, or as cult by the swiss newspaper 20 minuten. It is also mentioned in a blogpost from the Swiss National Museum, who did an exposition on video games in 2021. Traps 'n' Treasures was presented in the gamezFestival in Zurich as part of a retrospective of the early days of game development in Switzerland.
