= The F.A. Premier League Stars =

1999 video game

- Developer: EA UK
- Publisher: Electronic Arts
- Platforms: Windows, PlayStation
- Release: 1999
- Genre: Sports
- Modes: Single-player, multiplayer

The F.A. Premier League Stars is a sports video game released in Europe in 1999 for Microsoft Windows and PlayStation, developed by EA UK and published by Electronic Arts. A sequel, The F.A. Premier League Stars 2001, was released in 2000.

== Gameplay ==
The game begins with the player selecting a Premier League team for a full‑season campaign, using the official league interface and roster data from the current Premiership year. After installation and setup, the player chooses a club and immediately enters scheduled league fixtures, starting with the first match of the season. Each match awards a quantity of STARS based on performance metrics such as scoring, passing, and overall play. These STARS function as upgrade points that can be assigned to individual players on the squad, increasing attributes like shooting or other abilities. Opposing teams also improve over the course of the season, so later matches—such as mid‑season encounters with stronger clubs—reflect parallel progression. The game also includes a Power Bar system that allows the player to vary the strength of shots, passes, and crosses by tapping or holding the appropriate button. A speed‑boost mechanic lets players sprint in short bursts governed by a replenishing meter. Friendly matches can be played to practice controls, and during regular play, receiving passes causes players to take a small step back before continuing movement. Goals trigger an on‑screen announcement and are followed by multiple automatically selected replay angles before returning to kickoff.

== Reception ==
Reception

Review score
Publication	Score
GameSpy	87%

The game received fairly positive feedback. GameSpy rated the game an 87 of 100 stating that "the only people who won't like FAPLS are those who object to anything which isn't FIFA, so this game won't be too popular outside of the UK, but if it were up to me, everyone would be taught to love this game. A gem."

Games Domain called The F.A. Premier League Stars fun but lacking certain options.
