= Rally Championships =

Rally Championship is a 1994 racing video game developed by Flair Software and releaced for PC MS-DOS and Amiga platforms.

== Gameplay ==
Players select from several rally types and difficulty levels (five in total), and must first qualify by completing a trial run within a time limit. Tracks include a city circuit, a snow track, and a desert course, and feature changing weather conditions such as rain and snow. Collectible items scattered across tracks include fuel canisters, money, a wrench for auto-repair, and mystery items with unpredictable effects. Between races, players may repair or refuel their vehicle, upgrade tires (three types, one per surface), purchase a new car, or hire a co-driver.

== Reception ==
Tomasz Dominiak who reviewed it for the Polish magazine Świat Gier Komputerowych. While praising the graphics as polished and well-crafted, Dominiak criticized the game for lacking originality compared to its recent competitors, describing as a clone of Lotus III but without a track editor. The reviewer was also disappointed by the absence of Gravis Ultrasound (GUS) support, noting that the game only supports the older Sound Blaster. Despite these criticisms, the reviewer found the game sufficiently engaging to spend an extended period playing it, and ultimately recommended it, awarding it gave a score of 70%.

The game also received numerous other reviews in contemporary game video press (in titles such as German magazines like Amiga Games, Amiga Joker, Play Time, PC Joker or PC Player.
