= The F.A. Premier League Stars 2001 =

2000 video game

- Developer(s): Electronic Arts; Krisalis Software (Game Boy Color)
- Publisher(s): Electronic Arts; THQ (Game Boy Color)
- Platform(s): Windows, PlayStation, Game Boy Color
- Release: PlayStation, Windows: EU: 2000; Game Boy Color: EU: June 8, 2001
- Genre(s): Sports
- Mode(s): Single-player, multiplayer

The F.A. Premier League Stars 2001 is a sports video game released in Europe in 2000 for Microsoft Windows and PlayStation, developed and published by Electronic Arts. A version was also released the following year for the Game Boy Color, developed by Krisalis Software and published by THQ. It was released as Bundesliga Stars 2001 in Germany, LNF Stars 2001 in France, and Primera División Stars 2001 in Spain.

It is a follow up to F.A. Premier League Stars.

== Gameplay ==
As with the previous entry in the series, players select a single team to develop through the course of a season, building points through the "Stars System" by performing feats such as using specific players to score, or scoring a hattrick, which are then expended to improve player characteristics such as pace, shot strength and tackling.

The "Stars Stakes" multiplayer mode allows players to challenge one another, putting up players as a forfeit if they lose.

Commentary for the PlayStation and Windows versions of the game is provided by Clive Tydesley and Andy Gray with Richard Keys as the studio host.. Licensed music was provided by Ministry of Sound.

== Reception ==
Reception

Review scores
Publication	Score		
Publication	GBC	PC	PS
Computer and Video Games	N/A	N/A	2/5 stars
Official Nintendo Magazine	68%	N/A	N/A
PlayStation Official Magazine – UK	N/A	N/A	4/10
PC Zone	N/A	65%	N/A

The PlayStation and Windows versions received largely negative reviews.

The title was described as the "anti-FIFA" in a 4/10 review in Official PlayStation Magazine, which bemoaned "poor graphics, limited gameplay and some shocking glitches".

CVG's 2/5 review compared the title unfavourably to International Superstar Soccer and FIFA titles on the PlayStation, arguing that "it may have all the real player names and the odd nice feature, but these can't make up for the pig ugly graphics and clumsy gameplay".

The Game Boy Color version received mixed reviews.

Official Nintendo Magazine's 68% review noted that the "game moves really well and the action is fast paced", with "controls [that are] easy to master" but cautioned that "scoring is difficult and the teams and colours will soon be obsolete after the end of the season".

John Fogarty of GBX magazine gave the title a score of 73%, praising its "uncomplicated controls" and noting that it was "easy to get into", but criticising out of date team and player information.
