= Realm (video game) =

1996 video game

- North American box art
- Developer: Flair Software Ltd.
- Publisher: Titus France
- Platform: Super Nintendo Entertainment System
- Release: NA: December 1996; EU: February 27, 1997
- Genres: Action, platform
- Mode: Single-player

Realm is a platform video game with shooting elements that was released exclusively for the Super Nintendo Entertainment System in 1996.

== Gameplay and premise ==
Firing red energy shots at a bunch of enemies that resemble fireballs.

Realms takes place in the year 5069, with the player in control of a young Biomech cyborg. An alien invasion has devastated the entire planet of Earth, killing almost every human being and devastating its cities. Earth's last hope is a cyborg that travels through five levels (realms) to defeat the enemies with laser weapons and other Space Age guns and save what is left of humanity.

== Reception ==
Reception

Review scores
Publication	Score
HobbyConsolas	80/100
M! Games	53%
Mega Fun	63%
Player One	77%
Superjuegos	85/100
Total!	3-
Video Games (DE)	55%
Nintendo Acción	80/100
Power Unlimited	59/100
Super Play	80/100
Super Power	72%
Ultra Player	2/6

Realm received average reviews. Nintendo Power commended the game's challenge and graphics, but considered the lack of a save function and unbalanced difficulty to be negatives. Electronic Gaming Monthly highlighted the game's weaponry and bosses, but found the gameplay to be a bit simplistic. GamePro's Captain Cameron commented positively on the game's hefty challenge, imaginative settings, and colorful graphics, but criticized the animations and music.
