= Whizz (video game) =

1994 video game

- Developer: Flair Software
- Publishers: Flair Software; SNES; Titus Software; PlayStation, Saturn; Konami; JP: B-Factory
- Platforms: Amiga, CD32, MS-DOS, Super NES, PlayStation, Saturn
- Release: EU: 1994; Amiga: EU: 1994; CD32: EU: 1994; MS-DOS: EU: 1994; SNES: NA: November 1996; PlayStation: EU: February 1997; JP: 18 September 1997; Saturn: EU: August 1997; JP: 29 August 1997
- Genre: Platform
- Mode: Single-player

Whizz is an isometric platform game published for the Amiga, CD32, and MS-DOS in 1994. In 1996, it was released for the Super NES and in 1997 the PlayStation and Saturn. A Mega Drive version was planned but never released. Within the game, "Whizz" refers to the player character's magical talents, being short for "wizard". Marketing for the game used it in reference to the slang term for urination, such as in the advertising slogan "Ever feel the need for a Whizz real bad? You will."

== Reception ==
Coach Kyle gave the Super NES version a negative review in GamePro, criticizing the average graphics, "bland hero who definitely needs some personality", and most especially the isometric perspective, which he said makes jumping onto platforms and avoiding enemies frustratingly difficult.
