= Manchester United Championship Soccer =

1995 video game

- Cover art featuring the Manchester United players. Main focus goes to Ryan Giggs and Eric Cantona.
- Developer: Krisalis Software
- Publisher: Ocean Software
- Composer: Matt Furniss
- Series: Manchester United
- Platform: Super NES
- Release: EU: 1995
- Genre: Traditional soccer simulation
- Modes: Single-player, multiplayer

Manchester United Championship Soccer is a 1995 soccer video game developed by Krisalis Software and published by Ocean Software for the Super NES. The game was released in Germany under the title Lothar Matthäus Super Soccer. A Sega Mega Drive version was planned but never released.

== Gameplay ==
The game was released at the time when Manchester United was starting to dominate the English football scene. All the teams from the 1994–95 FA Premier League are represented. All-star teams and various European clubs that participated in the European competitions from the 1994/95 season are also included. During the gameplay the player can choose two type of views: top down and isometric view of the pitch.

== Images ==
Top-down perspective.
Manchester United vs Chelsea.

Isometric view.
Benfica vs Paris SG.

== See also ==
- Manchester United (video game series)
- List of association football video games
