= Naughty Ones =

1994 video game

- Developer: Melon Dezign
- Publisher: Interactivision
- Programmer: Jacob Gorm Hansen
- Artist: Henrik Mikkelsen
- Platforms: Amiga, Amiga CD32
- Release: 1994
- Genre: Platform

Naughty Ones is a platform game for the Amiga and Amiga CD32 released by Interactivision in early 1994. The game was programmed by Jacob Gorm Hansen (Paleface) and the graphics were done by Henrik Mikkelsen (Seen), both from the demo group Melon Dezign. The game originally released for a cost of £25.99 and required 1 MB of storage.

== Gameplay ==
Naughty Ones is a platformer game that allows for single player or simultaneous two player play. Players control one of the two naughty ones, John and Jim. The game consists of five worlds that must be beaten before a boss fight with an evil king. The words consist of linked rooms, and the player must find a key in each room to move on to the next. Each level contains various powerups and enemies.

== Reception ==
Naughty Ones generally received favorable reviews upon release. Its gameplay and handling were praised by reviews, but the soundtrack was less positively received. The floppy disk version was also generally rated higher than the CD32 version. Amiga Format stated that "it can't boast flash graphics or a huge number of levels, but what Naughty Ones has got is stacks of gameplay. It's an original, enjoyable and challenging platform romp" and gave it a score of 86%. Amiga Power called it a "simple", "old-fashioned", and "cute" two-player platform arcade game and gave it a score of 90%. In contrast, the Swedish technology magazine Datormagazin gave it a 2/5.
