= The Speris Legacy =

1996 video game

- Developer: Binary Emotions
- Publisher: Team17
- Platforms: Amiga, Amiga CD32
- Release: 1996
- Genre: Action RPG
- Mode: Single-player

The Speris Legacy is a 1996 action role-playing game developed by Binary Emotions and published by Team17 that was released for the Amiga 1200 and Amiga CD32.

== Gameplay ==
The Speris Legacy is an action RPG with a top down perspective.

== Plot ==
The plot involves an inheritance dispute between two princes—Gallus and Kale—in which the former murders his brother to secure his position as king. However, Kale had secretly made a pact with his friend, Cho, that would place him as king should Kale be murdered. Players assume the role of Cho, and adventure throughout the land of Speris.

== Development ==
The game was heavily inspired by the Legend of Zelda series, with other influences including Secret of Mana and The Secret of Monkey Island. According to CU Amiga, The Speris Legacy nearly wasn't released, and Team17 reconsidered after the success of Worms and Alien Breed 3D.

== Reception ==
Reception

Review scores
Publication	Score
CU Amiga	74% (Amiga)
Amiga Format	69% (Amiga)
Arcane	3/10 (Amiga)

The Speris Legacy met with mediocre critical reception, and many reviews compared it to The Legend of Zelda. Edge magazine called it "shamelessly derivative" of The Legend of Zelda: A Link to the Past. CU Amiga gave the Amiga version of Speris Legacy an overall score of 74%, and criticized its map design, calling the game world "a pretty big place with lots of a locations and rather too little to do", further expressing that the game's lack of hints regarding the player's goals results in "endless meandering" and frustration. Amiga Format gave the Amiga version a score of 69%, while they praised Speris Legacy's "lovely" graphics, they described its gameplay as "a drudge" and "relentless tedium". Amiga Format heavily compared Speris Legacy to Zelda, stating that it emulates the "look and feel" of Zelda well, but falls short in regards to its gameplay, which lacks "a sense of achievement". They further criticized the size of Speris Legacy's environments, and expressed that this, in addition to the lack of hints or reassurance in the game's puzzlesolving, makes puzzles unnecessarily difficult.

Arcane magazine gave Speris Legacy an overall score of three out of ten, expressing that the audio and visuals emulate Zelda well, but the game 'isn't fun' and lacks "a sense of accomplishment". Arcane further noted that while the game isn't difficult, the player is left "constantly in a state of confusion about where you are supposed to be going and what goals you must achieve to get there", furthermore calling its puzzles "masochistic" in this regard.
