= Mad Professor Mariarti =

1990 video game

- Title screen
- Developer(s): Krisalis Software
- Publisher(s): Krisalis Software
- Platform(s): Archimedes, Amiga, Atari ST
- Release: 1990
- Genre(s): Puzzle-platform
- Mode(s): Single-player

Mad Professor Mariarti is a puzzle-platform game developed and published by Krisalis Software in 1990.

== Plot ==
Chaos has ensued in Professor Mariarti's five laboratories, as various items of equipment and other inanimate objects have come to life as a result of experiments having gone wrong, and are now a hindrance to the professor's work. Mariarti must shut down his laboratories in order to end the chaos, prove his sanity and avoid being put into a psychiatric hospital.

== Gameplay ==
A switch, some electric zappers and three conveyor belts on one of which is a steel wrench, which is one of the items that must be collected.

The five laboratories are Biological Observations, Chemical Research Dept., Computer Laboratory, Spacerocket Development and Central Power Control. The first four laboratories may be visited in any order; Central Power Control becomes accessible once the other four have been closed down. The Amiga and Archimedes versions combine horizontal scrolling with vertical flip-screen. The Atari ST version uses flip-screen in both directions.

In each laboratory, Mariarti must find and use a number of items in order to open up new areas and eventually to shut down the room. Examples of items and how they are used are:

- Jam jars used as colour filters to read a secret door code
- A diver's helmet enabling the Professor to enter a pressure chamber without being crushed to death
- A bean that is to be planted in a pot to grow a beanstalk, which can then be climbed
- A battery used to power a robot, which will then fetch another item that cannot otherwise be reached

Screenshot shows two different enemy characters. The bottom panel shows, from left to right, the Professor's items, the currently selected item and score, his remaining lives, current weapon and health level.

A number of enemy characters are seen in the game, mostly themed around the laboratory in which they are situated (e.g. walking floppy disks and joysticks in the Computer Laboratory, round-bottom flasks and molecular models in the Chemical Research Dept, and mutant plants and animals in Biological Observations).

Initially, Mariarti's weapon is an infinite supply of spanners. Other weapons can bought from Tool Vendors using tokens that are scattered around the labs. There are also static obstacles that either drain the Professor's health gradually (such as puddles of acid) or kill him instantly if touched (such as electric zappers of various designs). Most of these cannot be controlled in any way, but some can be disabled via a switch situated somewhere in the laboratory. In each laboratory, Mariarti must eventually reach a second switch in order to close down the room. When a room is shut down, Mariarti is taken back to the lobby where he can choose another laboratory to visit next.
