= Sega Chess =

1991 video game

- Developer: Probe Software
- Publisher: Sega
- Producer: Neil Young
- Programmer: Antony Lill
- Artist: Hugh Riley
- Composer: Krisalis Software
- Platform: Master System
- Release: EU: November 14, 1991
- Genre: Computer chess
- Modes: Single-player, multiplayer

Sega Chess (also known as Master Chess) is a 1991 chess video game developed by Probe Software and published by Sega for the Master System.

== Gameplay ==
The game can be viewed from overhead or in a pseudo 3D mode. There are nine skill levels: beginner to grandmaster. Resigning is not included in the game. Sampled speech option is included which is useful for people with visual impairment. Features that help new players include a hint system, the ability to undo moves, swapping sides at any time and forcing the computer to make its move prematurely. In Adaptive mode, the computer will decide its move in the time it takes the player to complete a turn. Problem mode places a specific chess problem for the player to solve. For the hardest challenge, in Infinite mode the computer will take as long as it needs to make its move.

== Reception ==
Reception

Review scores
Publication	Score
Games-X	4/5
Mean Machines	77%
Sega Force	93%
Sega Power	5/5
Video Games	80%

Mean Machines concluded: "A decent, if expensive, game which is best recommended to chess fans who have no-one to play against." Sega Force praised the difficulty curve and summarized: "Against competition, a brilliant adaptation of an ancient game". Sega Power said: "If you can't play it, it won't teach you, but lonely chess players will absolutely love this version." Video Games praised the graphics and controls. Games-X said: "Sega Chess is everything a chess buff could possibly want on the Master System, and offers an enjoyable game to players at all skill levels."
