= John Barnes European Football =

1992 soccer video game by Krisalis

- Developer: Krisalis
- Platforms: Amiga; Atari ST
- Release: EU: 1992
- Genre: Sports
- Modes: Single-player, multiplayer

John Barnes European Football is a soccer video game developed by Krisalis and published in 1992. The game was endorsed by footballer John Barnes.

== Gameplay ==
The game resembles Krisalis' previous video game Manchester United Europe. However, the camera is closer to the ball, producing a faster action.

== Reception ==
Reception

Review score
| Publication | Score |
|---|---|
| Power Unlimited | 68/100 |

Power Unlimited gave a score of 68% summarizing: "With a side view instead of a camera angle high above the field, this game is different from others. However, proper control over the players is lacking, which means you are constantly lagging behind. However, there are a large number of options."
