= Trolls (video game) =

1992 video game

- Developer: Flair Software
- Publishers: Flair Software; Capstone Software (MS-DOS)
- Platforms: Amiga, MS-DOS, Commodore 64, CD32
- Release: 1992: Amiga, MS-DOS; 1993: CD32
- Genre: Platform

Trolls is a Troll doll-themed platform game developed and published by Flair Software for Amiga in 1992 and ported to MS-DOS, Commodore 64 and Amiga CD32.

== Release ==
Trolls was originally released in 1992 for Amiga, and was ported to MS-DOS and Commodore 64. The Amiga CD32 port came in 1993 with full soundtrack. The DOS port compared to the original Amiga release lacks some background graphics and voices, but contain music during gameplay and enemies are easier to eliminate.

It was also released with An American Tail: The Computer Adventures of Fievel and His Friends and Rock-A-Doodle Computerized Coloring Book on the Capstone CD Game Kids Collection.

== Gameplay ==
In this platform game you play as a Troll who rescues Troll babies. The game only states that the Troll babies were lost, and in the Medialand world we can read that they were kidnapped by someone with the initials K.G. (this could refer to Karl Guggenheim, who sold tiny Trolls in the 1960s in gumball machines).

The Trolls hair changes with a collectable, which give special powers, yellow: speed, red: shield, blue: higher jump, white: wings, green: beer, black: slow you down.

You can eliminate enemies with the classic Mario jump, and it's important to find the yo-yo. It's not just a weapon, but you need it to continue through some levels, destroy impassable blocks, and as a ninja rope to swing. In addition to collecting a predetermined number of babies, you need to find the Pigstop sign, from which a flying pig will take you to the next level.

To open the last door, you must complete all seven worlds, with four levels. The worlds are: Toyland, Medialand, Soda Pop, Fairground, Fableland, Boardgame and Candyland.

== Reception ==
Reception

Review score
Publication	Score
Amiga Format (CD32)	82%

Amiga Format gave the game an 82% rating. Oscar in Toyland received indifferent reviews.

== Legacy ==
In 1993, Oscar was released on Amiga, Amiga CD32, DOS and SNES, based on Trolls. It featured different levels and due to the Trolls license having lapsed, all Troll imagery was replaced with Flair's original creation, Oscar.

Since 2009, three Oscar games were released on Nintendo DSi: Oscar in Toyland, Oscar in Movieland (a port of original Amiga game) and Oscar in Toyland 2.
