= Vital Light =

1994 video game

- Developer: Efecto Cao SL
- Publisher: Millennium Interactive
- Platforms: Amiga, Amiga CD32
- Release: 1994
- Genre: Action

Vital Light is a 1994 action video game developed by Spanish studio Efecto Cao SL and published by Millennium Interactive for the Amiga and Amiga CD32.

== Plot and gameplay ==
The player - an adept gamer - travels to the planet RAMROM to complete an arcade game that no one has beaten before.

While incorporating other play styles, at its core the game is a shoot-'em-up.

== Reception ==
=== Amiga ===
CU Amiga felt that while it borrowed from other games, Vital light still had an original flavour. The One argued that while other games try to be different and end up being "confused and substandard", this game knows what it wants to be and does it very well. Amiga Format felt it offered a new expression of an old gaming concept. Amiga Power summed up their review by stating "Vital light is crap". Amiga Mania deemed it one of the best 16 bits Spanish video games.

=== Amiga CD32 ===
The One praised the game's "well-designed control method". Gamer said that while the game was an enjoyable fast-paced experience it lacked a decent plot.
