= Time Paradox =

1996 video game

- Developer(s): Flair Software
- Publisher(s): Flair Software
- Platform(s): MS-DOS
- Release: 1996
- Genre(s): Adventure
- Mode(s): Single-player

Time Paradox is a point-and-click adventure game developed and released by Flair Software for the MS-DOS in 1996 only in Europe.

== Plot ==
A futuristic agent named Kay is sent on a mission to stop the evil Morgana Le Fay. She first travels back in time to "the time of dinosaurs and cavemen" (sic), and then jumps to the medieval era in order to find and rescue the wizard Merlin from Morgana's castle and eventually defeat the sorceress.

== Development ==
Time Paradox has been in development for several years, having been in first publicly shown in 1993. The game was originally supposed to be released as Genesis already in the first half of 1994 and to be a FMV based, featuring digitized graphics. Besides the PC version, the developers also planned to create the Amiga computer and CD32 versions.

== Reception ==
The game was poorly received by gaming press upon its release, including receiving one star out of five in Germany's PC Player. It also got low review scores in Polish magazines Gambler (48%) and Secret Service (2/10). Retrospectively, Adventure-Archiv rated it a 57% in 2002.

== See also ==
- Chronicles of the Sword, another 1996 adventure game with a similar quest to defeat Morgana
