= Base Jumpers =

1995 video game

- Developer(s): Shadow Software
- Publisher(s): Rasputin Software
- Platform(s): Amiga, Amiga CD32
- Release: 1995
- Genre(s): Platform
- Mode(s): Multiplayer

Base Jumpers is a platform game developed by Shadow Software for the Amiga. It was published in 1995 by Rasputin Software.

In this game, the player is a BASE jumper who jumps from towers. Each tower is a level through which the player must work himself, up towards the top in a platform gaming sequence. To collect bonuses, the player must find and pick up letters that form certain combinations (500 in total).

When reaching the top, there is a base jumping contest between the players which consists of trying to reach the bottom first while avoiding obstacles and opening their parachute in time. Up to four players may play simultaneously.
