= Krisalis Software =

British video game developer

Krisalis Software Limited
- Logo of Krisalis Software from 1995 to 2001
- Formerly: Teque Software Development Limited (1987)
- Type: Private
- Industry: Video games
- Founded: 1987; 39 years ago
- Defunct: 30 November 2001
- Fate: Dissolved
- Headquarters: Rotherham, England
- Key people: Tony Kavanagh; Peter Harrap; Shaun Hollingworth; Mark Edwards; Matt Furniss

Krisalis Software Limited was a British video game developer and publisher founded by Tony Kavanagh, Peter Harrap, and Shaun Hollingworth in 1987 under the name Teque Software

== List of games ==
=== Developed ===
Year	Title	Platform(s)		
Year	Title	PC	Console	Handheld
1987	Moley Christmas	ZX Spectrum	—	—
1987	Terramex	Acorn Archimedes, Amiga, Amstrad CPC, Atari ST Commodore 64, MSX ZX Spectrum	—	—
1988	Chubby Gristle	Amiga, Amstrad CPC, Atari ST, Commodore 64, ZX Spectrum	—	—
1988	The Flintstones	Amiga, Amstrad CPC, Atari ST, Commodore 64, MSX, ZX Spectrum	—	—
1988	Laser Squad	MSX, MS-DOS	—	—
1989	Blasteroids	Amiga, Amstrad CPC, Atari ST, Commodore 64, MSX, MS-DOS, ZX Spectrum	—	—
1989	Continental Circus	Amiga, Amstrad CPC, Atari ST, Commodore 64, MSX, ZX Spectrum	—	—
1989	Thunderbirds	Amiga, Amstrad CPC, Atari ST, Commodore 64, MSX, MS-DOS, ZX Spectrum	—	—
1989	Passing Shot	MSX, MS-DOS	—	—
1990	Badlands	Amiga, Amstrad CPC, Atari ST, Commodore 64, ZX Spectrum	—	—
1990	Manchester United	Acorn Archimedes, Amiga, Amstrad CPC, Atari ST, Commodore 64, ZX Spectrum	—	—
1990	Jahangir Khan's World Championship Squash	Acorn Archimedes, Amiga, Amstrad CPC, Atari ST, Commodore 64, MS-DOS, ZX Spectrum	—	—
1990	Mad Professor Mariarti	Acorn Archimedes, Amiga, Atari ST	—	—
1991	Manchester United Europe	Acorn Archimedes, Amiga, Amstrad CPC, Atari ST, Commodore 64, MS-DOS, ZX Spectrum	—	—
1991	Face-Off	Amiga, Atari ST	—	—
1991	Rogue Trooper	Amiga, Atari ST	—	—
1991	Hill Street Blues	Amiga, Atari ST, MS-DOS	—	—
1991	Sega Chess	—	Master System	—
1992	European Club Soccer	—	Mega Drive	—
1992	European Football Champ	Amiga, Atari ST, Commodore 64	—	—
1992	Sabre Team	Amiga, Atari ST, MS-DOS	Amiga CD32	—
1992	Graham Taylor’s Soccer Challenge	Amiga, Atari ST	—	—
1992	John Barnes European Football	Amiga, Atari ST	Amiga CD32	—
1993	Soccer Kid	Amiga, MS-DOS	Amiga CD32, PlayStation, SNES	Game Boy Advance
1993	Arabian Nights	Amiga	Amiga CD32	—
1994	Alone in the Dark	RISC OS	3DO	—
1994	Manchester United Premier League Champions	Amiga, MS-DOS	Amiga CD32	—
1995	Alone in the Dark 2	—	3DO	—
1995	Manchester United: The Double	Amiga, MS-DOS	—	—
1995	Manchester United Championship Soccer	—	SNES	—
1996	Legends	Amiga, MS-DOS	Amiga CD32	—
1996	Magic Carpet	—	PlayStation, Sega Saturn	—
1996	Player of the Year	MS-DOS	—	—
1996	Space Hulk: Vengeance of the Blood Angels	Microsoft Windows	PlayStation, Sega Saturn	—
1996	Star Fighter 3000	MS-DOS	—	—
1997	Ultra CD-i Soccer	—	Philips CD-i	—
1997	Z	—	PlayStation, Sega Saturn	—
1998	Lego Chess	Microsoft Windows	—	—
1998	Theme Hospital	—	PlayStation	—
1999	F.A. Manager	—	PlayStation	—
2000	Legoland	Microsoft Windows	—	—
2000	Airport inc.	Microsoft Windows	—	—
2000	Cricket 2000	—	PlayStation	—
2000	The F.A. Premier League Football Manager 2000	—	PlayStation	—
2001	The F.A. Premier League Stars 2001	—	—	Game Boy Color

=== Published ===
Year	Title	Platform(s)	
Year	Title	PC	Console
1990	World Championship Boxing Manager	MS-DOS	—
1990	Jahangir Khan's World Championship Squash	Amiga, Amstrad CPC, Atari ST, Commodore 64, MS-DOS, ZX Spectrum	—
1990	Manchester United	Acorn Archimedes, Amiga, Amstrad CPC, Atari ST, Commodore 64, ZX Spectrum	—
1990	Mad Professor Mariarti	Acorn Archimedes, Amiga	—
1991	Revelation	Acorn Archimedes, Amiga, Atari ST	—
1991	Manchester United Europe	Amiga, Amstrad CPC, Atari ST, Commodore 64, MS-DOS, ZX Spectrum	—
1991	Face-Off	Amiga, Atari ST	—
1991	Rogue Trooper	Amiga, Atari ST	—
1991	Hill Street Blues	Amiga, Atari ST, MS-DOS	—
1991	Chuck Rock	Acorn Archimedes	—
1992	John Barnes European Football	Amiga, Atari ST	Amiga CD32
1992	Graham Taylor's Soccer Challenge	Amiga, Atari ST	—
1992	Sabre Team	Amiga, Atari ST, MS-DOS	Amiga CD32
1992	Shadoworlds	Amiga, Atari ST, MS-DOS	—
1993	Soccer Kid	Amiga, MS-DOS	Amiga CD32
1993	Arabian Nights	Amiga	Amiga CD32
1994	Manchester United Premier League Champions	Amiga, MS-DOS	Amiga CD32
1994	Fly Harder	Amiga	Amiga CD32
1994	Traps 'n' Treasures	Amiga	—
1995	Manchester United: The Double	Amiga, MS-DOS	—
