= Elvira: The Arcade Game =

1991 video game

- Developer(s): Flair Software
- Publisher(s): Flair Software
- Designer(s): Mick Hedley; Phil Scott; Phillip Nixon
- Programmer(s): Mick Hedley
- Composer(s): Adam Gilmore
- Platform(s): Amiga, Atari ST, MS-DOS, Commodore 64
- Release: 1991
- Genre(s): Platform
- Mode(s): Single-player

Elvira: The Arcade Game is a side-scrolling platform game released in 1991 for the Amiga, Atari ST, Commodore 64, and MS-DOS by Flair Software. The game is loosely based upon the film Elvira: Mistress of the Dark, released in 1988, and she features as the playable character.

== Plot and gameplay ==
The game features two worlds: the Underworld of Fire and the Arctic Earth, which must be unlocked in order to reach the third, the Castle of Transylvania. According to the ghost in the game's introduction, by right the castle belongs to Elvira. In their quest, players are able to use spells and weapons, as well as collect rune stones, food in order to replenish their health, and treasure chests. If they encounter difficulty in completing a segment of their current quest, the player may purchase information from a trader, found within each level, using rune stones as a currency.

== Development ==
Elvira: The Arcade Game was programmed by Flair Software in conjunction with Horrorsoft, the developer of Elvira: Mistress of the Dark and Elvira II: The Jaws of Cerberus. Elvira: The Arcade Game was licensed for publication by Queen B Productions, the owners of the Elvira franchise. It was released in four languages: English, French, German and Italian.

== Reception ==
Elvira: The Arcade Game received generally favourable reviews. CU Amiga awarded the game 82% and praised the graphics, describing the game as "brilliant arcade fun," but lacking any longevity. Similarly, Amiga Power pointed to the high level of polish, but lamented the fact that there were "no gameplay surprises," and so awarded it 70%.
