= F.A. Manager =

1999 video game

- Cover art
- Developer: Krisalis Software
- Publisher: Eidos Interactive
- Platform: PlayStation
- Release: EU: 1999
- Genre: Sports
- Modes: Single-player, multiplayer

F.A. Manager is a football management simulation game, released for the PlayStation in 1999. It was developed by Krisalis Software and published by Eidos Interactive. The game features the official Football Association licence.

== Gameplay ==
F.A. Manager is a football management simulation game that puts the player in charge of a team of their choice from the top five English divisions (Premier League to the Conference, as it was known at the time) from the 1998–99 season.

Commentary is provided by Brian Moore, with edited match highlights presented to the player (rather than the full match) and the ability to pause to make tactical adjustments or substitutions.

== Reception ==
The game was awarded 3/5 in CVG, with reviewer Steve Key describing "scouting the transfer market, haggling with clubs, or bringing one of your youth team players through the ranks" in-game as "satisfying", but ultimately suggesting that readers seek out of Premier Manager: Ninety Nine as the best football management simulation game on the console.

Extreme PlayStation magazine's Doug Williams wrote that "if you're a fan of endless stats and football facts F.A. Manager causes no problems", but argued that it lacked the "polish, shine and user-friendliness of Premier Manager", in his 68% review.

Giving the game a score of 76%, Rich Marsh of PlayStation Plus described the game as "dead easy to use and crammed with masses of information", but criticised the fact that teams relegated or promoted in the 1997–98 season were not reflected in the game.
