= Arabian Nights (1993 video game) =

1993 video game

- Developer: Krisalis Software
- Publisher: Krisalis Software
- Designers: Simeon Pashley; Darren Hebden
- Programmer: Simeon Pashley
- Artist: Darren Hebden
- Composer: Matt Furniss
- Platforms: Amiga, Amiga CD32
- Release: EU: 1993
- Genre: Platform
- Mode: Single-player

Arabian Nights is a platform game first released on the Amiga in 1993. It was produced by Krisalis Software. The game was originally released on two floppy disks but later became available on CD for the Amiga CD32 release. The game was developed by Visiware Studios.

The player controls Sinbad Junior, a lowly gardener who witnesses the kidnap of the princess by a dragon. After Sinbad Junior tries to save her from the flying dragon, he ends up falling back to Earth and becoming unconscious before awakening in a prison accused of sorcery and capturing the woman he tried to save.

== Gameplay ==
The game begins in these dungeons as the player fight his way out over traps and through guards, and then through another nine stages in nine different environments. Throughout levels a hint interface is featured in the game where pressing space bar when a light bulb appears over the player's head will result in him being rewarded with a clue or a warning about danger up ahead.

There are many secret doors around the levels which can be accessed by ducking at the correct spot and pressing attack. These secret doors are usually marked by a door or a small tunnel in the background graphic. Most secret doors contain the currency of the level, which changes frequently. In the prison level that comes first, the currency is gems, but the currency becomes coins in the forest level that comes after the prison level. This currency can be used to purchase key items from NPCs around the stage necessary to progress through the level.

Sometimes the gameplay changes significantly. For example, in one level the player is required to fly a magic carpet, and in another he is required to race an opponent on a mine cart through tunnels.

== Reception ==
Reception

Review score
Publication	Score
Power Unlimited	72/100
