= Manchester United Europe =

1991 video game

- Developer: Krisalis Software
- Publisher: Krisalis Software
- Programmer: Peter Harrap
- Artists: Mark Potente; Neil Adamson
- Composer: Matt Furniss
- Series: Manchester United
- Platforms: Amiga, Archimedes, Amstrad CPC, Atari Lynx, Atari ST, Commodore 64, MS-DOS, ZX Spectrum
- Release: 1991; 1992: MS-DOS; 1993: Lynx
- Genre: Sports
- Modes: Single-player, multiplayer

Manchester United Europe is a sports video game released in 1991. It was developed by and published by Krisalis Software for the Amiga as the follow-up to the 1990 video game Manchester United which had sold over 100,000 copies. Conversions were released for the Acorn Archimedes, Atari ST, MS-DOS, Amstrad CPC, Commodore 64 and ZX Spectrum, and Atari Lynx.

== Gameplay ==
In Manchester United Europe, the player guides either Manchester United or another club through the UEFA Cup, European Cup, Cup Winners Cup, Super Cup and the Intercontinental Cup.

== Development ==
Computer and Video Games magazine reported in its supplement Hand-Held Go! in May 1992 that Krysalis were developing an Atari Lynx version of the game.

== Reception ==
Computer and Video Games magazine reviewed the game for the Amiga in their August 1991 issue giving it a score of 84 out of 100. The game entered the Gallup All Formats chart at the number one position.
