= Deep Core (video game) =

1993 video game

- Developer(s): Dynafield Systems
- Publisher(s): International Computer Entertainment
- Programmer(s): Johan Lindahl
- Artist(s): Josh Dworznik; Jack Dworznik
- Composer(s): John Keding; Tomas Danko
- Platform(s): Amiga, CD32
- Release: 1993
- Genre(s): Platform
- Mode(s): Single-player

Deep Core is a futuristic platform game developed by Dynafield Systems for the Amiga. It was published in 1993 by International Computer Entertainment.

== Plot ==
Captain Dawnrazer has been sent to save an underwater nuclear research base which has been invaded by strange aliens. Dawnrazer must work himself through nine levels (with additional sublevels and bonus levels). The game includes six weapon which can be upgraded via power-ups.

== Reception ==
Reception

Review scores
| Publication | Score |
|---|---|
| Hull Daily Mail | 50% |
| Aktueller Software Markt | 9/12 |
| Amiga Joker | 57% |
