= Dangerous Streets =

1993 video game

- Developer: Micromania
- Publisher: Flair Software
- Platforms: Amiga, CD32, MS-DOS
- Release: 1993
- Genre: Fighting
- Modes: Single-player, multiplayer

Dangerous Streets is a fighting game developed by Italian game studio Micromania and released by Flair Software for the Amiga, Amiga CD32, and MS-DOS in 1993. It was poorly received by critics. Dangerous Streets was bundled with the CD32 in The Dangerous Streets Pack.

== Gameplay ==
Gameplay screenshot, showing a match between Luisa and Macalosh

Dangerous Streets offers two-player battles, single matches against the computer, and a tournament mode. The eight characters can be controlled with either a joystick or a keyboard and have the ability to punch or kick in the range of weak, medium, and strong. The characters in their portraits below the playfield will appear more injured as they take more damage in game.

=== Characters ===
- Sgiosa Capeli, a musically tasteless DJ at one of the roughest night spots in Italy who also appears to be a master of Shotokan karate.
- (Switzerland) Pinen, an obese lorry driver who works for a local software company. His street fighting prowess is feared by thugs who flock Swiss bars and taverns.
- (Italy) Tony, an Italian-born and U.S.-based playboy with a twisted dark side to his life. He meditates for hours each day, summoning up the world's evil forces which, combined with his deadly martial arts ability, make him a fearsome opponent.
- (France) Luisa, a gym teacher who directs a class of fitness enthusiasts, reputed for her extreme degree of athleticism and seductive appearance.
- (United States) Macalosh, a spiritual leader of the Sioux. Found abandoned as a child by a wise chief, in his youth, he learned to fight with the various animals roaming Native American reserves.
- (United States) Ombra, an occultist who somehow originates from Pennsylvania and fights using his skills in alchemy rather than physical abilities, making him a calm, collected and intelligent fighter.
- (Germany) Keo, the custodian of an old castle who wears shoes with large springs, allowing him to jump higher and faster than his opponents. In addition to this signature "Spring Fighting" style, he can also transform into a tentacled "Moat Monster".
- (United Kingdom) Lola, a model and national karate champion who, aiming to be the very best in every trade, puts as much work into her fighting as her looks.

== Reception ==
The game was derided by critics. Stuart Campbell of Amiga Power gave it a rating of 3%, describing it as the worst game for the CD32 and one of the worst games ever. Amiga CD32 gamer gave the game a score of 2 out of 10, remarking that the "animation reveals the artist's complete lack of understanding human physiology and is painful to watch. There's also far too few frames of animation, movement is too fast and control is lousy. Whoever put this in the CD32 pack has a complete contempt for gamers, or is in the paid employ of Sega."

Among non-English reviewers, the French magazine Joystick unusually gave the game a more positive rating of 65%. The German magazine Amiga Joker gave the game a score of 20%, giving mixed reception to its graphics and sound but deriding its gameplay.

The Amiga CD32 version is included in Stuart Ashen's 2015 book Terrible Old Games You've Probably Never Heard Of, in which he remarks that Dangerous Streets looks "quite pretty" in screenshots, expressing that "characters are competently drawn and well-defined, and the backgrounds are colourful". He however expresses that this is no longer the case when the characters move, as Ashen calls Dangerous Streets' animation "beyond laughable", and speculates that this was "a marketing strategy to make magazine reviews and the back of the box more impressive". Ashen criticises Dangerous Streets' gameplay and controls, calling its fighting moves "an almost animation-free cavalcade of seemingly random, jerky attacks with no thought put into how they would affect the gameplay", and expresses that the controls "make no sense" and moving quickly is "a nightmare" due to the character's "bizarre" jump animations.
