= Power Drive (1994 video game) =

1994 video game

- European SNES box art
- Developer: Rage Software (Note: Ported to Amiga, Amiga CD32, and MS-DOS by Denton Designs.)
- Publishers: EU: U.S. Gold; BRA: Tectoy (SMD)
- Programmer: Tony Pomfret
- Artists: Andy Rixon; Paul Broadbent; Simon Street
- Composer: Kevin Bruce
- Platforms: Super NES, Amiga, CD32, MS-DOS, Mega Drive, Game Gear
- Release: November 1994: SNES; EU: November 1994 Amiga, CD32, DOS; EU: December 1994 Mega Drive; EU: December 1994; BRA: July 1997 Game Gear; EU: June 1995
- Genre: Racing
- Modes: Single-player, multiplayer

Power Drive is a 1994 racing video game developed by Rage Software and published by U.S. Gold. The player competes in rally driving in various countries.

== Gameplay ==
The Mini Cooper S (player) racing against the Fiat Cinquecento (CPU) in France (SNES version shown)

Power Drive is a racing game.

== Development ==
Power Drive was developed by Rage Software.

== Release ==
The Sega Mega Drive version was released exclusively on the Sega Channel for North America.

== Reception ==
Reception

Review scores
Publication	Score			
Publication	Amiga	DOS	Sega Genesis	SNES
Amiga Action	87%	N/A	N/A	N/A
Amiga Format	49%	N/A	N/A	N/A
Amiga Power	61%	N/A	N/A	N/A
Hyper	N/A	N/A	N/A	77/100
Joystick	N/A	80%	N/A	N/A
Mean Machines Sega	N/A	N/A	81/100	N/A
Official Nintendo Magazine	N/A	N/A	N/A	90/100
PC Games (DE)	N/A	47%	N/A	N/A
PC Zone	N/A	50/100	N/A	N/A
Super Play	N/A	N/A	N/A	69%
Total!	N/A	N/A	N/A	(UK) 80/100 (DE) 3-
CU Amiga	61%	N/A	N/A	N/A
Mega	N/A	N/A	83%	N/A
The One Amiga	71%	N/A	N/A	N/A
PC Player	N/A	67/100	N/A	N/A
PC Review	N/A	5/10	N/A	N/A
Sega Magazine	N/A	N/A	76/100	N/A
Sega Power	N/A	N/A	60%	N/A
Sega Pro	N/A	N/A	92%	N/A
Super Gamer	N/A	N/A	N/A	79/100

Power Drive garnered generally favorable reviews from critics.

The Amiga version received an average response from critics.

The MS-DOS version was met with mixed reception from the press.

The Sega Mega Drive version received a similar response to the original Super Nintendo Entertainment System release.

The Game Gear version earned average reviews.
