= Donk! The Samurai Duck! =

1994 video game

Donk! The Samurai Duck
- Developer: The Hidden
- Publisher: Supervision Entertainment
- Designer: Craig Howard
- Platforms: Amiga, Amiga CD32
- Release: 1994
- Genre: Platform
- Modes: Single-player, multiplayer

Donk! The Samurai Duck! is a 1994 platform game developed by The Hidden for the Amiga and Amiga CD32. Players control Donk, a duck raised by samurai warriors. The story follows Donk as he aims to foil his arch-enemy Eider Down's plans to find the magical gems deep inside another planet that protect Earth's atmosphere and hold the secret to samurai powers.

== Gameplay ==
Donk! The Samurai Duck! is a platform game where players control the titular protagonist Donk, who is tasked with defeating Eider Down and collecting different keys to reach his fortress. The game takes place from a side-scrolling perspective. Each level includes multiple exits, which are unlocked after the player collects a certain number of gems. Power-ups are scattered around each level, such as invincibility and the ability to float across water.

A multiplayer mode where two players play simultaneously via split-screen is also available.

== Plot ==
As a duckling, Donk is discovered on a river bank by Spidore, an elderly samurai warrior, who intends to cook and eat him. Before he is placed into the pot, Donk appeals to Spidore, who subsequently starts training him to become a samurai. By the time his training is complete, Spidore has lost much of his strength with age, and tasks Donk with completing his final quest. Eider Down aims to steal the magical gems hidden deep within another planet, which protect the Earth's atmosphere and hold the secret to samurai powers. Donk must thwart his plans before he can find them.

== Development ==
The game was originally titled Dong during development, but was later renamed to Donk due to "dong" being a slang term for the penis. The title still appears on cover disks included with some Amiga magazines.

== Legacy ==
In 2006, a Dreamcast version made by Cryptic Allusion was announced, with a release date later slated for late 2007. However, this version was never released.
