= Manchester United (video game series) =

Football video game series

Manchester United is a football video game series licensed by Manchester United, which was highly popular in the early 1990s.

== Games ==
Game series programmed by Krisalis ordered by release date:

- Manchester United (1990)
- Manchester United Europe (1991)
- Manchester United: Premier League Champions (1994)
- Manchester United Premier League Champions 1994-95 Season Data Disk (1994)
- Manchester United: The Double (1995)
- Manchester United Championship Soccer (1995)

Game series programmed by Codemasters, ordered by release date:

- Manchester United: Club Football (2003)
- Manchester United Manager 2005 (2004)
- Manchester United: Club Football 2005 (Manchester United Soccer in North America) (2004)
