= Oscar (video game) =

1993 video game

- Amiga cover art
- Developer: Flair Software
- Publishers: Flair Software; Titus (SNES)
- Designers: Philip Scott; Michael Hedley; Philip Nixon; Mark Sample
- Programmer: Michael Hedley
- Artists: Philip Nixon; Mark Sample
- Composer: Philip Nixon
- Platforms: Amiga, CD32, MS-DOS, Super NES
- Release: NA: 1993; EU: 1993; MS-DOS: NA: 1994; EU: 1994; SNES: NA: 1996; EU: 1996
- Genre: Platform
- Mode: Single-player

Oscar is a 1993 platform game developed and published by Flair Software for the Amiga, Amiga CD32, and MS-DOS. It was later released for the Super Nintendo Entertainment System in 1996. The CD32 version was bundled with the CD32 console on the same disc as the puzzle game Diggers. A Sega Genesis version planned but never released.

The player controls a character named Oscar through seven Hollywood-themed levels collecting Oscars.

== Reception ==
Reception

Review score
Publication	Score
Tilt	86%

In their April 1994 issue, Computer Gaming World said that the PC version of Oscar was "another very average platformy, arcadey, bounce-'em-around" with "confusing" graphics. The magazine predicted that it "will only appeal to total platform addicts who will likely find something better to waggle their joysticks at anyway".

== Legacy ==
Oscar was based on Flair’s Trolls game, featuring different levels and due to licensing issues, all Troll imagery was replaced with Flair's original creation Oscar.

A series of sequels were later released for the Nintendo DSi via DSiWare. In September 2009, the first sequel, Oscar in Toyland, was released and is themed around toys. The second sequel, titled Oscar in Movieland, was released in February 2010 and is themed around various movie genres. The third sequel, Oscar in Toyland 2, was released in 2011 and is a sequel to Oscar in Toyland. About 5 months later, the fourth and final sequel was released, Oscar's World Tour, and the theme is going around the world.
