= Diggers (video game) =

1993 video game

- Developer: Millennium Interactive
- Publisher: Millennium Interactive
- Designer: Toby Simpson
- Platforms: Amiga 1200, CD32, Acorn Archimedes, MS-DOS
- Release: EU: 1993; NA: 1994
- Genre: Puzzle
- Mode: Single-player

Diggers is a puzzle video game developed and published by Millennium Interactive for the Amiga CD32 in 1993 in Europe and 1994 in North America. The player takes control of a mining team excavating a planet for precious minerals.

It was later released for the Amiga 1200 and MS-DOS. Diggers was bundled with the CD32 at launch, along with the platform game Oscar on the same CD. A sequel, Extractors, was released for MS-DOS in 1995.

== Gameplay ==
The game is set on the planet Zarg, where four races are vying for the gems and ores buried there. The four races are: the Habbish, who dig quickly and have high endurance, yet are impatient and prone to wander off; Grablins, who dig the fastest, have good stamina but are weak fighters; Quarriors, who are slow diggers but strong fighters; and the F'Targs, who are mediocre but regain their health quickly. The player chooses one of the four races, then sends out five man teams to mine a region. There are 34 regions in all, with two accessible at the beginning of the game. Each region has an amount of money the player must amass in order to beat it and open up the adjacent territories. Time plays a role, as there is always a computer-controlled opposing race in the region, competing with the player to be the first to achieve the monetary goal.

The gameplay is similar in some ways to Lemmings, with the player issuing orders to his five miners, not directly controlling them. The stages themselves are viewed from the side - the mineshafts that extend throughout the levels give the impression of an anthill. The player commands his units to dig and, when needed, perform more specific actions such as picking up gems and fighting enemy diggers. The races have various personalities, and will occasionally do things without the player commanding them to; this can range from good (such as fighting an enemy) to very bad (walking into a deep pool of water and drowning). As the miners dig, rubies, gold, emeralds, and diamonds will appear.

At any time the player can teleport a miner back to the starting point and send him to the 'Zargon Stock Exchange', in order to trade the finds for money. Only three commodities are traded at one time, and the prices for each fluctuate depending on how much of a particular item has recently been sold. Here the player may also visit a shop and buy special mining tools, such as dynamite, automated drillers and bridge components. The miners themselves are expendable (though a monetary loss will be incurred for each lost worker), with a fresh set of five available each time a new level is entered.

== Reception ==
Reception

Review scores
| Publication | Score |
|---|---|
| Amiga Action | 91% |
| Next Generation | 3/5 |

Next Generation reviewed the PC version of the game, rating it three stars out of five, and stated that "Diggers has all the appeal of Lemmings with a good dose of exploration and greed thrown in to boot."

Amiga Action gave the game a score of 91% of 100 and stating that "A totally addictive and stunningly original masterpiece. Hardly the sort of game to show what the new CD32 is capable of, but a truly marvelous game in its own right. The only big drawback is the lack of a decent instruction manual to help you along at the beginning, but with a little effort, you 'll yourself totally absorbed in a puzzler to rival even the mighty Lemmings series. A game to grow old with.
