= Magic Island (video game) =

1995 video game

- Developer: Arda Team
- Publisher: Signum
- Release: 1995
- Genre: RPG

Magic Island is a 1995 Czech RPG video game developed by Arda Team and published by Signum for Amiga and Amiga CD32.
