= Flair Software =

British video game developer and publisher

Flair Software Ltd.
- Industry: Video games
- Founded: 5 June 1990; 36 years ago
- Headquarters: Newcastle upon Tyne, United Kingdom
- Key people: Colin Courtney
- Products: Elvira: The Arcade Game; Oscar; Dangerous Streets; Realm
- Brands: MicroValue; Virtual Playground; Casual Arts

Casual Arts, formerly known as Flair Software, is a British video game developer and publisher of the 1990s that developed and published games for the Amiga, CD32, Atari ST, Commodore 64, MS-DOS, PlayStation, Saturn, and Super NES. It was founded by Colin Courtney in 1990 after his previous company, Tynesoft, went bankrupt. It retained Tynesoft's MicroValue brand and published Elvira: The Arcade Game which had originally been scheduled for publication by Tynesoft.

The company is mainly associated with and colorful Amiga games such as Trolls, Oscar, and Whizz. In 1993, platformer Oscar was bundled with Millennium's Diggers as a launch bundle for the Amiga CD32 and it was considered one of the mascot games for the system. Flair Software's 1994 fighting game Dangerous Streets (that was a pack-in game for the CD32 later in its lifespan) is generally considered one of the worst games of all time.

The games Trolls and Oscar were remade and re-released in 2010 as Nintendo DSiWare by Virtual Playground (part of the MicroValue group of companies) under the new titles Oscar in Toyland (since the Trolls license couldn't be used anymore) and Oscar in Movieland. In 2011 Virtual Playground also released two new original Oscar games (Oscar in Toyland 2 and Oscar's World Tour) for DSiWare.

The company currently operates under the name Casual Arts and releases games for Windows, Mac, Nintendo DS/3DS, iOS, Android, and Kindle.

== Selected games ==
- Turn n' Burn (1990, Amiga, Atari ST, Commodore 64, MS-DOS)
- Elvira: Mistress of the Dark (1991, Commodore 64) (publisher)
- Elvira: The Arcade Game (1991, Amiga, Atari ST, Commodore 64, MS-DOS)
- Euro Soccer (1992, Amiga, MS-DOS)
- Trolls (1992, Amiga, CD32, Commodore 64, MS-DOS)
- Oscar (1993, Amiga, CD32, MS-DOS, SNES)
- Surf Ninjas (1993, CD32)
- Dangerous Streets (1994, Amiga, CD32, MS-DOS)
- Summer Olympix (1994, CD32)
- Whizz (1994, Amiga, MS-DOS, PlayStation, Saturn, SNES)
- Rally Championships (1994, Amiga, MS-DOS)
- Soccer Superstars (1995, Amiga, CD32, MS-DOS)
- Realm (1996, SNES)
- Time Paradox (1996, MS-DOS)
- MegaMorph (1997, MS-DOS)
- Double Agent (1998, Windows, Amiga)
- Jungle Legend (1999, Windows)
