= Amiga CD32 =

1993 video game console

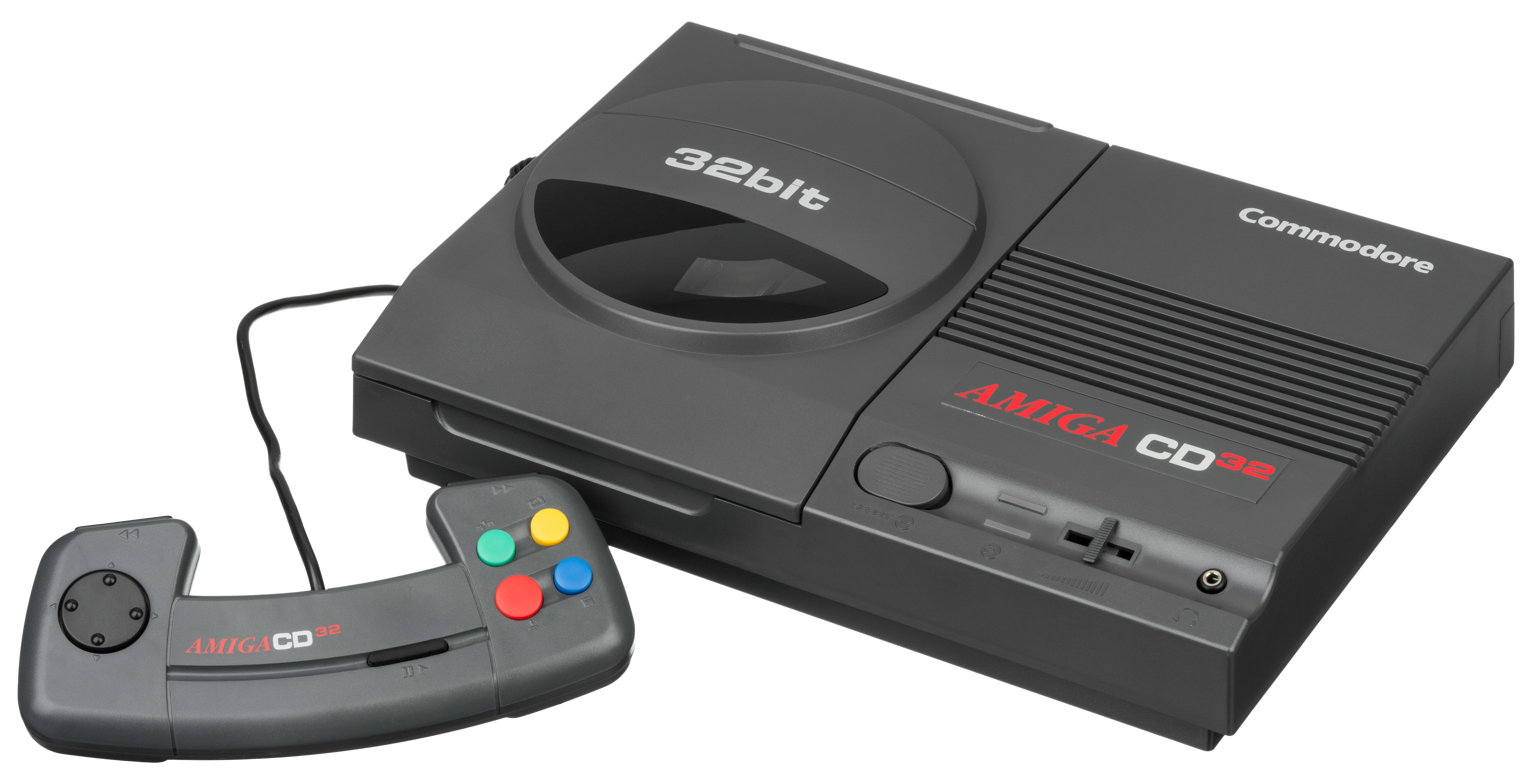
- Amiga CD32 console with controller
- Also known as: Spellbound (codename)
- Manufacturer: Commodore International
- Product family: Amiga
- Type: Home video game console Gaming computer
- Generation: Fifth generation era
- Released: September 17, 1993
- Lifespan: 1993–1994
- Discontinued: April 29, 1994
- Units sold: Approximately 25,000 in Germany and 100,000 in Europe.
- Media: CD-ROM
- Operating system: AmigaOS 3.1
- CPU: Motorola 68EC020 @ 14.18 MHz (PAL), 14.32 MHz (NTSC)
- Memory: 2 MB Chip RAM
- Storage: 1 KB EEPROM
- Display: RF modulator (RCA); Composite video (RCA); S-Video; 320×200 to 1280×400 (NTSC), 320×256 to 1280×512 (PAL); 256 colors in indexed mode, 262,144 colors in HAM-8 mode
- Graphics: AGA, Akiko
- Sound: 4 × 8-bit PCM channels; Stereo audio (RCA); 28 kHz sampling rate
- Controller input: Gamepad, mouse
- Backward compatibility: Commodore CDTV
- Predecessor: Commodore CDTV

The Amiga CD32 is a home video game console developed by Commodore as part of the Amiga line, as well as the final hardware to be developed by the company. Released in September 1993 in Europe, Australia, Canada, and Brazil, it was marketed as the "first" 32-bit games console and is essentially a keyboard-less Amiga 1200 personal computer without the I/O ports, but with the addition of a CD-ROM drive in place of floppy and a modified Advanced Graphics Architecture chipset for improved graphical performance.

Unlike Commodore's CDTV released two years prior, the CD32 was designed specifically as a games machine. The majority of CD32 game software were ports of existing Amiga 1200 or Amiga 500 titles, and many did not take advantage of CD capabilities like CD music or full-motion video. While its sales in European markets were average, the console was withdrawn from sale after only a short time as Commodore filed for bankruptcy in April 1994.

== History ==
Codenamed "Spellbound", Commodore first announced the Amiga CD32 at the Science Museum in London on July 16, 1993 amid great fanfare from the British media. Despite the healthy popularity of Amiga in Europe as of 1992, Commodore's financial situation was dire, and the Amiga CD32 was the important product to turn around its fortunes. In the Christmas period following its launch, the CD32 accounted for 38% of all CD-ROM drive sales in Britain, exceeding sales of the Mega-CD. Ultimately during the brief Amiga CD32 presence in the market, approximately 25,000 units were sold in Germany, and around 100,000 units were sold in Europe.

Commodore demonstrated the system at the World of Commodore Amiga show in Pasadena in September 1993, promising to sell the console in some American cities by Christmas with wider distribution in January 1994 for US$399 (equivalent to $889.27 in 2025). Computer Gaming World reported in November 1993 that "a significant amount of software will be available immediately" for the console, based on the Amiga 1200. The CD32 was released in Canada and Australia, and Commodore stated that the console would launch in the United States in either late February or early March 1994, at the price of $399 with two pack-in games, Pinball Fantasies and Sleepwalker, and six separately sold launch games. However, a deadline was reached for Commodore to pay 10 million USD in patent royalty to Cad Track (U.S. patent 4,197,590) for its use of its XOR patent. A federal judge ordered an injunction against Commodore preventing it from importing anything into the United States. Commodore had built up CD32 inventory in its Philippine manufacturing facility for the United States launch, but, being unable to sell the consoles, they remained in the Philippines until the debts owed to the owners of the facility were settled. Commodore declared bankruptcy shortly afterward, and the CD32 was never officially sold in the United States. However, imported models came over the border from Canada, and many stores in the United States (primarily mail-order stores) imported units for domestic sale. During the long bankruptcy proceedings, Commodore UK also provided some hardware components and software for the American market, including production of the MPEG Video Module, which was not officially released by Commodore International.

Ultimately, Commodore was not able to meet demand for new units because of component supply problems. Sales of the CD32 in Europe were not enough to save Commodore, and the bankruptcy of Commodore International in April 1994 caused the CD32 to be discontinued only eight months after its debut.

== Hardware ==
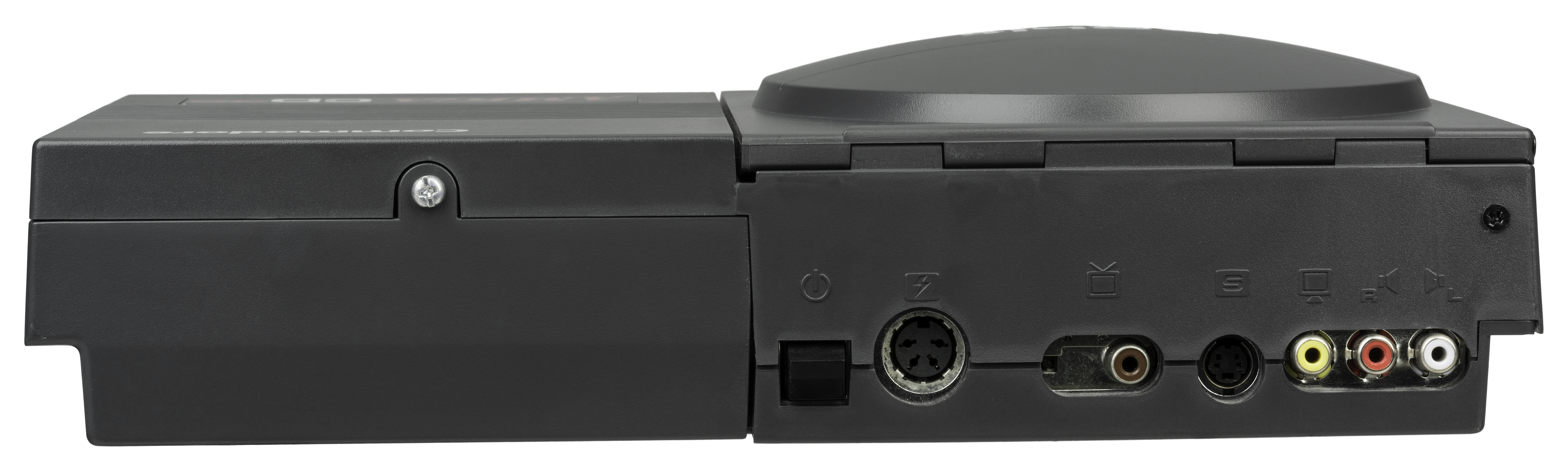
Back of CD32

The CD32 was marketed on its box as "The World's First 32-bit CD Games Console". Although it is the first such machine released in Europe and North America, it was beaten to market by seven months by the FM Towns Marty, a console released exclusively in Japan. However, the CD32's 68EC020 processor has a 32-bit data bus both internally and externally, while the 386SX in the FM Towns Marty has a 16-bit data bus externally. However, because the CD32 shipped with 2MB of RAM shared between the chipset and the CPU, this means the CPU is bottlenecked when accessing memory, similar to an Amiga 1200 operating without 32-bit "fast" (CPU dedicated) RAM.

=== Accessories ===
Commodore's MPEG decompression module for the CD32 provides support for playing Video CD and CD+G releases, attaching to the rear of the console and augmenting it with an MPEG decoder chipset from C-Cube together with 1.5 MB of video RAM. The unit, demonstrated at the 1994 CeBIT show, was priced at around £200.

The CD32 can be enhanced using these devices:

ProModule, Paravision SX-1, DCE SX-32 (which optionally includes 68030 CPU) and Terrible Fire's TF328, TF330, and TF360 (which add 2.5" IDE, keyboard connector and 8Mb/64mb of Fastmem).

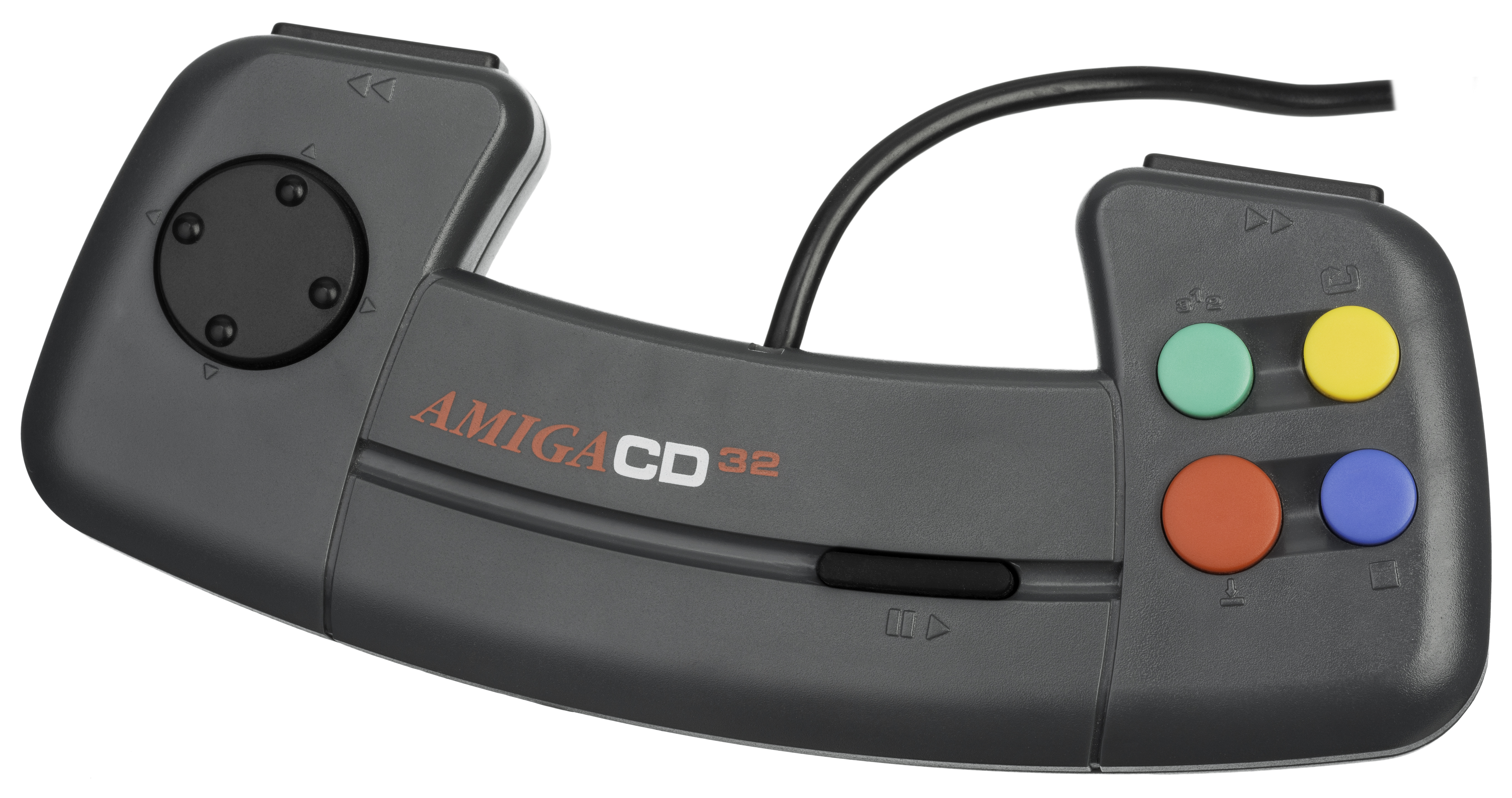
The CD32's controller

Those devices extend the capabilities of the Amiga CD32, allowing it to utilize hardware such as an external 3.5" floppy disk drive, hard disk and IBM PC keyboard (a CD32-branded keyboard was officially released however, which used the AUX port on the left of the machine). An Amiga CD32 can be turned into a de facto Amiga 1200 via the addition of third-party packages. The SX-1 appears to have been designed around Commodore's mechanical specs and not the actual production units – it did not fit very well and requires an internal "modification" to equip it properly. Consequently, the SX-1 can be jarred loose if the console is not handled gently. The upgraded SX-32 expansion pack (which included a 68030 25 MHz processor) solves these problems.

Not wishing to repeat its earlier mistake of offering a way to turn a CD32 into an enhanced A1200 as it did with the A500-based CDTV, Commodore itself made no hardware available for that purpose. One of its last hardware designs, however, was an external CD-ROM drive for the A1200 that featured the CD32's Akiko chip, thus turning any A1200 into a CD32-compatible system. The only currently known surviving prototype of the CD1200 drive resides at the Retro Computer Museum in Leicester.

In addition to its own special controllers, the Amiga CD32 is compatible with most controllers designed for the Atari joystick port from the 1980s and 1990s, as well as Amiga mice and paddles.

CDs created for the CD32 conform to ISO 9660 level2 mode1, although the Rock Ridge and Joliet extensions are not compatible.

== Software ==
If the system is turned on without a CD, a splash screen with scrolling colors will appear and a tune will play. After this tune ends, the user can press the blue button on the game pad to enter a language selection menu. The user can also press the red button to access a menu where they can view the contents of the internal Flash ROM. Unlike most game consoles, this menu does not allow the user to delete items. Instead, the system will automatically overwrite the oldest entries when the memory runs out. The menu does, however, allow the user to "lock" files to prevent overwriting.

The CD32 launch bundle includes two games: Diggers, a new game from Millennium Interactive, and Oscar from Flair Software. A later pack includes the one-on-one fighting game Dangerous Streets, a move by Commodore that was met with derision by the press. Many reviewers had given Dangerous Streets terrible scores (Amiga Power rating it just 3%) and were surprised that with a slew of powerful rival consoles about to hit the market, Commodore would choose to show off the abilities of its machine with a poor game.

The CD32 is capable of running most of the releases for the Amiga CDTV multimedia device, but differences in CPU speed and Kickstart version prevent some of the earlier CDTV releases from running. Most of the games released for the CD32 are simply ports of games that were already available for Amiga computers. One benefit of this is that, when appropriate, many games retain the ability to use an Amiga mouse (in port 2) or Amiga keyboard (plugged into the AUX port).

Like all later Amiga computers, the CD32 has a hidden boot menu that can be accessed by plugging an Amiga mouse into port 2 and holding both buttons down while turning the system on. Most of the options in this menu are not useful on a CD32, but from this menu the user can choose to boot in either NTSC or PAL mode. This is important, as there are some games that will not work if the system is in the wrong mode, and most games don't advertise what video mode they were developed for. Despite the naming, the menu really only allows a choice of 60 Hz or 50 Hz video output; a PAL system booted in NTSC mode will still output a video signal using PAL color encoding, which will usually result in a black-and-white picture when connected to an NTSC television.

== Specifications ==
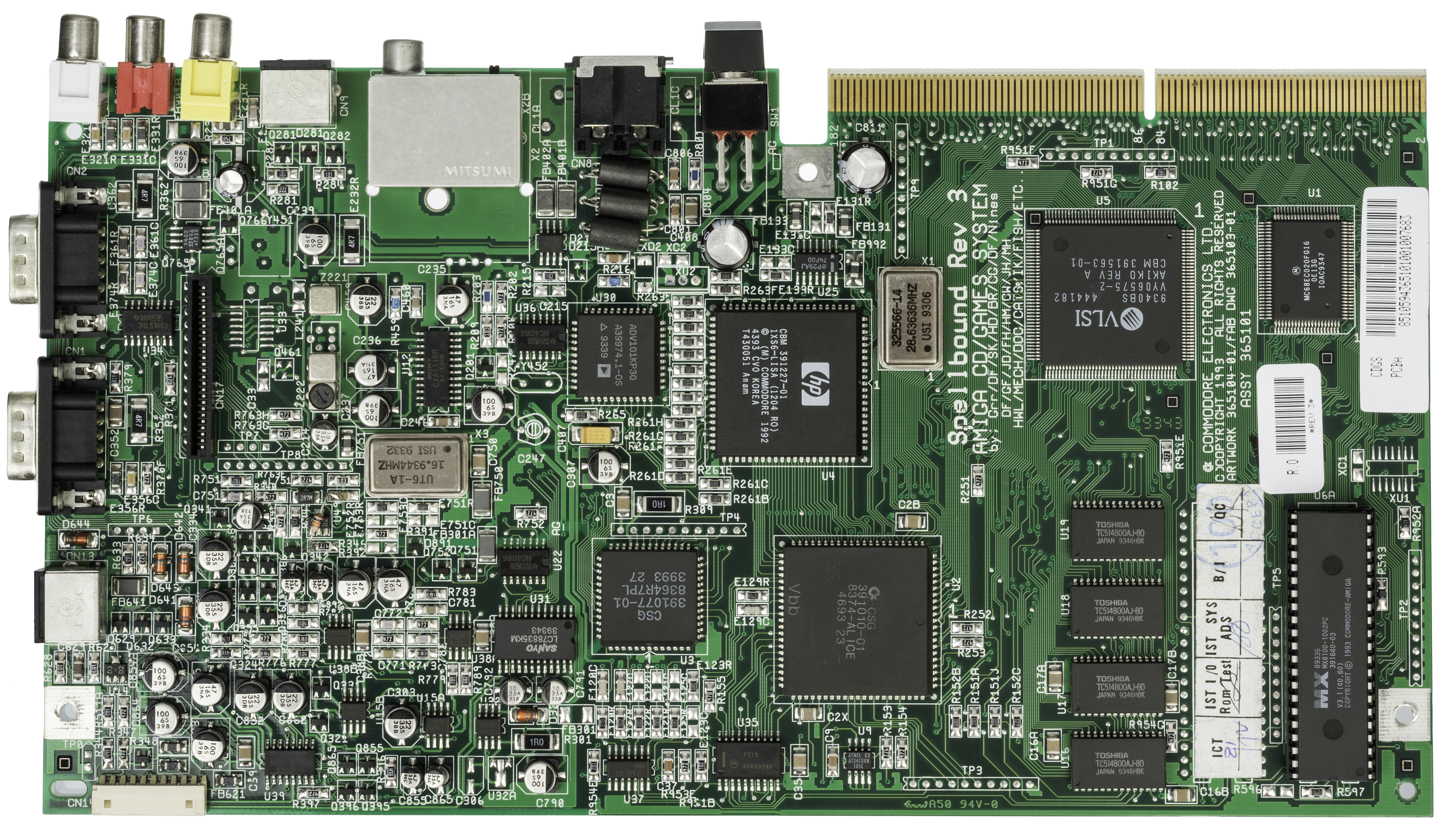
Amiga CD32 Mainboard

Attribute	Specification
Processor	Motorola 68EC020 at 14.32 MHz (NTSC) or 14.18 MHz (PAL)
RAM	2 MB Amiga Chip RAM
ROM	1 MB Kickstart ROM with CD32 firmware 1 KB non-volatile EEPROM memory for game saves
Chipset	Advanced Graphics Architecture (AGA) Additional Akiko chip (CD-ROM controller and performs chunky to planar graphics conversion)
Video	24-bit color palette (16.8 million colors) Up to 256 on-screen colours in indexed mode 262 144 on-screen colors in HAM-8 mode Resolutions from: 320×200 to 1280×400i (NTSC); 320×256 to 1280×512i (PAL)
Audio	4 × 8-bit PCM channels (2 stereo channels) 28 kHz maximum DMA sampling rate
Removable storage	Double-speed (300 KB/s) CD-ROM drive (proprietary MKE controller)
Input/Output ports	Front: Headphone jack 3.5 mm TRS stereo jack with volume control; Left: 2 × Mouse/Gamepad ports (DE9M); RS-232 serial AUX port and for keyboard etc. (6-pin mini-DIN); Back: Expansion slot behind a plate; Power switch; Power input for +5V DC 2.2A and +12V DC 500mA (4-pin DIN); RF audio/video out (RCA) and channel adjust; S-Video out (4-pin mini-DIN) However French versions had 8-pin Mini-DIN instead with RGB signals.; Composite video out (RCA); Audio out Left & Right (2 × RCA)
Expansion slots	182-pin expansion socket for official MPEG decoder cartridge or third party devices such as the SX-1 and SX32 expansion packs
Operating system	AmigaOS 3.1 (Kickstart 3.1 and CD32 firmware)

== Reception ==
Computer Gaming World magazine in January 1994 stated that "in spite of Commodore's earlier efforts to disguise the fact—the Amiga is a great gaming platform", but wondered if the company could successfully market the console in the US; "The CDTV fiasco certainly isn't reassuring. Will there be enough U.S. developers to make the investment worthwhile?"

Several magazines were launched that were dedicated to the CD32. In particular, Paragon Publishing released Amiga CD32 Gamer, which lasted 21 issues until February 1996.

== Deployments ==
In 1993, 109 CD32 units were installed to run the interactive exhibits at the London Transport Museum, Covent Garden. They provided information, animations, pictures, sound, and text available in several languages, and a London Underground simulator. The systems were produced by the Odiham, Hampshire-based company Index Information, using their CD32x interface units.

In 1995, an Italian company named CD Express used the CD32 as a basis for an arcade machine called CUBO CD32. Inside these machines, stock CD32s were hooked up to an external circuit board which essentially acted as a converter to route all the input and output into a standard JAMMA connector for use in an arcade cabinet. The software was provided on CD-ROM. Nine games are known to exist, all of which are original games created by CD Express.

In the mid to late 1990s, some vehicle registries in Canada used CD32 systems for interactive multimedia testing for drivers license applications.

In the late 1990s to early 2000s, slot machine manufacturer StarGames used a stripped down CD32 motherboard in many of its slot machines. Machines confirmed to be operating on CD32 hardware are Hawaiian Delight, Leprechaun Luck, and Mister Magic.

From 1994 to 1997, Wall Street Institute used CD32 systems at its learning centers. Main features include software with voice tone recognition and interactive activities very focused on listening. Those consoles have a floppy disk drive unit attached, with a clock unit, for saving students' progress and sharing them with teachers. Data was stored in a central database and the system offered an advanced multimedia environment with statistics. It was replaced with PC systems after some years of intensive use and a very strong stock of spare consoles and pieces.

In 1995, Taurus Ventures Inc in Burnaby, BC developed the VanCity Direct TV system based on the CD32 for the VanCity Credit Union. It features a custom modem, also designed by TVi.

== See also ==
- Commodore CDTV
- Commodore 64 Games System
- Amiga models and variants
