= List of Amiga games (I–O) =

This is a list of games for the Amiga computer, organised alphabetically by name. See Lists of video games for related lists.

== I ==
- I Ludicrus
- Iceball
- Icerunner
- Ikari Warriors
- Ilyad
- Immortal, The
- Impact
- Imperator: Master Of Rome
- Imperium
- Impossamole
- Impossible Mission II
- Impossible Mission 2025
- Incredible Crash Dummies, The
- Incredible Shrinking Sphere
- Indiana Jones and the Fate of Atlantis
- Indiana Jones and the Last Crusade: The Action Game
- Indiana Jones and the Last Crusade: The Graphic Adventure
- Indianapolis 500: The Simulation
- Indian Mission
- Indoor Sports
- Industrial Rebound
- Indy Heat
- Inferior
- Infestation
- Infidel
- Ingrid's Back
- Innocent Until Caught
- Insanity Fight
- Insects in Space
- Intact
- International 3D Tennis
- International Karate
- International Karate +
- International Rugby Challenge
- International Soccer
- International Soccer Challenge
- International Truck Racing
- Interphase
- Into the Eagle's Nest
- Invasion
- Invest
- Iron Lord
- Ishar
- Ishar 2
- Ishar 3
- Ishido: The Way of Stones
- Island of Lost Hope, The
- It Came from the Desert
- Italy '90 Soccer
- Ivanhoe

== J ==
- J.R.R. Tolkien's The Lord of the Rings, Vol. I
- Jack Nicklaus' Greatest 18 Holes of Major Championship Golf
- Jaguar XJ220
- Jaktar: Der Elfenstein
- James Clavell's Shōgun
- James Pond
- James Pond 2
- James Pond 3: Operation Starfish
- Japanese, British & German Forces
- Jaws
- Jeanne d'Arc
- Jet
- Jet Pilot
- Jet Set Willy II
- Jetsons, The
- Jetstrike
- Jim Power in Mutant Planet
- Jimmy Connors Pro Tennis Tour
- Jimmy White's 'Whirlwind' Snooker
- Jimmy's Fantastic Journey
- Jinks
- Jinxter
- Joan of Arc: Siege and the Sword
- Joe & Mac
- Joe Blade
- Joe Blade 2
- John Barnes European Football
- John Madden Football
- Journey
- Judge Dredd
- JUG
- Jumping Jack Son
- Jungle Book, The
- Jungle Strike
- Jurassic Park
- Jurajski Sen

== K ==
- K240
- Kaiser
- Kalashnikov
- Kamikaze
- The Karate Kid Part II: The Computer Game
- Karate King
- Karate Master
- Kargon
- Karting Grand Prix
- Kampfgruppe
- Kang Fu
- KAPITAlist
- Katakis
- Kayden Garth
- Keef the Thief
- Kellogg's Game
- Kelly X
- Kengi
- Kengilon
- Kennedy Approach
- Kenny Dalglish Soccer Match
- Keys to Maramon
- KGB
- Khalaan
- Kick Off
- Kick Off 2
- Kick Off 2 competition version
- KickIt: A Day for the Laiban
- Kid Chaos
- Kid Gloves
- Kid Gloves 2
- Kikstart II
- Kikugi
- Killerball
- Killing Cloud
- Killing Game Show, The
- Killing Machine
- King of Chicago, The
- Kingdoms of England II: Vikings, Fields of Conquest
- Kingdoms of Germany
- Kingmaker
- King's Bounty
- King's Quest: Quest for the Crown
- King's Quest II: Romancing the Throne
- King's Quest III: To Heir Is Human
- King's Quest IV: The Perils of Rosella
- King's Quest V: Absence Makes the Heart Go Yonder!
- King's Quest VI: Heir Today, Gone Tomorrow
- Kiro's Quest
- Klax
- Knight Force
- Knightmare (1987 video game)
- Knightmare (1991 video game)
- Knight Orc
- Knights
- Knights and Merchants
- Knights of the Crystallion
- Knights of the Sky
- Knoorkie the Pig
- Kosmos
- Kristal, The
- Krusty's Fun House
- Krypton Egg
- Kult
- Kwik Snax

== L ==
- Labyrinth of Time, The
- Lamborghini
- Lamborghini American Challenge
- Lancaster
- Lancelot
- Land of Genesis
- Larrie and the Ardies
- Larrie at the Castle
- Laser Squad
- Last Action Hero
- Last Battle
- Last Inca, The
- Last Ninja, The
- Last Ninja 2
- Last Ninja 3
- Last Soldier, The
- Leaderboard
- Leading Lap
- Leander
- Leather Goddesses of Phobos
- Leavin' Teramis
- LED Storm
- Legend
- Legend of Djel
- Legend of Faerghail
- Legend of Kyrandia, The
- Legend of Lothian
- Legend of Rome
- Legend of the Lost
- Legend of the Sword
- Legends of Valour
- Legion
- Legion of Dawn
- Leisure Suit Larry in the Land of the Lounge Lizards
- Leisure Suit Larry Goes Looking for Love (in Several Wrong Places)
- Leisure Suit Larry III: Passionate Patti in Pursuit of the Pulsating Pectorals
- Leisure Suit Larry 5: Passionate Patti Does a Little Undercover Work
- Lemmings
- Lemmings 2: The Tribes
- Les Manley in: Search for the King
- Lethal Action
- Lethal Weapon
- Lethal Xcess
- Leviathan
- Liberation: Captive 2
- Life & Death
- Light Corridor, The
- Limes & Napoleon
- Line of Fire
- Links
- Lionheart
- Lion King, The
- Litil Divil
- Little Computer People
- Little Dragon
- Little Puff in Dragonland
- Liverpool
- Livingstone
- Livingstone 2
- Llamatron
- Logic
- Logical
- Logo
- Lollypop
- Lombard RAC Rally
- Loopz
- Loom
- Lords of Chaos
- Lords of Doom
- Lords of the Realm
- Lords of the Rising Sun
- Lords of Time
- Lorna
- Lost Dutchman Mine
- Lost New York
- Lost Patrol
- Lost Vikings, The
- Lost'n'Maze
- Lothar Matthäus Soccer
- Lotus Esprit Turbo Challenge
- Lotus Turbo Challenge 2
- Lotus 3: The Ultimate Challenge
- Lupo Alberto
- Lure of the Temptress
- Lurking Horror, The

== M ==
- M.C. Kids
- M1 Tank Platoon
- Mad News
- Mad Professor Mariarti
- Mad TV
- Maelstrom
- Mafdet
- Mag!
- Magic Ball
- Magic Boy
- Magic Fly
- Magic Island
- Magic Lines
- Magic Marble
- Magic Pockets
- Magic Serpent
- Magicland Dizzy
- Major Motion
- Manager, The
- Manchester United
- Manchester United 2
- Manchester United 3
- Manhunter: New York
- Manhunter 2: San Francisco
- Maniac Mansion
- Manic Miner
- Manix
- Marble Madness
- Marblelous
- Marblelous 2
- Marvin's Marvellous Adventures
- Master Axe
- Master Ninja
- Masterblazer
- Matrix Marauders
- Maupiti Island
- MAX Rally
- Mean 18
- Mean Arenas
- MechCombat
- MechForce
- Medieval Warriors
- Mega Motion
- Mega Phoenix
- Mega Twins
- Mega Typhoon
- Mega-Lo-Mania
- Megaball
- Megaball 4
- Megafortress
- MegaTraveller 1: The Zhodani Conspiracy
- MegaTraveller 2: Quest for the Ancients
- Menace
- Mentor
- Mercenary
- Mercenary III
- Merchant Colony
- Metal Law
- Metal Masters
- Metal Mutant
- Michael Jackson's Moonwalker
- Mickey Mouse
- Micro Machines
- Microcosm
- MicroProse Golf
- MicroProse Soccer
- Midnight Resistance
- Midwinter
- Midwinter II: Flames of Freedom
- Miecze Valdgira II: Władca Gór
- Mig 29 Soviet Fighter
- MIG-29M Super Fulcrum
- Might and Magic II: Gates to Another World
- Might and Magic III: Isles of Terra
- Mighty Bomb Jack
- Mike the Magic Dragon
- Millennium 2.2
- Mindfighter
- Mind Force
- Mind Forever Voyaging, A
- Mind Run
- Mind Walker
- Mindroll
- Mindshadow
- Minos
- Missiles over Xerion
- Mission Elevator
- Mobile Warfare
- Moebius: The Orb of Celestial Harmony
- Monkey Island 2: LeChuck's Revenge
- Monopoly
- Monster Business
- Monsters of Terror
- Monty Python's Flying Circus
- Moon City
- Moonbase
- Moonblaster
- Moonfall
- Moonmist
- Moonshine Racers
- Moonstone: A Hard Days Knight
- Morph
- Mortal Kombat
- Mortal Kombat II
- Mortville Manor (Le Manoir de Mortevielle)
- Mot
- Motorbike Madness
- Motorhead
- Mr. Blobby
- Mr. Do! Run Run!
- Mr. Heli
- Mr. Nutz: Hoppin' Mad
- Munsters, The
- Murder!
- Myst
- Mystical
- Myth

== N ==
- 'Nam: 1965-1975
- Napalm: The Crimson Crisis
- Napoleon
- Napoleon vs. The Evil Monarchies: The Battle of Austerlitz
- NARC
- National Hunt
- Naughty Ones
- Navy Moves
- Navy Seals
- Nebulus
- Nebulus 2
- Necronom
- Neighbours
- Nemac IV
- Netherworld
- Neuromancer
- Never Mind
- New York Warriors
- New Zealand Story
- Nexuiz
- Nick Faldo's Championship Golf
- Nicky
- Nicky 2
- Nigel Mansell's Grand Prix
- Nigel Mansell's World Championship
- Night Hunter
- Night Shift
- Nightbreed: The Action Game
- Nightlong: Union City Conspiracy
- Ninja
- Ninja Mission
- Ninja Rabbits
- Ninja Remix
- Ninja Spirit
- Nippon Safes Inc.
- Nitro
- No Buddies Land
- No Excuses
- No Exit
- No Greater Glory
- No Second Prize
- Nobunaga's Ambition
- Nord and Bert Couldn't Make Head or Tail of It
- North & South
- Nova 9: The Return of Gir Draxon
- Nuclear War
- Nuxelia
- NY Warriors

== O ==
- Oath, The
- Obitus
- Obliterator
- Obsession
- Odyssey
- Ogre
- Oh No! More Lemmings
- OloFight
- OM Super Football
- Omega
- Omni-Play Horse Racing
- Omnicron Conspiracy
- OnEscapee
- On the Road
- One on One: Dr. J vs. Larry Bird
- One Step Beyond
- Onslaught
- Ooops Up!
- Operation Com.Bat
- Operation Neptun
- Operation Harrier
- Operation Stealth
- Operation Thunderbolt
- Operation Wolf
- Orbit 2000
- Oriental Games
- Ork
- Oscar
- Osiris
- OsWALD
- Out to Lunch
- Out Run
- Out Run Europa
- Outlands
- Outzone
- Overdrive
- Overlord
- Overkill & Lunar-C
- Overlander
- Oxxonian
- Oxyd
