= Bill Williams (game designer) =

American video game designer (1960–1998)

- Born: May 29, 1960; Pontiac, Michigan
- Died: May 28, 1998 (aged 37); Rockport, Texas
- Occupations: Video game designer, programmer, composer Author
- Years active: 1982–1998
- Known for: Necromancer; Alley Cat; Mind Walker; Pioneer Plague; Knights of the Crystallion
- Spouse: Martha S. Williams

Bill Williams (May 29, 1960 – May 28, 1998) was an American video game designer, programmer, composer, and author born with cystic fibrosis, a genetic disorder. According to a medical encyclopedia Williams consulted when he was 12, people with cystic fibrosis weren't expected to live past the age of 13.

Williams created a string of computer games from 1982 through 1990 for the Atari 8-bit computers and then the Amiga which are admired for their imaginative design concepts, innovative sound and music, and skillful implementation. Necromancer is a three-stage game about a wizard growing and controlling an army of trees. Scenarios in Alley Cat include stealthily drinking from the bowls of sleeping dogs, avoiding a sweeping broom to jump inside a fish bowl, and collecting ferns atop a bookcase protected by spiders. Mind Walker, one of the first games released for the Amiga, puts the player inside the head of a physics professor gone mad.

Late in his career he worked on a licensed game for the Nintendo Entertainment System and another for the Super NES, but became frustrated with the game business and left to attend the Lutheran School of Theology at Chicago and write two theological works.

Williams died from cystic fibrosis in 1998, at the age of 37.

== Game design ==
Bill Williams's first published game was the vertically scrolling Salmon Run for the Atari 8-bit computers, published by the Atari Program Exchange in 1982. The player controls a salmon traveling upriver to mate while jumping waterfalls and avoiding bears and other obstacles.

He then wrote two games for Synapse Software: Necromancer (1982) and Alley Cat (1983). Alley Cat was begun by another programmer, John Harris, who abandoned the project. Each game is a collection of smaller games. Necromancer begins with a wizard growing and protecting trees, then, in the next stage, using those trees to crush spider eggs in stone vaults. Alley Cat takes place behind an urban apartment building and jumping through an open window starts one of six surreal minigames.

Synapse ported Salmon Run to the VIC-20, publishing it in 1983 under the label Showcase Software. In 1984, Synapse published the stress reduction package Relax, combining a sensor headband and minigames providing biofeedback. The software was a collaboration between Williams and fellow Synapse game designer Kelly Jones (who wrote the 1983 Atari 8-bit game Drelbs).

Williams then moved to the Amiga, designing and programming Mind Walker. It was published by Commodore in 1986 as one of the earliest releases for the new computer. He followed that game with Sinbad and the Throne of the Falcon (1987), and Pioneer Plague (1988). Pioneer Plague was the first Amiga game to make full use of the difficult to work with Hold-And-Modify mode for the in-game graphics. His final game for the platform was Knights of the Crystallion (1990):

Knights was the game I threw the most of my soul into, out of all the games I ever did. Knights was my attempt to draw the industry into a different direction. It was going to be my epic, it was going to be my masterpiece—we called it a cultural simulation—and I thought I could pull it off.

For almost all of these Atari 8-bit and Amiga titles, Williams did the design and programming, created the art and sound effects, and composed the music. The credits often read, simply, "by Bill Williams."

Near the end of his game development career, he worked on Monopoly for the Nintendo Entertainment System and Bart's Nightmare for Super NES. Both games were for Sculptured Software in Salt Lake City, Utah, though Williams worked out of his home. Company meddling during the development of the last game prompted Williams to abandon the video game industry completely, calling the experience "Bill's Nightmare". Some Super Nintendo sound driver code written by Williams during this time was used in other games.

== Writing ==
Williams wrote the book Naked Before God: The Return of a Broken Disciple, published by Morehouse Publishing in May 1998 and in paperback in 2001. It imagines himself as a disciple of Jesus with cystic fibrosis in the present day, trying to understand his struggles with CF and diabetes, and Jesus's message. A collection of poetry and short prose, Manna in the Wilderness: A Harvest of Hope, illustrated by his wife Martha Williams, was published posthumously in March 1999.

== Death ==
Bill had been born with the genetic disorder cystic fibrosis, which affected his lungs and impaired his ability to breathe. In 1992, he moved to Chicago to study at the Lutheran School of Theology at Chicago, but the city's air pollution worsened his condition significantly, and he had to drop out after two years with only half of the program completed. He moved to Rockport, Texas, but his health continued to deteriorate until he died of complications from the disorder on May 28, 1998, one day before his 38th birthday.
