= Hammerin' Hank =

Hammerin' Hank, Hammerin Hank or Hammering Hank is a nickname, primarily appearing in American sports, which may refer to:

- Hank Aaron (1934–2021), American baseball player (primarily with the Milwaukee / Atlanta Braves) and inductee to the National Baseball Hall of Fame
- Henry Armstrong (1912–1988), American boxer and world boxing champion
- Henry T. Elrod (1905–1941), American aviator in the United States Marine Corps
- Hank Greenberg (1911–1986), American baseball player (primarily with the Detroit Tigers) and inductee to the National Baseball Hall of Fame
- Henry Milligan (born 1958), American boxer
- Hank Nichols (born 1936), American college basketball referee
- Henry Slomanski (1928–2000), American karate champion
- Henry Wajda (1934–1973), American horse racing jockey

== See also ==
- Hammerin' Harmon, nickname of American baseball player Harmon Killebrew
- Hammerin' Harry, a series of Japanese video games
  - Hammerin' Hero, a 2008 Japanese video game
- Hammering Man, a series of sculptures by Jonathan Borofsky
