= MiG-29 (disambiguation) =

MiG-29 may refer to

- Mikoyan MiG-29, a Soviet-Russian fighter aircraft
- Mig 29 Soviet Fighter, 1989 game by Codemasters
- MiG-29 Fulcrum (1990 video game), 1990 combat flight simulation by Domark
- MiG-29 Fulcrum (1998 video game), 1998 combat flight simulation by Novalogic
