= List of Amiga games =

This is a list of games for the Amiga line of personal computers organised alphabetically by name. See Lists of video games for related lists.

This list has been split into multiple pages. It contains 2,235 games. Please use the Table of Contents to browse it.

List of Amiga games A to H

List of Amiga games I to O

List of Amiga games P to Z

== Sources ==
- Hall Of Light
- Lemon Amiga
- Amiga games at MobyGames
