= Drelbs =

1983 video game

- UK box cover
- Developer: Synapse Software
- Publishers: Synapse Software; U.S. Gold (UK)
- Designer: Kelly Jones
- Programmers: Atari 8-bit Kelly Jones; Apple II; Jonathan Tifft; Commodore 64; Miriam Nathan; William Mandel
- Platforms: Apple II, Atari 8-bit, Commodore 64
- Release: 1983: Atari, Apple; 1984: C64
- Genre: Maze
- Mode: Single-player

Drelbs is a maze video game written by Kelly Jones for Atari 8-bit computers and published by Synapse Software in 1983. An Apple II port by Jonathan Tifft was released the same year. A Commodore 64 version followed in 1984 implemented by Miriam Nathan and William Mandel. The objective is to rotate the walls of the maze to make boxes. Some reviewers found the overall collection of elements to be eccentric and unique.

Jones later teamed with fellow Synapse designer Bill Williams on the biofeedback game suite, Relax.

== Gameplay ==
The drelb at left, screwhead tank on the right, and a pink trollaboar between them (Atari 8-bit)

The playfield is a maze of gates, similar to the Lady Bug arcade game, which can be rotated 90 degrees by pushing into them. The player controls a walking eyeball called a drelb, with the goal of flipping the gates so they create closed boxes. Pursuing the drelb are square trollaboars who can also use the gates, but can't seal them into boxes. There is an empty border on the outside the maze patrolled by screwhead tanks which shoot at the drelb.

Occasionally one of the boxes becomes "drelbish window to the dark corridor". This leads to a separate screen where the goal is to free—by touching—as many drelbs as possible while avoiding gorgolytes. Completing the dark corridor, or kissing a randomly appearing "mystery lady", awards a bonus based on the number of completed boxes.

There are eight rounds, each named after a gemstone, and three difficulty levels: Novice, Tough, and Super.

== Reception ==
In a 1984 ROM magazine review, Tim Ruscheinsky concluded "I highly suggest that you get your copy of Drelbs, especially if you enjoy well made maze games" and scored the game an 8.8 out of 10. Bryan Welch wrote for Antic: "Kelly Jones deserves a hand for an excellent job of programming. With great graphics and sound, and a neat idea, Drelbs is a real winner." In ANALOG Computing, Lee Pappas concluded his review with, "If you are on the lookout for something different, Drelbs combines interesting graphics with a challenging scenario." A 3 out of 5 review in UK-based Commodore User stated, "Fun to play and commendably different." Games magazine called it "visually and aurally beautiful".

George Kopp wrote in Electronic Fun with Computers & Games: "so much of the game seems to be random. Sometimes you'll get lots of opportunities to transport yourself into Drelbsville. Other times you'll close off every square and still not get a Drelbish window." He ended with "A little less luck would have made for more interest."

In a 2009 look at the Commodore 64 version for Retro Videogames Reviewed, the author commented, "Even today, this game manages to captivate me with its unique ambience and absolutely weird, but fun gameplay," and "the game is such fun and so easy to discover and is so captivating". Sean Wheatley included Drelbs on a 2007 list of "Forgotten Gems of the Maze Chase Genre," calling it "one of the oddest maze chase games out there."
