= Sinbad and the Throne of the Falcon =

1987 video game

- Developer: Cinemaware
- Publisher: Cinemaware
- Designer: Bill Williams
- Platforms: Amiga, Atari ST, Apple IIGS, MS-DOS, Commodore 64
- Release: 1987: Amiga; 1988: Atari ST, C64; 1989: MS-DOS
- Genre: Action
- Mode: Single-player

Sinbad and the Throne of the Falcon is a 1987 action-adventure game developed and published by Cinemaware. Set in an Arabian Nights-esque world, the player assumes the role of Sinbad the Sailor, and is commissioned by The Princess to rid the land of the Dark Prince. The game was designed and programmed by Bill Williams for the Amiga, who also wrote Mind Walker. Sinbad and the Throne of the Falcon was ported to the Atari ST, Apple IIGS, MS-DOS, and Commodore 64.

Sinbad draws its inspiration from Hollywood, with a large influence from films such as Jason and the Argonauts as well as the seven other Sinbad films made throughout the 1930s and 1940s.

== Gameplay ==
Gameplay alternates between an open-ended world map, action sequences, and dialog, where the player engages other characters and further conversations and relationships. Choice of dialogue alters the future of the game.

Using the world map, the player can sail to any location, triggering dialogue or an action sequences. In cities, crew members can be hired, while in the deep forests there are shamans and Gypsies to talk with about magic and potions.

=== Action sequences ===
- Sword fighting - after an on-screen prompt of "Pick Up Thy Joystick!", Sinbad battles with wild animals that have come upon his camp, stone idols that had come to life, other pirates, and the Black Prince himself.
- The Cyclops - occasionally, when in remote areas, a cyclops will raid the camp and steal away some of the player's crew. Using a slingshot, the player has to blind the cyclops while avoiding the rocks thrown at him.
- The Shipwreck - coming across pieces of a broken ship in rough waters, Sinbad must steer his boat through the waves, avoiding rocks and picking up drowning sailors, who will eventually join the crew.
- The Earthquake - Sinbad falls into an opening chasm in the earth, and must escape in this quite typical platform sequence.

== Reception ==
Computer Gaming World stated that the Amiga version of Sinbad and the Throne of the Falcon was a "brilliant" tribute to adventure films, but also considered to be uneven as well. It praised the audio and some of the graphics but said that the game's attempt to combine arcade, adventure, and strategy was not completely successful, and concluded that it was "light, entertainment fare, at best".
