= A Day at the Races =

A Day at the Races can refer to:

- A Day at the Races (film), a 1937 film featuring the Marx Brothers
- A Day at the Races (album), a 1976 album by the rock group Queen
- A Day at the Races (video), a DVD of a 2001 live performance by the rock band Stereophonics
- A Day at the Races (video game), 1989 racing video game
- "A Day at the Races", a song by the hip-hop group Jurassic 5 on the 2002 album Power in Numbers
