= Pioneer Plague =

1988 video game

- Developer: Bill Williams
- Publishers: Terrific Software; Mandarin Software
- Platform: Amiga
- Release: 1988
- Genre: Action
- Mode: Single-player

Pioneer Plague is a game designed by Bill Williams for the Amiga computer and published in 1988 by Mandarin Software and Terrific Software. It is one of the few games to use the Hold-And-Modify display mode of the Amiga for in-game graphics, a mode which allows thousands of colors to be displayed at once, but in a format that's better suited to static images than moving objects. It may have been the first commercial game to use Hold-And-Modify. Pioneer Plague was not ported to other systems.

Williams also wrote the 1986 Amiga game Mind Walker.

== Reception ==
Pioneer Plague received an 88% from Amiga Computing and 86% from Zzap!64. British magazine Computer and Video Games was less enthusiastic with an overall score of 39%, commending the graphics but criticizing playability.
