= Alley Cat (video game) =

- Developer: Synapse Software
- Publishers: Synapse Software; IBM (IBM PC)
- Designers: Bill Williams; John Harris (concept)
- Composer: Bill Williams
- Platforms: Atari 8-bit, IBM PC, IBM PCjr
- Release: 1983: Atari; 1984: IBM PC, PCjr
- Genre: Action
- Mode: Single-player

Alley Cat is a video game created by Bill Williams and published by Synapse Software for Atari 8-bit computers in 1983. The player controls Freddy the Cat, who enters people's homes through open windows to perform various tasks in order to reach his love, Felicia. A port for the IBM PC as a self-booting disk and the IBM PCjr were published in 1984 by IBM. These use four-color CGA graphics.

Alley Cat was based on a one-screen prototype by John Harris. Harris had become unhappy with the direction of the game and handed it over to Williams who expanded the concept into a finished game.

== Gameplay ==
Alley Cat
"Alley Cat theme song"
Theme song, as played through the IBM PC speaker

In the main screen, which is the alley, the player is presented with a tall fence in front of an apartment building with several windows. Each window periodically opens to throw out random objects (a phone, shoe, etc.). Every once in a while a dog may come running along the bottom edge of the screen. If the cat touches this dog, they get into a fight and one life is taken away.

By jumping and climbing trash cans, the fence, and clotheslines, the cat can enter various rooms through the open windows. Each room contains one of several challenges:

- In one room there's a table with a birdcage on it in the middle of the room. Here the objective is to push the birdcage off the table and then catch the bird which escapes from the broken cage.
- In another room, there's a fishbowl which the cat can enter and must eat all the fish while dodging electric eels and repeatedly coming up for air to avoid drowning.
- Another room contains a huge chunk of cheese with a number of holes. In each hole mice appear randomly, which the cat must catch.
- The cat may also find itself in a room with a number of sleeping dogs, some of which have feeding dishes in front of them. The cat must empty each dish without waking up any of the dogs.
- In another challenge, the cat must collect three ferns from the top of a bookshelf while avoiding a disproportionately large spider that may lower itself upon the cat from above.

The Atari 8-bit original, with the cat leaving footprints in the room with the fishbowl

The IBM PC port uses CGA graphics, giving a different color scheme than the Atari 8-bit version

Most rooms have a broomstick that constantly moves around the screen. The cat can keep the broom busy by making footprints on the ground (at the bottom edge of the screen). When there are no footprints, the broom will constantly chase after the cat.

The broom is harmless in the sense that it never kills the cat, but it pushes the cat around, enough to make it more difficult if it is not kept busy. In particular, the broom might often throw the cat right at the above-mentioned dog or spider, or throw it right back out of the window.

Successful completion of the challenge is awarded with a number of points proportional to the time taken to complete it. The player then returns to the alley where open windows now show a female cat calling him.

Upon entering such a window, the player encounters a room in which there are several platforms (a bit like shelves) made out of valentine hearts on which other cats walk left and right. The object is to reach the cat at the top while maneuvering around the other cats, which cause the player to fall a level if touched.

Each platform has areas the player can stand on as well as areas where they fall through (the other cats, however, never fall through). These areas are hearts which switch between normal and broken as they are touched by heart-shaped arrows that are constantly shot diagonally across the screen by cherubs on either side of the screen. These arrows also cause the player to fall down a level.

There are also gifts on the bottom row that can be used to eliminate an unfriendly cat for a short period of time. If the player falls from the bottom row, they fail, and must return to the alley and complete another task.

If the cat manages to kiss the female cat in the special room, the level advances by one and the player gains an extra life. The game's difficulty level continues to increase until the multiplier reaches level 30, at which point it stays the same. Gameplay at this level can continue indefinitely, but running out of lives means game over.

== Reception ==
Describing Alley Cat as "a challenging and interesting game with something of a storybook quality to it", Antic in 1985 praised its "really superb" graphics. The magazine concluded that it "is simply a lot of fun to play!".

== Legacy ==
In 2006, the first fan remake Alley Cat 2 made its debut. An unofficial fan remake entitled Alley Cat Remeow Edition was freely released in 2018.
