= One Step Beyond =

One Step Beyond may refer to:

== Music ==
- One Step Beyond (Dungeon album) or the title song, 2004
- One Step Beyond (Jackie McLean album), 1963
- One Step Beyond..., an album by Madness, or the title song (see below), 1979
- One Step Beyond, an album by the Chocolate Watchband, 1969
- One Step Beyond, an album by Chris Ward, 1996
- "One Step Beyond" (song), by Prince Buster, 1964; covered by Madness, 1979
- One Step Beyond, a Canadian jazz band including Andrew Scott
- One Step Beyond, a 1992 rave at Donington Park organized by Fantazia
- One Step Beyond, a ska, bluebeat, and rocksteady radio show on WRAS in Atlanta, Georgia, U.S.

== Television ==
- Alcoa Presents: One Step Beyond, an American anthology television series 1959–1961, hosted by John Newland
- One Step Beyond, a series on the Discovery Channel
- One Step Beyond, a TVB drama series featuring Deric Wan
- "One Step Beyond", a cartoon short by Joe Orrantia and Elizabeth Stonecypher, show 7c of What a Cartoon! (1996)

== Other uses ==
- One Step Beyond, a game for the Amiga system
- One Step Beyond, a skateboarding documentary featuring Brian Sumner
