= Yuri Abramochkin =

Soviet and Russian photographer

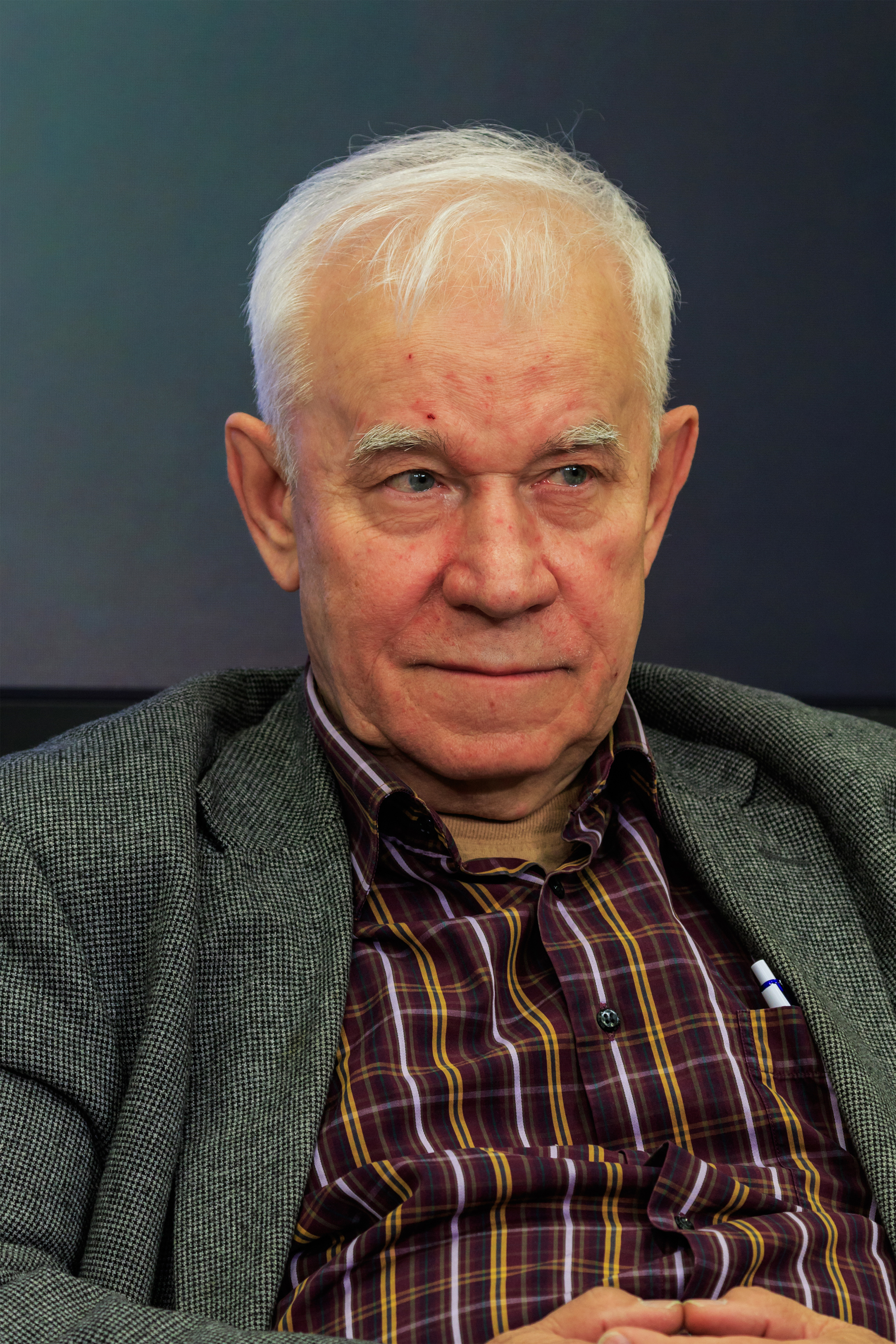
- Abramochkin in 2017
- Born: 11 December 1936; Moscow, USSR
- Died: 5 April 2018 (aged 81); Moscow, Russia
- Known for: Photography
- Movement: Soviet art, photojournalism

Yuri Vasilyevich Abramochkin (Russian: Юрий Васильевич Абрамочкин; 11 December 1936 – 5 April 2018) was a Soviet and Russian photographer and photojournalist.

== Career ==
Abramochkin started to work as a photojournalist at 21, in the office of "Mosstroy" (Main department of building and planning in Moscow) with the primary job of photographing plans. He got a chance to try himself in photography in 1957 when he was offered the position of official photographer of the World Festival of Youth and Students in Moscow. He also took photos of Komsomolskiy Prospekt for "Mosstroy" and those photos were published by Soviet Weekly, the Soviet newspaper for capitalist countries. Abramochkin worked for Soviet Weekly for forty years. In 1961 he started to work as a photographer of the news agency Novosti. Yuri Abramochkin is one of 15 Russian photojournalists included in the encyclopedia Contemporary Photographers, published by St. James Press in 1995.

Abramochkin worked with Soviet and world leaders, politicians and celebrities, making among others the photos of Nikita Khrushchev, Leonid Brezhnev, Mikhail Gorbachev, Boris Yeltsin, Charles de Gaulle, Willy Brandt, François Mitterrand, Richard Nixon, Urho Kekkonen, Jacques Chirac, Bill Clinton, Yuri Gagarin, Ronald Reagan, Valentina Tereshkova and Elizabeth II.

== Gallery ==
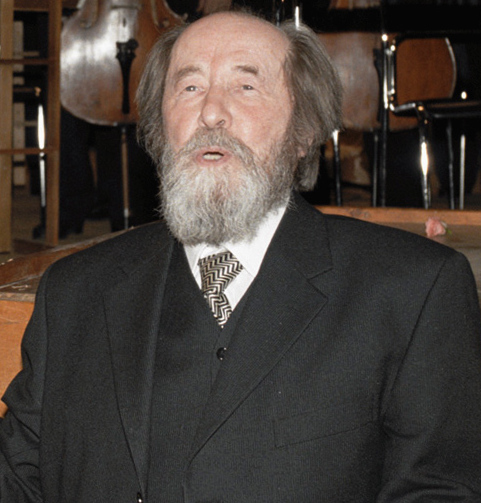

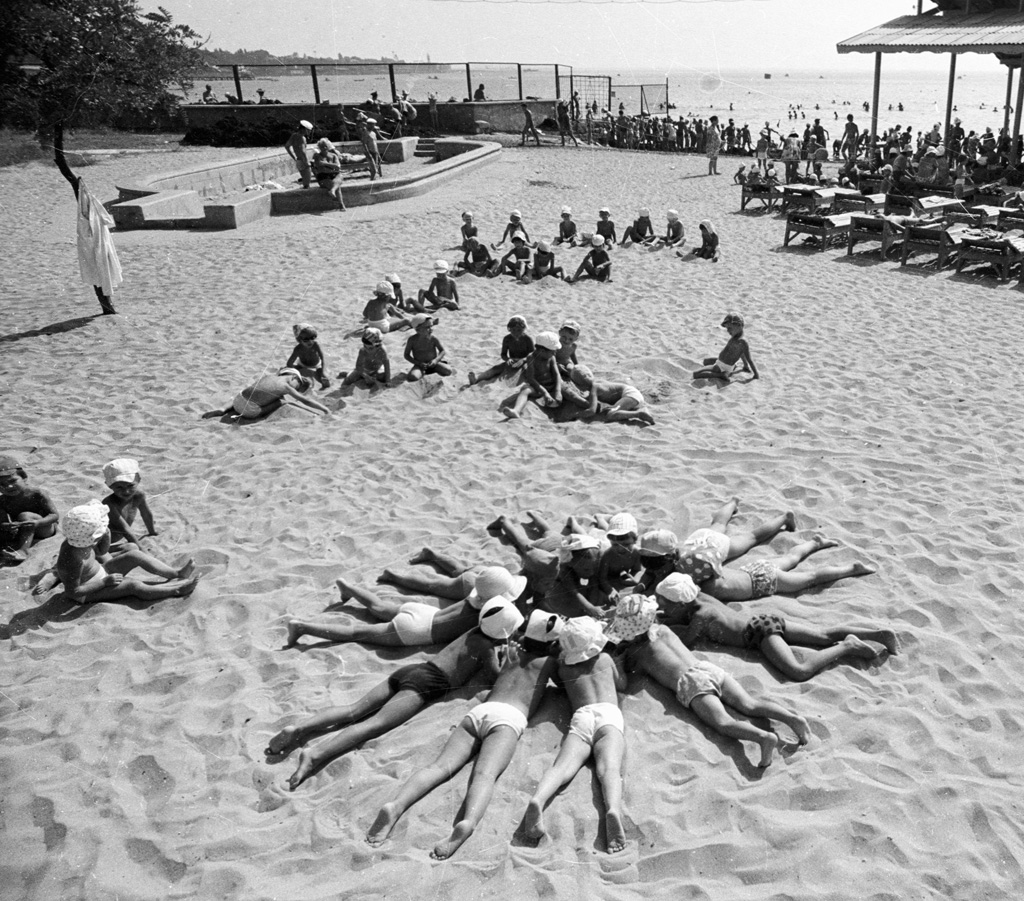

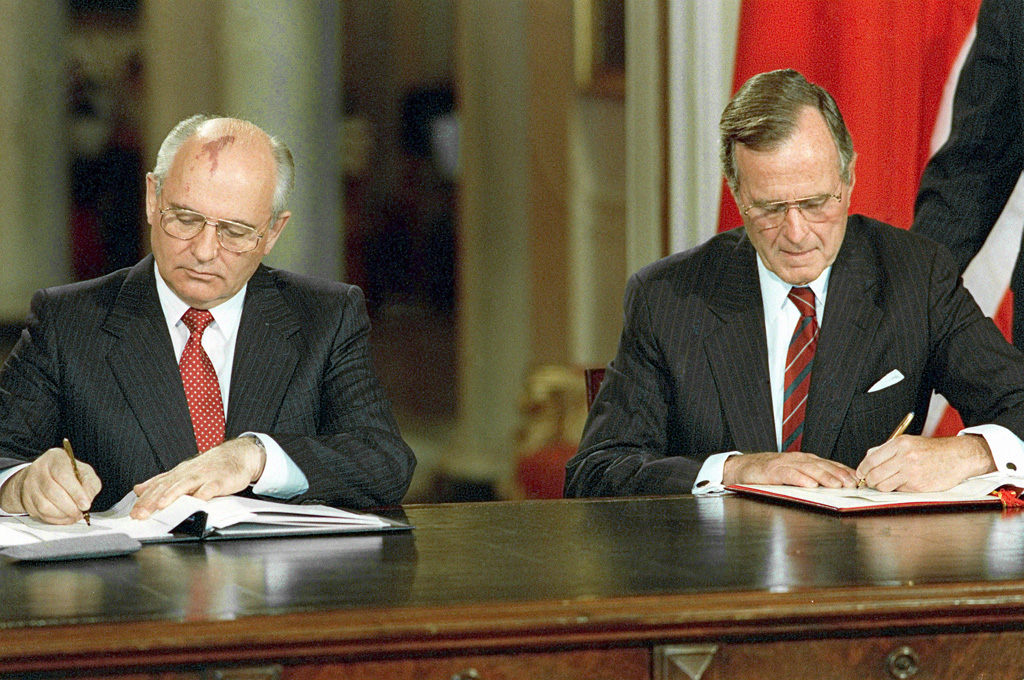

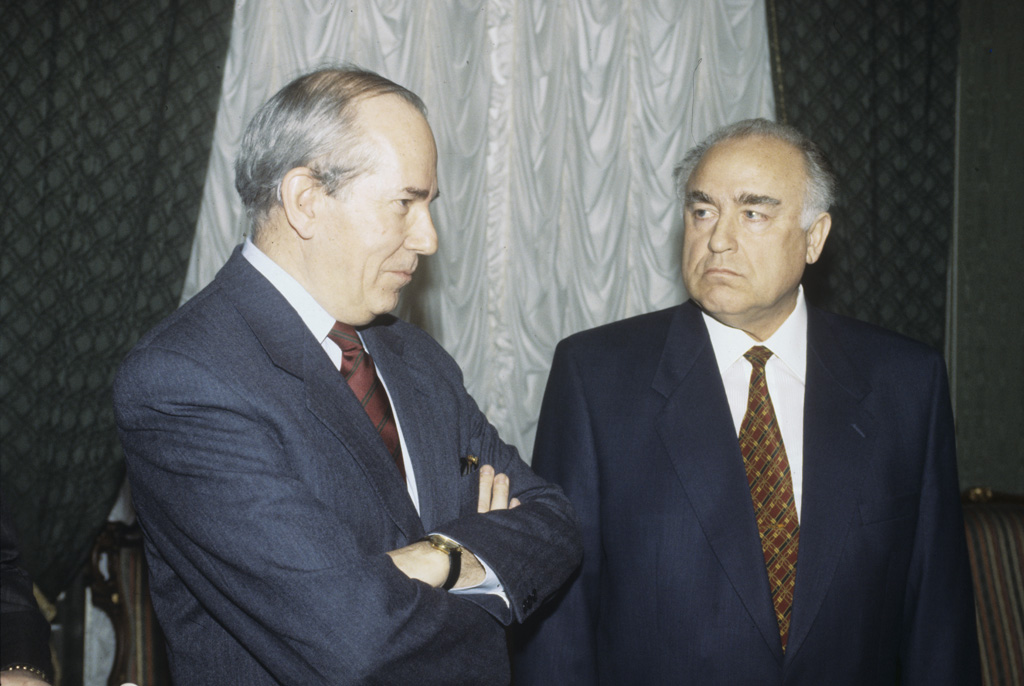

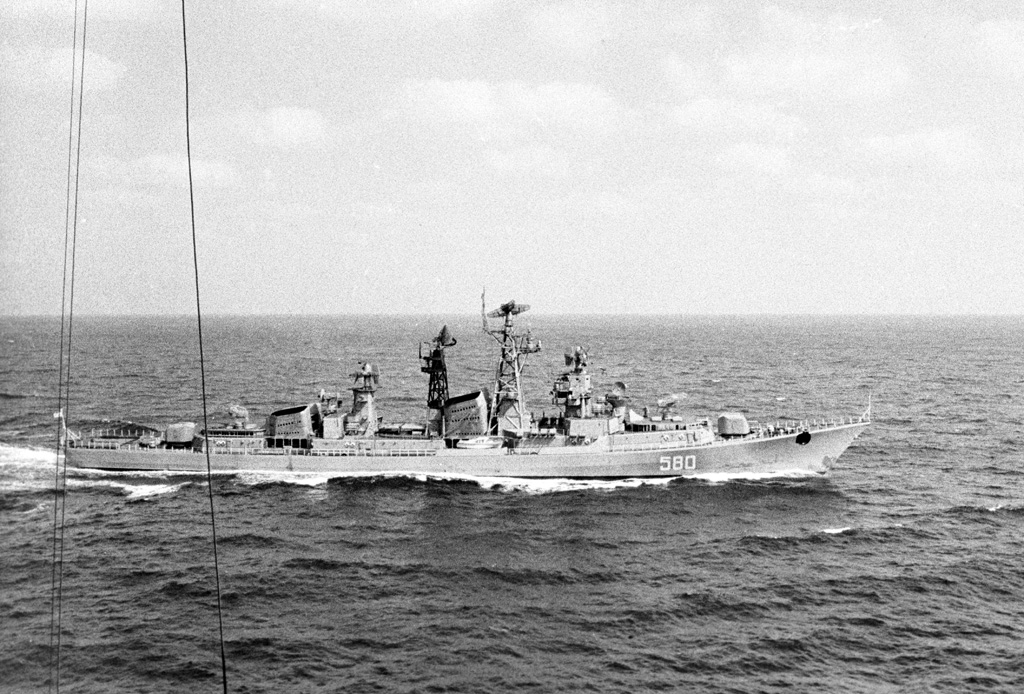

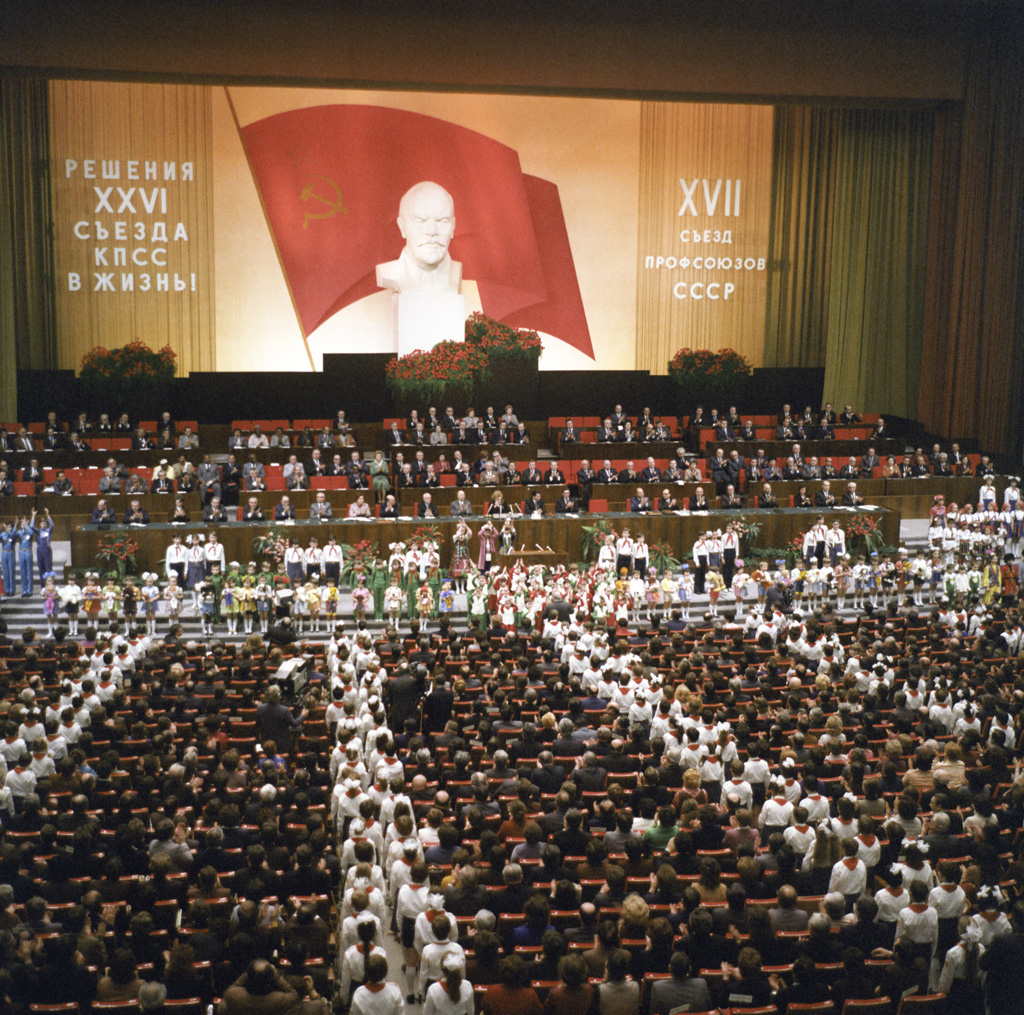

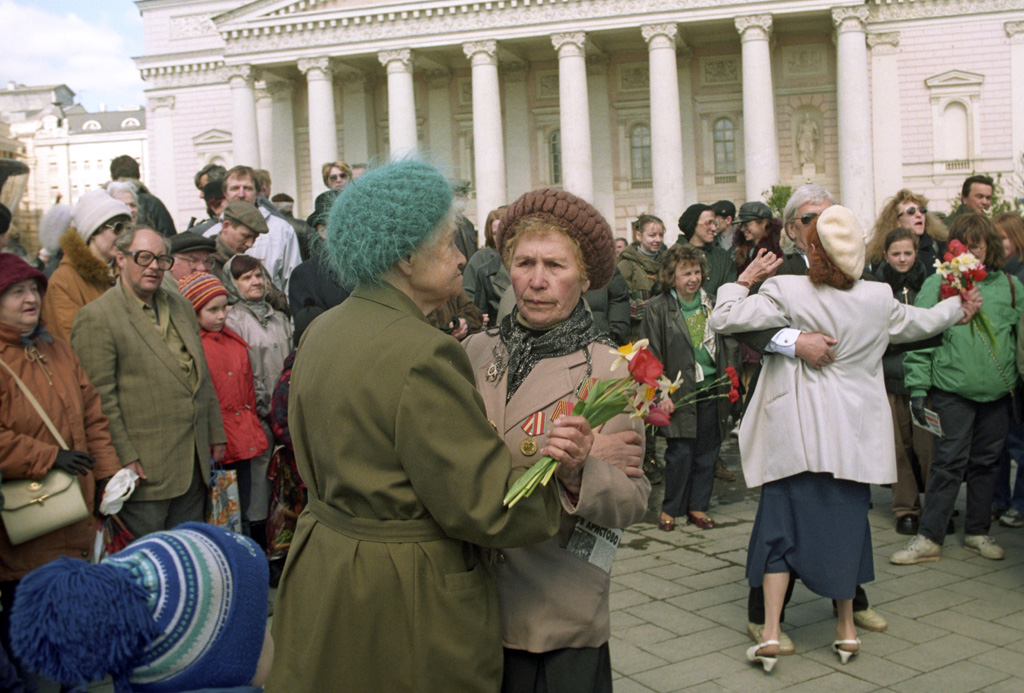

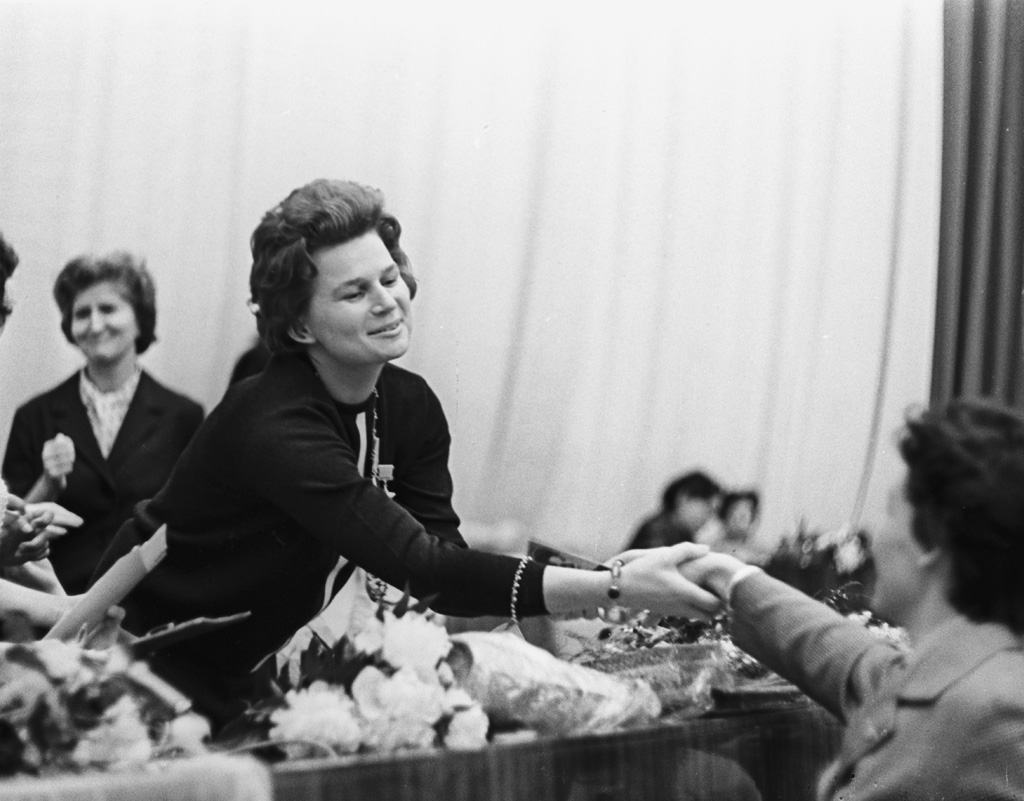

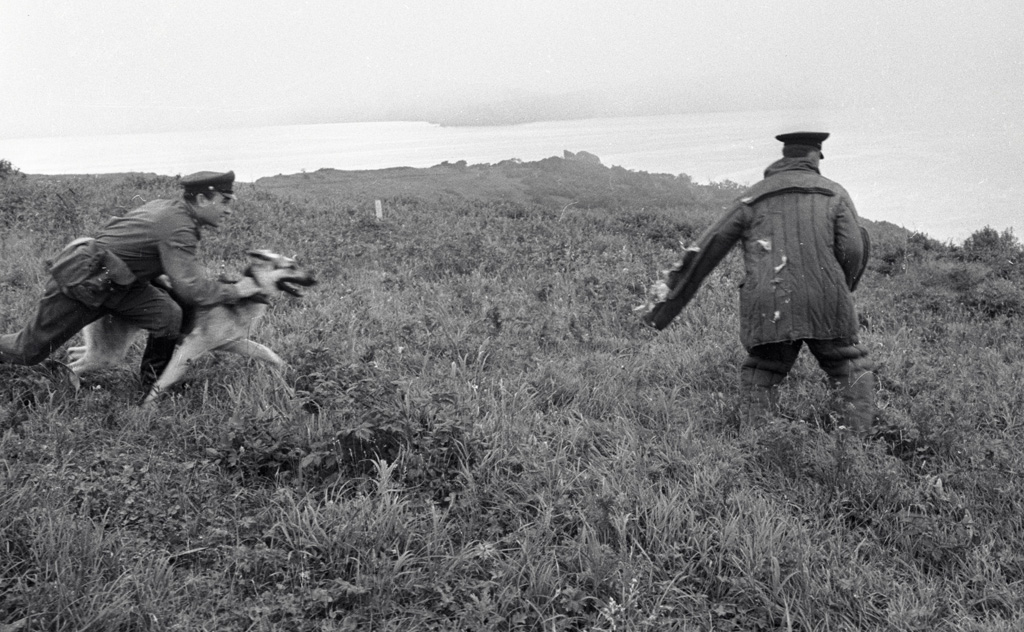

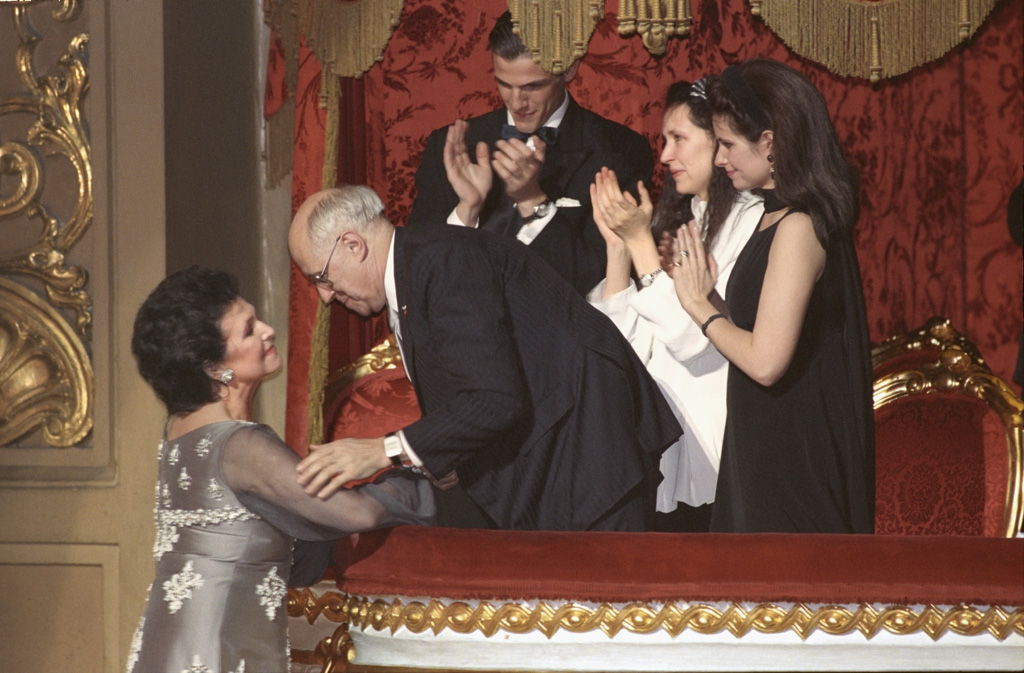

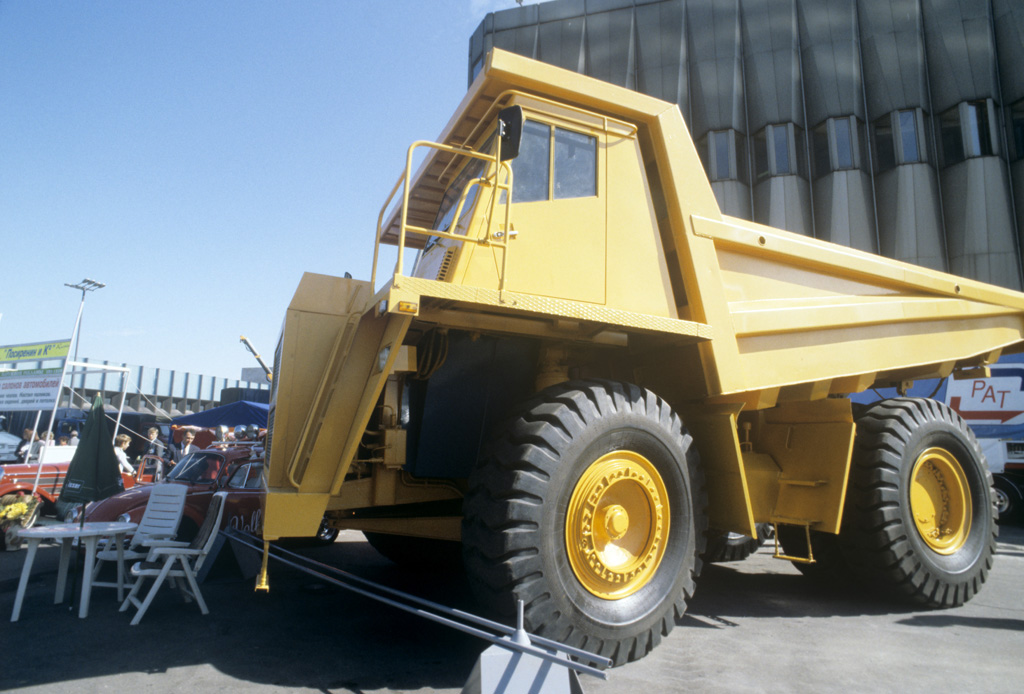

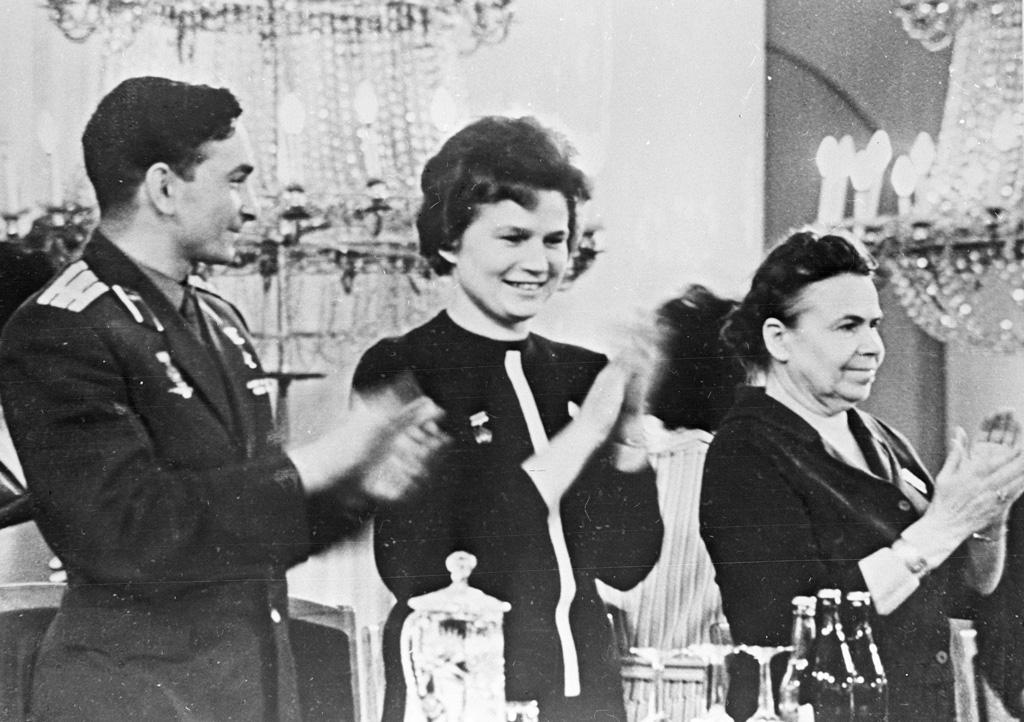

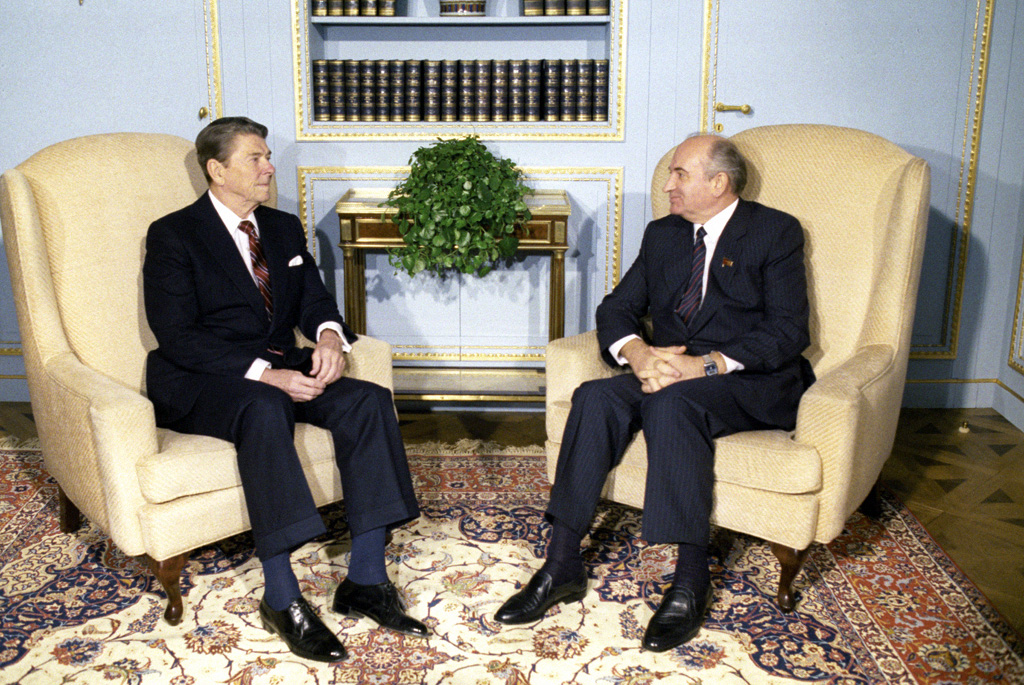

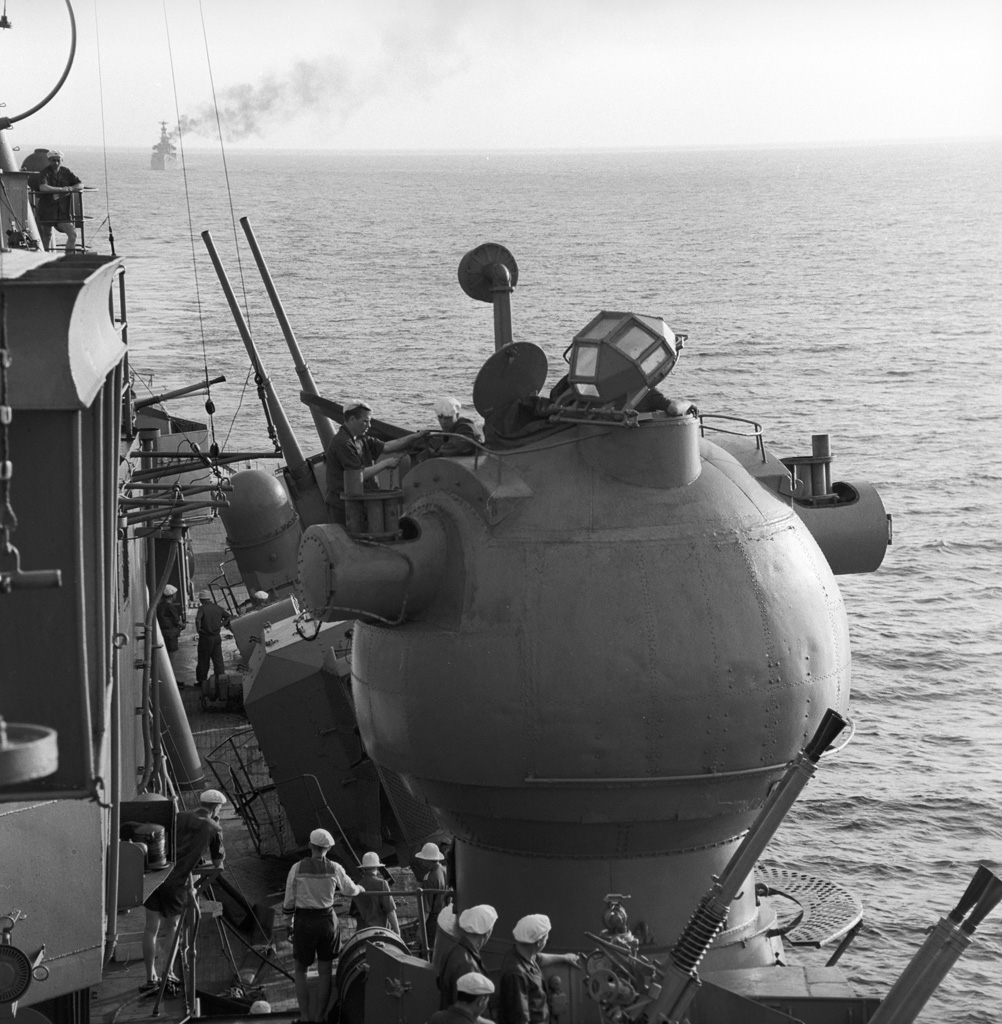

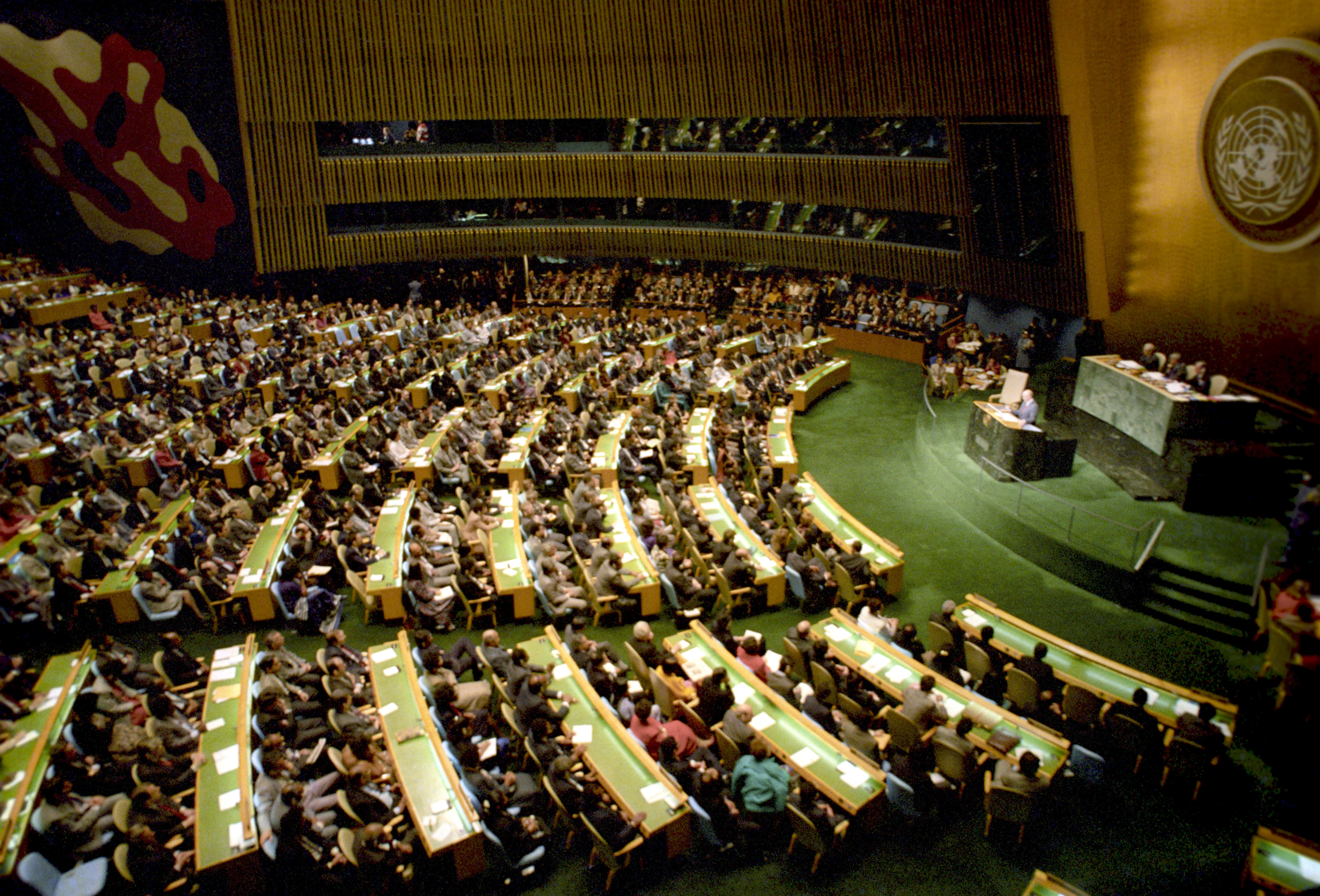

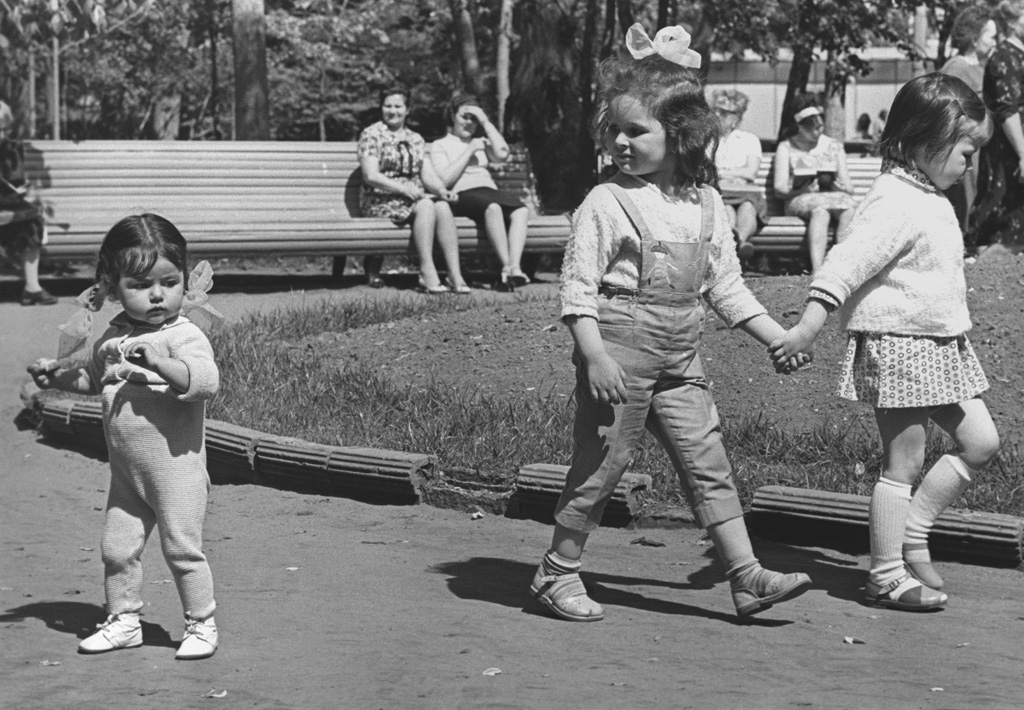

== Exhibitions ==
=== Solo exhibitions ===
- 1970 — Photographs from the U.S.S.R., City Museum, Sopron, Hungary
- 1972 — Yugoslavia
- 1974 — U.S.S.R.: Country and People, Photo Artists' Salon, Belgrade
- 1976 — From the Photographer's Album, House of Culture, Prague
- 1976 — Photographs from the U.S.S.R., Exhibition Pavilion, West Berlin
- 1978 — Photographs from the U.S.S.R., Soviet Cultural Centre, Damascus
- 1978 — Sowjetunion: Land und Leute im Foto, Majakowski Galerie, West Berlin
- 1979 — From the Photographer's Album, Photo and Cine Club, Belgrade
- 1981 — India
- 1981 — Romania
- 1984 — Bulgaria
- 1988 — Yugoslavia
- 2001 — Moscow
- 2002 — France
- 2009 — Yuri Abramochkin — Photoessay. Brothers Lumière Gallery. Moscow

=== Group exhibitions ===
- 1961: National Photo Exhibition, Manege Exhibition Hall, Moscow
- 1962: International Photo-Agency Exhibition, Prague
- 1964: WorldPress Photo, Amsterdam (and 1965–69, 1975–76, 1978)
- 1966: Interpress Photo '66, Manege Exhibition Hall, Moscow
- 1975: Fotosuit de Sovjet Unie, Stedelijk Museum, Amsterdam
- 1976: Photographs from the U.S.S.R., Trade Fair Hall, West Berlin
- 1979: Interpress Photo '79, Havana
- 1980: Sportas Ambassador of Peace, Manege Exhibition Hall, Moscow

== Books ==
- Yuriy Abramochkin, Russia as I see her: Photoalbum 1960–2013. Moscow: Scanrus, 2013. ISBN 9785435000436. Text in English. (Here at Issuu.com.)

== Awards ==
- Golden Eye Award. World Press Photo. 1987. For the picture of Mathias Rust
- Honored Cultural Worker of the RSFSR
