= Necromancer (video game) =

1982 video game

- Cover art by Tim Boxell
- Developer: Synapse Software
- Publishers: Synapse Software; Atari Corporation
- Designer: Bill Williams
- Composer: Bill Williams
- Platforms: Atari 8-bit, Commodore 64
- Release: 1982: Atari 8-bit 1983: C64; 1987: XEGS cartridge
- Genre: Action
- Mode: Single-player

Necromancer is an action game created by Bill Williams for Atari 8-bit computers and published by Synapse Software in 1982. A port to the Commodore 64 followed in 1983. The game was rereleased by Atari Corporation on cartridge in the style of the Atari XEGS in 1987.

The player controls the wizard Illuminar who attempts to grow an army of trees to attack Tetragorn the Necromancer and his evil minions that are trying to take over a graveyard. The game is divided into three sections with unique gameplay, and the player's success in each affects the one that follows it.

== Gameplay ==
Necromancer consists of three sections, as in a three-act play: The Forest, The Vaults, The Graveyard.

=== The Forest ===
First stage: The Forest (Atari 8-bit)

Illuminar stands fixed in the middle of the screen. Moving the joystick controls his "wisp", a magical boomerang-like device. Pressing the fire button plants a seed that will slowly grow into a tree in several stages to adulthood. Ogres appear from both sides of the screen, walking across it horizontally. If they walk over an immature tree, it shrinks back one stage of growth, eventually disappearing. Spiders occasionally appear and move randomly about the screen. If they move over a fully grown tree, it becomes poisoned, and will eventually die. Both enemies can be killed by touching them with the wisp, which will also cure poisoned trees.

Eye-Pods containing additional seeds sometimes appear and can be picked up with the wisp. The speed of the action increases continually through the level until it becomes hectic.

=== The Vaults ===
Second stage: The Vaults (Atari 8-bit)

Every tree that survives the first level becomes Illuminar's ally in the second: The Vaults. Here the player enters a five-level side-view map of a crypt filled with spider eggs. Using the wisp, the player selects trees and moves them over the coffins where their roots grow into the roof of them and eventually break through to crush the eggs below. If they take too long, spiders will hatch and attack the trees until the wisp kills them. Occasionally the Hands of Fate descend from the roof, picking up anything below them and sometimes dropping prizes.

The player must move through the vaults while all of this takes place, capturing question-mark prizes in order to extend ladders needed to reach lower levels. On this level, moving the joystick normally moves Illuminar, but holding down the fire button freezes him in place and moves the wisp instead.

=== The Graveyard ===
The final confrontation between Illuminar and Tetragorn takes place in a graveyard. Gravestones appear that must be destroyed by walking over them in order to prevent Tetragorn from emerging. When he does, (there are always enough gravestones to ensure this) he shoots trails of fire that injure Illuminar as he moves about. Any spider eggs that were not destroyed in the vaults also turn into spiders which attack Illuminar. The wisp can be used to banish either enemy, although while it is in use, Illuminar remains fixed in place.

Each hit by any enemy on Illuminar reduces his power and eventually kills him, although the occasional appearance of small rings of power will improve his life force again.

== Reception ==
Hosea Battles Jr reviewed the game for Computer Gaming World and stated that "This is definitely one of the best games in the Synapse line for the Atari. Even the best arcader will have a difficult time defeating the wizard and reaching level five of Act Three."

Necromancer was noted for its oddball concepts and frenetic gameplay. Creative Computing said that it "is one of the strangest, yet most imaginative, games I have ever played on the Atari computer", and "well-conceived and beautifully implemented. The sound and graphics are out of this world". Agreeing on its strangeness, InfoWorld's Essential Guide to Atari Computers cited it as a "winner". Brian Bagnall considered it one of William's most notable releases on the Atari, among a notable career. It remains a common fixture of articles on retro gaming.
