= MiG-29 Fulcrum (1990 video game) =

1990 video game

- Developer: Simis
- Publisher: Domark
- Platforms: Acorn Archimedes, Amiga, Atari ST, MS-DOS
- Release: 1990
- Genre: Combat flight simulator
- Mode: Single-player

MiG-29 Fulcrum is a combat flight simulator video game released by Domark in 1990 for the Acorn Archimedes, Amiga, Atari ST and MS-DOS PC platforms.

In 1991 an enhanced version was released as MiG-29M Super Fulcrum.

== Overview ==
The player flies a Mikoyan MiG-29 on solo missions against a range of enemies around the world. There are six available missions:

1. Basic Training
2. Arctic reconnaissance
3. Combat over the Great Wall of China
4. Oil refinery attack
5. Anti-terrorist attack
6. Nuclear plant attack

The MiG-29 is armed with AA-8 Aphid air-to-air missiles, AS-7 Kerry air-to-surface missiles, S-24 rockets, as well as a cannon. Enemies include SAMs, Harriers, Shenyang F-7s, Mirage 2000s and other MiG-29s.

== Development ==
The Amiga and Atari ST versions of MiG-29 Fulcrum lack the option of a complex mode, limiting the game to simple mode only. British pilot John Farley was consulted during MiG-29 Fulcrum's development as he was one of the few people outside of Russia to have flown a real MiG-29 Fulcrum; his input changed some aspects of the game. Farley stated that the game isn't "oversimplified", calling it "the nearest thing to actually flying the plane". While the game was programmed by Simis, MiG-29 Fulcrum was designed by the game studio The Kremlin. MiG-29 Fulcrum's simulation software was written in C by David Payne and Jonathan Newth; Payne previously worked at British Aerospace, and Newth once worked for IBM. The MiG-29 Fulcrum plane was selected as The Kremlin team felt that many American planes already had simulations created for them, and selected the MiG-29 while reading Soviet Weekly. The Russian News Agency (TASS) assisted in MiG-29 Fulcrum's development, providing flight data, information regarding the MiG-29's weapons, as well as access to their photo archive.

== Reception ==
Reception

Review scores
Publication	Score
The One	89% (DOS)
Computer Gaming World	2.5/5 (DOS)

The One gave the DOS version of MiG-29 Fulcrum an overall score of 89%, calling it "one of the best introductions to the world of flight simulators" due to the difficulty options of 'simple' or 'complex', and further said that the plane is "a joy to fly". The One praised the realism of the simulation in complex mode, but criticized the game's overall presentation, expressing that other flight simulators have more customisable options, such as choosing weapons & marking waypoints, which MiG-29 Fulcrum lacks.

Computer Gaming World's 1992 and 1994 surveys of wargames with modern settings gave the game two and a half stars out of five, and criticized the game's realism.
