= Salmon Run =

1982 video game

- Developer: Bill Williams
- Publishers: Atari Program Exchange; Synapse Software (VIC)
- Platforms: Atari 8-bit, VIC-20
- Release: 1982: Atari 8-bit 1983: VIC-20
- Genre: Action
- Modes: Single-player, multiplayer

Salmon Run is a 1982 video game for Atari 8-bit computers created by Bill Williams and distributed via the Atari Program Exchange. Salmon Run was the first game in Williams's career, followed by a string of successes noted for their oddball concepts. The player takes the role of Sam the Salmon, swimming upriver to mate. Along the way, he encounters waterfalls, a bear, fishermen, and seagulls.

In 1983, Salmon Run was released for the VIC-20 by Synapse Software under the Showcase Software label.

== Gameplay ==
Sam the Salmon being chased by a black bear (Atari 8-bit)

Salmon Run is an overhead view, vertically scrolling game. As the river scrolls, the player primarily moves side-to-side to avoid obstacles.

Each player starts with one life and gains another for each successful round. Hitting the rocks or bank of the river drains Sam's life slightly. Along the way, there are a series of rapids which will stop Sam's motion upriver until he jumps them by pressing the fire button. After landing, Sam dips underwater and can stay there by holding down the button. More dangerous are the bears, fishermen, and seagulls that will kill Sam instantly if caught, but can be avoided by careful swimming or hiding underwater.

On reaching the end of the map, Sam meets and kisses Samantha, and the round starts over with a new map and more enemies.

== Reception ==
In 1982, Softline remarked on the unusual gameplay of saving things, not destroying them. The magazine praised the "outstanding ... remarkably lifelike" sound effects, and concluded that "Salmon Run is a charming game that gives the player a genuine sense of ecological accomplishment; it's also quick to learn and quite contagious".
