= Ninja Spirit =

1988 video game

- Arcade flyer
- Developers: Irem; Bits Studios (Game Boy)
- Publishers: Irem; NEC (TurboGrafx-16); Activision (Amstrad CPC)
- Composer: Masahiko Ishida
- Platforms: Arcade, TurboGrafx-16, Amiga, Amstrad CPC, Atari ST, Commodore 64, Game Boy, ZX Spectrum
- Release: Arcade: JP: August 4, 1988; NA: October 1988 TurboGrafx-16; JP: July 6, 1990
- Genres: Hack and slash, platform
- Mode: Single-player

Ninja Spirit (Note: Japanese: 最後の忍道, Hepburn: Saigo no Nindō; lit. 'The Final Path of a Ninja') is a 1988 hack and slash platform video game developed and published by Irem for arcades. Although praised by gamers for detailed graphics, serious themes, solid controls and gameplay, the game also was criticized for its harsh difficulty.

== Gameplay ==
Arcade screenshot

Tsukikage's journey takes him through seven stages, varying from woodlands, wastelands, swamps, temples, and cliffs. Each stage begins with the player slashing their way to the end until they confront a level boss.

The ninja is always armed with the katana named Muramasa (meaning Righteous Cloud), which can be fluidly used to attack in all directions. Extra weapons include the Uzha (meaning Swirling Leaf) (shurikens), the Raitake (meaning Bamboo Thunder) bombs, and the Shoryusai (meaning Rising Dragon) kusarigama. There are also several power-up items, such as one unleashing multiple ninja ghosts to assist the player.

== Plot ==
The game's hero, Tsukikage (月影), is a young ninja who lost his father to a mysterious half-man half-beast creature. The plot of Ninja Spirit is based on the quest of his way to avenge his father in an alternative feudal Japan.

== Ports ==
The game was ported to multiple platforms. The TurboGrafx-16 port includes two modes, a PC Engine mode which players lose one life only if all 5 energy points are used up (certain enemies can kill Tsukikage with one hit), and the Arcade mode, which is a more challenging mode where any attack are grounds for players to lose one ninja instantly. The port was released on the Wii's Virtual Console in 2007 and Wii U in 2015 in Japan and 2017 for North America and Europe.

Hamster Corporation released the game as part of the Arcade Archives series for the Nintendo Switch and PlayStation 4 in 2019.

== Reception ==
Reception

Review scores
Publication	Score
Famitsu	8/10, 8/10, 9/10, 7/10 (PC-Engine)
GamePro	23/25

In Japan, Game Machine listed Ninja Spirit on their September 1, 1988 issue as being the fifth most-successful table arcade unit of the month, outperforming titles like The Main Event.

In issue 15 of Electronic Gaming Monthly, both Ninja Spirit and Ys Book I & II were the first games to receive a perfect 10 in the magazine's history. In 2010, CraveOnline featured this version in the article Top 10 Ninja Games Of All Time, comparing it with Legend of Kage for the NES, but considered both "challenging" and "relaxing" at the same time.

== Legacy ==
Ninja Spirit later appeared in the Japan-only Game Boy title, Shuyaku Sentai Irem Fighter along with other characters from the game, as well as characters from three other Irem franchises: R-Type, Battle Chopper, and Hammerin' Harry.
