= Soviet Weekly =

Russian English language newspaper

The Soviet Weekly was a propagandistic newspaper, published from 1942 until 1991, that gave news of the Soviet Union in English. Its stated aim was "to assist in the development of British-Soviet friendship by providing an objective picture of Soviet life and opinion."

Published by Sovinformburo, the Press Department of the Soviet Union, at the Soviet Embassy in Britain, its first edition (as the Soviet War News Weekly) appeared in 1942 (the year after the German invasion led to the USSR becoming an ally of the UK). The final issue was that of 5 December 1991, three weeks before the Soviet Union was dissolved.

Issued on Thursdays and offering "an up-to-the-minute and authentic picture of the USSR", it had a modest cover price (6d, or two and a half pence, in 1967), but most issues were distributed free. In 1946, the weekly print-run was 75,000.

One of its early editors was the screenwriter, novelist and (later) pagan, Stewart Farrar (1916-2000). Mary Rosser-Hicks (1937-2010), the future chief executive of the Peoples Printing Press socialist daily the Morning Star, worked for the paper until 1975, as did South African anti-apartheid activist Shanthie Naidoo during the early 1970s.

Soviet and Russian photographer Yuriy Abramochkin worked in Soviet Weekly for almost 40 years.

== In popular culture ==
The comedian and writer Alexei Sayle has described how this was the newspaper his Communist parents read during his upbringing in Liverpool in the 1950s and 1960s.

As a child growing up in Glasgow, Graham McTavish, who played Dougal MacKenzie in the TV adaptation of Diana Gabaldon's Outlander series, recounts surprise in learning no other child's family had Soviet Weekly delivered.
