= A Day at the Races (video game) =

1989 video game

- Developer: Team Software
- Publisher: Team Software
- Platform: Atari ST
- Release: 1989
- Genre: Racing

A Day at the Races is a 1989 video game published by Team Software.

== Gameplay ==
A Day at the Races is a game in which the database has room for 500 horses and 50 jockeys, both named and customized by the player. The game is a horse racing simulation that allows wagers and payoffs, and for each racing session players can select the number of races, the track conditions, how many horses are in each race and other aspects of the racing card for the day, or allow the computer to select them randomly. The game is multi-player and allows up to 15 players to compete, although each race has a minimum of 4 horses with the computer controlling any not played by humans. Each player has a $1000 bankroll at the beginning of a meet that can be used for betting, or obtaining new horses at auction or by purchasing horses.

== Reception ==
Brian Walker reviewed Omni-Play Horse Racing and A Day at the Races for Games International magazine, and gave it a rating of 9 out of 10, and stated that "If anything, there is almost too much information to digest in ADAR. In the betting version of the game, ADAR probably wins by a length."

Ken Warner for STart appreciated the game's attention to details, and called it "an absorbing simulation with its faithful and detailed recreation of horse-racing handicapping information".

Joystick Hebdo found the game boring and felt that naming all the horses and jockeys took too much time.
