= Necronom =

1990 video game

- Developer(s): Lunatic Software
- Publisher(s): Linel
- Platform(s): Amiga
- Release: 1990
- Genre(s): Scrolling shooter
- Mode(s): Single-player

Necronom is a 1990 shoot'em up video game developed by English studio Lunatic Software and published by Linel for the Amiga.

== Gameplay ==
Necronom is a horizontally scrolling shooter. The player controls a spaceship that flies from the left side of the screen to the right while shooting and dodging enemies. Aspects of the ship can be upgraded with points (that are awarded after completion of each level) like firepower, ship and bullet speed, shield, and different kinds of bombs. There are 32 levels (called "zones") altogether and after the first level the player can choose from one of three routes to take from the map screen. The game includes a password system for saving the game.

== Reception ==
Reception

Review scores
Publication	Score
Aktueller Software Markt	8/12
Amiga Format	23%
Amiga Power	78%
Amiga Joker	77%
The Australian Commodore and Amiga Review	87%

Necronom was noted by most reviewers for its high difficulty. The Australian Commodore and Amiga Review praised the moody and lively music but criticized the graphics and sound effects. It was summarized as "a great shoot-em-up". Amiga Computing said the game is "passable to good in all departments". The gameplay was described as "impossible yet addictive". Amiga Power liked the presentation and gameplay but said an autofire capable joystick is required to enjoy the game. Amiga Format said the game is too difficult, unappealing, and unoriginal. The only good part of the game was said to be the intro sequence. Amiga Joker gave a positive review and wrote that the game is in the same class as R-Type, Xenon 2 and X-Out but not quite as good.
