= MiG-29M Super Fulcrum =

1991 video game

- Publisher: Domark
- Platforms: Archimedes, Amiga, Atari ST, MS-DOS
- Release: 1991
- Genre: Combat flight simulator

MiG-29M Super Fulcrum is a combat flight simulation game published in 1991 by Domark. It is a sequel to MiG-29 Fulcrum.

== Reception ==
John S. Davison for Page 6 said: "I found it quite enjoyable [...] but [...] I consider it a beginner's flight simulator, rather than one for the expert flightsim fan".

Colin Campbell for Amiga Power said: "For the technically minded flight simer this [...] could prove a very good buy. The trouble is, it isn't a game that's been designed to be fun per se, and while many people will love it I suspect that some, attracted by the subject rather than the software, will be in for a rather confusing time".

Andy Hutchinson for PC Format wrote: "Graphically and technically, the game is excellent. The neatly designed campaign element will satisfy strategy fans, while the instant death merchant will enjoy the ability to zip straight into the heart of a dogfight. Immense fun".

Ocean Power wrote: "MiG-29 Super Fulcrum doesn't just offer the keen flight sim enthusiast a chance to experience the delights of an exotic and unusual fighter plane, it's also a fine flight simulation program in its own right. A must for flight 'n' fight fans".

Paul Rigby for Computer Games Strategy Plus said: "An enthusiast with cash to spare might find Super Fulcrum worth a look for its technical achievements. But look elsewhere if you're watching the pennies and cents".

Kati Hamza for The One for ST Games wrote that "there's nothing else quite like it: it's nice to see a politically neutral flight sim for once and if you're after a technically impressive flying experience Soviet-style, MiG 29M is hard to beat".

David Wilson for Zero said: "If you loved the first game [...] or if it's the notion of flying MiGs that really turns you on, this version is radically improved in the playability stakes and also offers a whole new scenario".

Sam Greenhill for Acorn User said: "Despite the odd improvement, we have taken a step backwards. Super Fulcrum contains only one, albeit very large, mission and thus lacks the welcome diversity offered by Fulcrum".

=== Reviews ===
- Computer Studio (Polish)
- Amiga Format - Dec, 1991
- ACE (Advanced Computer Entertainment) - Nov, 1991
- Amiga Action - Dec, 1991
