= Kang Fu =

1996 video game

- Amiga CD32 cover art
- Developer: GREat Effects Development
- Platforms: Amiga, Amiga CD32
- Release: 1996
- Genre: Platformer
- Mode: Single-player

Kang Fu is a platform game released for the Amiga and Amiga CD32 in 1996 and the only title from Dutch-based studio GREat Effects Development (GREED). The game is notable for its use of the Amiga Advanced Graphics Architecture to generate high-colour graphics through hundreds of digitized sprites from stock images.

== Gameplay ==
A screenshot of Kang Fu.

Kang Fu is a platform game in which the player controls the kangaroo Klont, who is tasked to collect kangaroos, defeat enemies, collect bonuses and find the exit to the next level. Players are able to defeat enemies using weapons such as eggs, bombs, boomerangs, guns and boxing gloves spread throughout levels. The game features a password system, and three difficulty levels, with a demo level and a reduced difficulty beginner mode that provides players with additional lives and weapons. The game features ten levels, each with its own end level boss and sub-level, across 600 screens.

== Development ==
Development of Kang Fu aimed to harness the capabilities of the Advanced Graphics Architecture, with the intention of the game being playable on the Amiga CD32 and A4000 or A1200 Amiga units with a CD-ROM drive. The game was advertised as supporting enhanced graphical capabilities using the AGA, using hold and modify techniques on digitised sprites to display a high color pallette of 1000 colors on screen. Some marketing for the game was spurious, including claims of graphics "as never seen on any game console", and false claims the game was "playable" and would "work on all AGA Amigas and "boot easily from any workbench".

Kang Fu was developed over two years. Publications were offered limited or incomplete previews of the game, which led some reviewers such as Steve Faragher of Amiga Power to assume the game may be of poor quality. The game was released with system requirements for a minimum of 1.8 MB of computer memory, comprising almost all of the 2 MB memory available on the Amiga A1200 and Amiga CD32 and being prone to memory leaks. This led to the unusual requirement listed in the manual requiring players to disable all disk and hard drives on the A1200, or start the disc without closing the door of the Amiga CD32 console to play the game. This led some reviewers to assume that the game was not compatible with the Amiga CD32.

== Reception ==
Reception

Review scores
Publication	Score
Amiga Computing	80%
Amiga Format	20%
Amiga Informer	B
CU Amiga	60%

Kang Fu received mixed to negative reception from Amiga publications. Reviews of Kang Fu were largely divided on the merits of the collage design of the game's graphics. Peter Olafson of Amazing Computer Magazine noted the game's "hand-drawn sprites are rather woeful", comparing the assets to clip art. Mark Forbes of CU Amiga stated "graphically, Kang Fu is a complete mess...the green, purple and brown colour scheme is like a visual equivalent of smelling salts. If that wasn't enough to give you a raging headache then the jerky sprites and scrolling are sure to finish the job." Andy Smith of Amiga Format critiqued the graphics, stating "I'm sure the game creators are doing something very clever to get the mix of digitised images and Dpaint sprites, but they've wasted their time". In a more balanced review, Jason Compton of Amiga Report found the visuals "very accomplished" with "one of the most elaborate graphics sets I've ever seen", but conceded the game had an "uneven presentation" that "makes you wonder what exactly, the game is trying to accomplish. It's a blending but not a masterfully executed blending".

Further areas of criticism of Kang Fu related to the platformer gameplay and controls. Ken Anderson of Amiga Report dismissed the gameplay, stating "there are too many "leaps of faith", where the player simply can't tell whether he/she can make it to the next platform; a missed jump means another two minutes making the way back up the playfield, no doubt only to miss it again. Finding the exit is easier said than done, and the only puzzle elements in Kang Fu are of the "find the key for the lock" variety." the play Writing for Amiga Format, Andy Smith stated that the game featured "shambolic gameplay" and that it "looks and plays like a joke". Royan Webb of Amiga Informer stated the game's joystick handling was "touchy" and had "some difficulty switching weapons" which "detracted from the playability" of the game.
