= Omni-Play Horse Racing =

1989 video game

- Developer: DesignStar Consultants
- Publisher: SportTime
- Platforms: Amiga, Commodore 64, DOS
- Release: 1989

Omni-Play Horse Racing is a 1989 video game published by SportTime.

== Gameplay ==
Omni-Play Horse Racing is a game in which a horse racing system is featured with 128 horses listed in its database.

== Reception ==
Johnny L. Wilson reviewed the game for Computer Gaming World, and stated that "Omni-Play Horse Racing is an excellent simulation of the Sport of Kings. The number of variables factored into each race and the entertainment value provided put this product into the 'Winner's Circle"."

Brian Walker reviewed Omni-Play Horse Racing and A Day at the Races for Games International magazine, and gave it a rating of 10 out of 10, and stated that "if stable management is your game then HR just shades it over ADAR."
