= Knights of the Crystallion =

1990 adventure puzzle video game

- Developer: Bill Williams
- Publisher: U.S. Gold
- Composer: Bill Williams
- Platform: Amiga
- Release: EU: 1990
- Genre: Adventure
- Mode: Single-player

Knights of the Crystallion is a 1990 video game for the Amiga developed by Bill Williams and published by U.S. Gold. A fantasy-themed adventure game comprising a mix of sub-games with a puzzle element, the game makes extensive use of the Amiga computer's Hold-And-Modify graphics mode.

Psygnosis was offered the game before U.S. Gold, but turned it down for being too weird.

== Development ==
Bill Williams, the developer of the game, stated that he "threw most of [his] soul into" the game's development and that he considered the game to be his "epic" and "masterpiece."

== Reception ==
Allen Greenberg reviewed the game for Computer Gaming World, and stated that "The diverse yet interlocking segments of Knights of the Crystallion have been well-balanced and orchestrated so that the result is enjoyable. Certain moments, however, such as the ordeal with the crystals, have led this reviewer to wonder what European publishers fear to lose should someone (heaven forbid!) actually win one of their games."

Amiga Format wrote, "the hypnotic quality will keep you playing for hours at a time," and gave an overall score of 91%.

In 2018, BoingBoing called Knights of the Crystallion "the wonderfully weird and impenetrable magnum opus of legendary game designer Bill Williams, which baffled Amiga owners."
