= Relax (software) =

1984 suite of self-improvement software

- Original authors: Kelly Jones; Bill Williams
- Developer: Synapse Software
- Initial release: 1984
- Platform: Atari 8-bit
- Type: Self-improvement

Relax is a suite of self-improvement software written by Kelly Jones and Bill Williams for Atari 8-bit computers and published by Synapse Software in 1984. Subtitled "The Stress Reduction System", Relax uses a headband containing sensors attached to electromyograph hardware to provide audio/visual feedback in three interactive programs. It also includes a 25-minute cassette tape of guided relaxation.

== Features ==
Relax is a package of three programs: a continuous graph of the user's tension level; a program that displays kaleidoscopic patterns with color changing tones; and a game which encourages the player to use tension and relaxation to win using a headband that monitors the player's muscle tension.

== Reception ==
Roy Wagner reviewed the software for Computer Gaming World, and stated that "Next time you've played a stressful game or have too many hours at the joystick, before you shot off your computer, load this program and r-e-l-a-x-x-x-...."
