= Napoleon vs. The Evil Monarchies: The Battle of Austerlitz =

1989 video game

- Developer: Cornerstone Software
- Publisher: General Quarters Software
- Platforms: Amiga, MS-DOS
- Release: 1989

Napoleon vs. The Evil Monarchies: The Battle of Austerlitz is a strategy video game developed by Cornerstone Software for the Amiga and MS-DOS and published in 1989 by General Quarters Software.

== Gameplay ==
The Battle of Austerlitz is a game in which the 1805 Battle of Austerlitz between Napoleon I (France) against Tsar Alexander I (Russia) and Francis I (Austria) is simulated.

== Reception ==
M. Evan Brooks reviewed the game for Computer Gaming World, and stated that "BOA is a Napoleonic simulation of introductory/medium complexity. Its mechanics are dated (and it shows) and it lacks a Napoleonic panache. Given the current state-of-the-art, BOA is not "art"! However, for the true Napoleonic buff, BOA may be of some entertainment value."

== Reviews ==
- Rating in Computer Gaming World #107
