= Kingdoms of England II: Vikings, Fields of Conquest =

1992 video game

- Developer: Realism Entertainment
- Publisher: Krisalis Software
- Platforms: Amiga, DOS
- Release: 1992
- Genre: Strategy
- Mode: Single-player

Kingdoms of England II: Vikings, Fields of Conquest is a computer game developed by Realism Entertainment in 1992 for the Amiga and DOS. It is a sequel to Kingdoms of England (1989).

== Plot ==
Kingdoms of England II: Vikings, Fields of Conquest is a medieval strategy game that can be played by up to six players who quest to become the new King of England through success on the battlefield against the other players and computer-controlled opponents.

== Gameplay ==
The player's goal in Vikings is to conquer other territories, playing against AI opponents whose goal is the same. Combat in Vikings is not depicted on-screen, rather the player is given the odds of success based upon their circumstances (such as number of troops/morale), from which they may make a decision to leave or fight. Based upon these given odds, the Battle Results screen summarises the outcome of combat, whether land is conquered, and troops on either side may be wounded or dead.

There are eight different types of troops in Vikings: Swordsmen, Archers, Crossbowmen, Pikemen, Knights, Mounted Knights, Champions, and Catapults. Catapults are used to break down a castle's walls before troops invade, and more of the walls being breached reduces the chance of losing troops during a siege.

== Reception ==
Reception

Review scores
Publication	Score
Amiga Power	81% (Amiga)
Dragon	4/5 (MS-DOS)
The One	72% (Amiga)
Amiga Computing	70% (Amiga)
PC Player	59% (DOS)

Brian P. Doud for Computer Gaming World praised the game's multiplayer option and concluded that "Vikings: Fields of Conquest is a challenging strategy game, requiring careful planning and resource management, ideal for those who would be King". The game was reviewed in 1993 in Dragon #192 by Hartley, Patricia, and Kirk Lesser in "The Role of Computers" column. The reviewers gave the game 4 out of 5 stars.

The One gave the Amiga version of Vikings an overall score of 72%, stating that unlike other similar strategy games, Vikings "lacks [aesthetic] frills and sadly there's little feeling of actually being a Viking lord". The One praises a feature where the player may set how many territories must be conquered before the game ends, making the game more approachable for inexperienced players. The One calls the graphics "functional" but criticises the lack of sound, giving the game an N/A score in the sound category. The One also criticises lack of variety in Vikings' gameplay, expressing a desire for "arcade sequences" for relief from Vikings' strategy sections. The One expresses that Vikings is 'unoriginal' and other strategy games outdo it, stating that "Vikings, although initially engrossing, will tend to prove a tad tedious in the longterm. This sort of thing has been done a lot better before, and Vikings doesn't really add anything to the genre."
