= Hammerin' Harry =

1990 video game

- North American arcade flyer of Hammerin' Harry, the first game in the series.
- Genre: Platform
- Developer: Irem
- Publishers: Irem; Atlus

Hammerin' Harry, known in Japan as Daiku no Gen-san (大工の源さん, Carpenter Gen), is a series of platforming video games developed and published by Irem in 1990. The titles were developed and published for the arcades, Famicom, Game Boy, Super Famicom and Sony PSP platforms. The series is centered around the titular Harry (or "Genzo Tamura" in the original Japanese), a hammer-wielding carpenter who protects his hometown of Beranme from the corrupt construction companies that mean to tear it down.

== Games ==
The following is a list of games released in the series.

Japanese title	English title	System	Year
大工の源さん 〜べらんめ町騒動記〜 Daiku no Gen-san: Beranme-chō Sōdōki (Carpenter Gen: Beranme Town Uproar)	Hammerin' Harry	Arcade	1990
大工の源さん; Daiku no Gen-san (Carpenter Gen)	Hammerin' Harry	Famicom	1991
大工の源さん ゴーストビルディングカンパニー; Daiku no Gen-san: Ghost Building Company (Carpenter Gen: Ghost Building Company)	Hammerin' Harry: Ghost Building Company (Europe)/ Carpenter Genzo: Ghost Kingdom (Hong Kong)	Game Boy	1992
大工の源さん2 赤毛のダンの逆襲; Daiku no Gen-san 2: Akage no Dan no Gyakushō (Carpenter Gen 2: Redheaded Dan's Counterattack)	Hammerin' Harry 2: Dan the Red Strikes Back	Famicom	1993
がんばれ！大工の源さん; Ganbare! Daiku no Gen-san (Good Luck! Carpenter Gen)		Super Famicom	1993
大工の源さん ロボット帝国の野望; Daiku no Gen-san: Robot Teikoku no Yabō (Carpenter Gen: The Robot Empire's Ambition)	Carpenter Genzo: Robot Empire (Hong Kong)	Game Boy	1994
大工の源さん カチカチのトンカチがカチ; Daiku no Gen-san: Kachikachi no Tonkachi ga Kachi (Carpenter Gen: The Hardest Hammer Wins)		Game Boy Color	2000
いくぜっ! 源さん 夕焼け大工物語; Ikuze! Gen-san: Yūyake Daiku Monogatari (Let's Go! Gen: Sunset Carpenter Story)	Hammerin' Hero (USA)/GenSan (Europe)	PSP	2008

== Reception ==
The original arcade game received positive reviews from critics. John Cook of CU Amiga gave it a 93% score. Julian Rignall of Computer and Video Games magazine gave it a 91% score. Sinclair User magazine gave it an 87% score.

== Spin-offs and related releases ==
The first spin-off in the series was Kizuchida Quiz da Gen-san Da! (木づちだ クイズだ 源さんだ!, It's a Mallet, It's a Quiz, It's Gen!), a quiz game released for the Game Boy on December 19, 1992, exclusively in Japan. Others were various Japan-only, pachinko machines, as well as home ports of them for PlayStation, PlayStation 2, Windows-operated PCs and Game Boy. Outside of the franchise, Hammerin' Harry was represented in a Japan-only Game Boy title, Shuyaku Sentai Irem Fighter along with three other Irem franchises: R-Type, Ninja Spirit and Battle Chopper. Hammerin' Harry can be seen on the arcade flyers of Ninja Baseball Bat Man, also by Irem.

== Anime ==
An anime series based specifically on the PSP title Hammerin' Hero, titled as Ikuze! Gen-san (いくぜっ!源さん, Let's Go! Gen), aired on GyaO's website in March 24 until June 9, 2008. There were 24 9-minute webisodes aired. A DVD compiling the episodes was released in April 2009.

== Re-Release ==
On April 18th, 2023, Retro-Bit announced the re-release of Hammerin' Harry and Hammerin' Harry 2 as Collector's Edition NES cartridges.
