= Magic Fly (video game) =

1990 video game

- Developer: Electronic Arts
- Publisher: Electronic Arts
- Platforms: Amiga, Atari ST
- Release: 1990

Magic Fly is a video game for the Amiga and Atari ST published by Electronic Arts in 1990.

== Gameplay ==
Magic Fly is a game in which the player pilots a ship inside the tunnels within a gigantic asteroid.

== Reception ==
Allen L. Greenberg reviewed the game for Computer Gaming World, and stated that "Magic Fly is a welcome addition to the small group of science-fiction combat/flight simulators for the Amiga and Atari ST. Its greatest strength lies in the large degree of strategy and exploration present in the game. Graphically, the program offers enough to keep one playing, although it is very much lacking in visual fireworks."

Tom Malcom for Info gave the game 4 stars and stated "Fine stuff; I'll be spending a lot more time with this one."

Damon Howarth for Page 6 described it as "A game that could achieve the same sort of status as Elite."
