= Hammerin' Hero =

2008 video game

- North American cover art
- Developer: Irem
- Publishers: JP: Irem; NA: Atlus; EU: DHM Interactive
- Platform: PlayStation Portable
- Release: JP: May 15, 2008; NA: April 7, 2009; EU: March 26, 2010; PlayStation Network: NA: October 22, 2009
- Genre: Platform
- Modes: Single-player, multiplayer

Hammerin' Hero, known in Japan as Ikuze! Gen-San: Yuuyake Daiku Monogatari (いくぜっ！源さん ～夕焼け大工物語～) and in Europe as GenSan, is a 2008 platform video game for the PlayStation Portable handheld. It is the eighth and final game in the Hammerin' Harry series excluding spin-offs. The game was developed and published by Irem in Japan, while it was later published by Atlus in North America and by DHM Interactive in Europe.

== Reception ==
Reception

Aggregate score
Aggregator	Score
Metacritic	73/100

Review scores
Publication	Score
Destructoid	8/10
GameSpot	6/10
GamesRadar+	3.5/5
GameZone	8.0/10
IGN	8.8/10

Hammerin' Hero received mixed to positive reviews from critics. On Metacritic, the game holds a score of 73/100 based on 19 reviews.

Sam Bishop of IGN gave the game an 8.8/10, praising the gameplay and art style while describing it as "[managing] to not feel old, just... retro". Tom McShea of GameSpot was less receptive to the game, giving it a 6/10 while criticizing its gameplay as being "repetitive" and "formulaic".
