= Hold-And-Modify =

Display mode used in Commodore Amiga computers

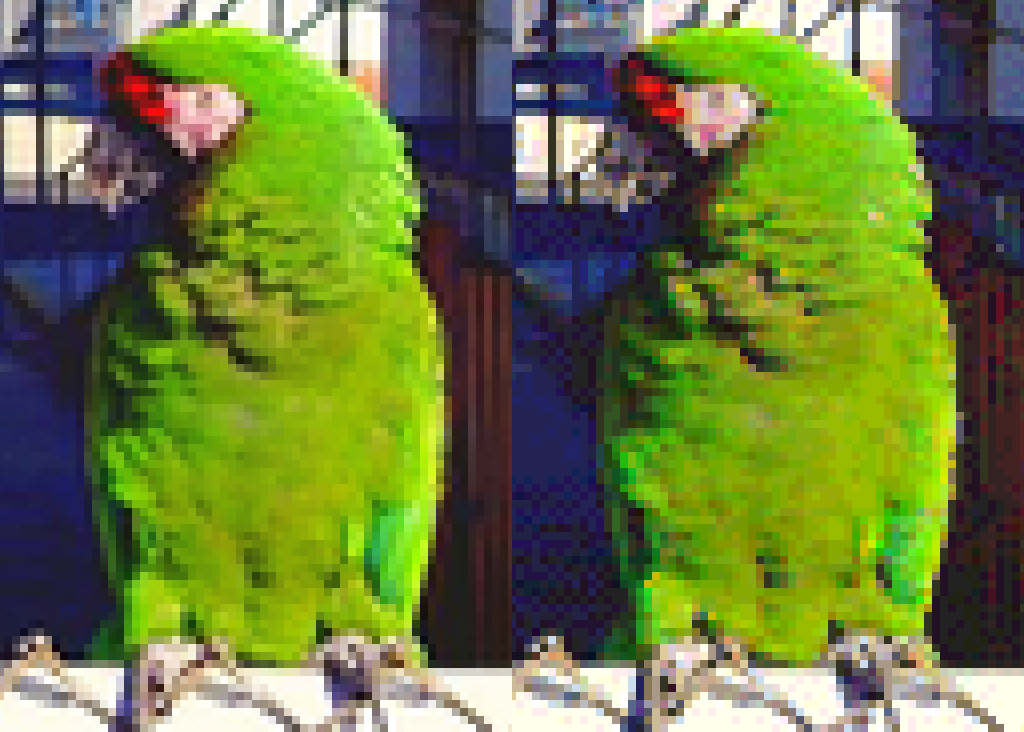
Fragment of full-color image (left) vs Amiga HAM (right)

Hold-And-Modify, usually abbreviated as HAM, is a display mode of the Amiga computer. It uses a highly unusual technique to express the color of pixels, allowing many more colors to appear on screen than would otherwise be possible. HAM mode was commonly used to display digitized photographs or video frames, bitmap art and occasionally animation. At the time of the Amiga's launch in 1985, this near-photorealistic display was unprecedented for a home computer and it was widely used to demonstrate the Amiga's graphical capability. However, HAM has significant technical limitations which prevent it from being used as a general purpose display mode.

== Background ==
The original Amiga chipset uses a planar display with a 12-bit RGB color space that produces 4096 possible colors.

The bitmap of the playfield was held in a section of main memory known as chip RAM, which was shared between the display system and the main CPU. The display system usually used an indexed color system with a color palette.

The hardware contained 32 registers that could be set to any of the 4096 possible colors, and the image could access up to 32 values using 5 bits per pixel. The sixth available bit could be used by a display mode known as Extra Half-Brite which reduced the luminosity of that pixel by half, providing an easy way to produce shadowing effects.

== Hold-And-Modify mode ==
Over-the-air analog color television was designed to solve the problem of sending a color signal over the channel bandwidth assigned for black-and-white signals. It was found that the human visual system is far less sensitive to changes in color than in brightness. Taking advantage of this, the NTSC system slightly reduced the resolution of the black-and-white signal, which became known as the luminance, or luma. The reduction in resolution left a small amount of unused bandwidth which was then used to broadcast a much lower resolution color signal known as chrominance, or chroma. The chroma signal is then further split into two signals, hue and saturation, and the resulting three-part signal is known as HSV, for hue, saturation and value. Just before broadcast, the hue and saturation are further encoded, although the details of these two differ among the different broadcast systems – in NTSC it is known as YIQ, and in PAL it is Y'UV.

In computers and game consoles of the home computer era, which normally used color televisions as computer monitors, the signals inside the computer were normally encoded in HSV. This signal could then be easily turned into YIQ or YUV as needed and then sent to the television using an RF modulator. As the television was receiving a signal that had reduced color resolution, many systems of the era encoded their graphics in a way that also reduced the resolution of the color signal in order to save memory. For instance, the ZX Spectrum stored color only for 8-pixel groups, but this made it difficult to make high-resolution color images due to a problem known as attribute clash.

In the Amiga, the HAM mode was developed as a solution to reducing color resolution memory needs while avoiding attribute clash. In this system, an initial color was set and then the following data was used to modify that value. Normally the data would be used to make adjustments to the luma, producing a higher resolution image based on two colors, like the Spectrum, but this system had no fixed-location edges and the encoding could change the base color anywhere along the line. One could, for instance, set the color of a particular section of a line to "sky blue" and then use the rest of the data for that line to encode changes in brightness, only periodically adjusting luma, to display clouds and similar features. This is the same basic technique used in modern image compression techniques like JPEG and MPEG, as well as in other HSV/YUV based video modes such as the YJK encoding of the V9958 MSX-Video chip (first used in the MSX2+).

As the Amiga design migrated from a games console to a more general purpose home computer, the video chipset was itself changed from HSV to the modern RGB color model. It appeared that this change negated much of the benefit of HAM mode. Amiga project lead Jay Miner relates:

Hold and Modify came from a trip to see flight simulators in action and I had a kind of idea about a primitive type of virtual reality. NTSC on the chip meant you could hold the hue and change the luminance by only altering four bits. When we changed to RGB I said that wasn't needed any more as it wasn't useful and I asked the chip layout guy to take it off. He came back and said that this would either leave a big hole in the middle of the chip or take a three-month redesign and we couldn't do that. I didn't think anyone would use it. I was wrong again as that has really given the Amiga its edge in terms of the color palette.

The final form of Hold-And-Modify was, hardware-wise, functionally the same as the original HSV concept, but instead of operating on those three descriptive components (mostly prioritizing the V component), it modifies one of the three RGB color channels, selected by mask bits. Conversion from HAM to RGB output is achieved in realtime by the display hardware, as the data in the graphics buffer is being displayed. In the HAM6 code for instance, two bits are used to indicate which value was being changed, and another four encoded a value. One of the four possible flag values, zero, indicated that the four data bits were selecting a base color from the value in one of 16 previously-set color registers. It would be possible to use only these types of values, producing a 16-color display using 6-bits-per-pixel. The other three possible patterns, 1 through 3, indicated that the value for the blue, red or green (respectively) value from the original register value should be replaced by the following 4-bit data. The final output values were held in a register in the DAC that produced the final output. Through careful selection of the 16 base colors followed by appropriate modifications, many colors could be displayed in a single image.

HAM can be considered a lossy compression technique, similar in operation and efficiency to JPEG minus the DCT stage; in HAM6 mode, an effective 4096-color (12-bit) playfield is encoded in half the memory that would normally be required – and HAM8 reduces this still further, to roughly 40%. There is, however, a tradeoff for this simplistic compression: a greater overall color fidelity is achieved at the expense of horizontal artifacts, caused by the inability to set any single pixel to an arbitrary 12-bit (or 18 or 24-bits in later models) value. At the extreme, it can take three pixels to change from one color to another, reducing the effective resolution at that point from a "320-pixel" to approximately "106-pixel" mode, and causing smears and shadows to spread along a scanline to the right of a high-contrast feature if the 16 available palette registers prove insufficient.

=== Usage ===
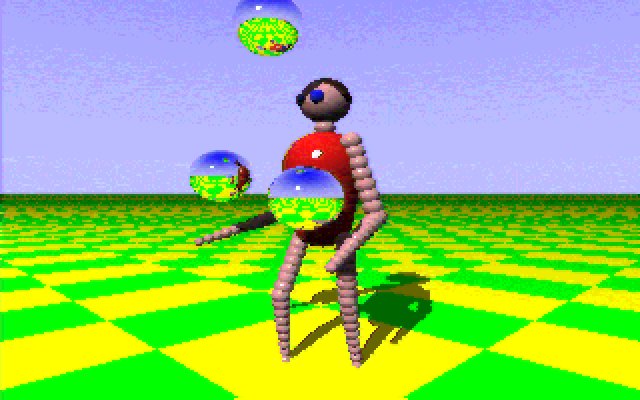
Screenshot of Juggler, a 3D demo released in 1987 using the HAM mode

When the Amiga was launched in 1985, HAM mode offered a significant advantage over competing systems. HAM allows display of all 4096 colors simultaneously, though with the aforementioned limitations. This pseudo-photorealistic display was unprecedented for a home computer of the time and allowed display of digitized photographs and rendered 3D images. In comparison, the then IBM-PC standard EGA allowed 16 on-screen colors from a palette of 64. EGA's successor VGA released in 1987 with its flagship games mode, Mode 13h, allowed 256 on-screen colors from 262,144. HAM mode was frequently used to demonstrate the Amiga's ability in store displays and trade presentations, since competing hardware could not match the color depth. Due to the limitations described above HAM was mainly used for display of static images and developers largely avoided its use with games or applications requiring animation.

HAM mode was only used for gameplay in twelve games, starting with Pioneer Plague in 1988. Other HAM titles include Knights of the Crystallion, Links: The Challenge Of Golf, Overdrive (Infacto), Kang Fu, AMRVoxel, RTG, Zdzislav: Hero Of The Galaxy 3D, OloFight and Genetic Species.

With the introduction of the Advanced Graphics Architecture, a conventional planar image could have a palette of 256 colors, offering significantly higher color fidelity. The original HAM mode, with its limited color resolution, became far less attractive to users of an AGA machine, though it was still included for backward compatibility. The new HAM8 mode was far less useful to the AGA chipset than the HAM mode was to the original chipset, since the more straightforward indexed 256-color (as well as higher performance, planar 128- and 64-color) modes greatly increased the options to the artist without suffering from the drawbacks of HAM. A well-programmed "sliced"-palette mode could prove to be more useful than HAM8, with up to 256 unique colors per line – enough to directly define a distinct color for each pixel if a 256-pixel-wide video mode was defined, and in higher resolutions even a single 256-color palette for the entire screen, let alone each line, allowed much more effective and accurate simulation of higher color depths using dithering than could be achieved with only 32.

The original purpose of HAM, which was to allow more color resolution despite limited video buffer size and limited memory bandwidth, had become largely irrelevant thanks to the lifting of those limits. As more modern computers are inherently capable of high-resolution truecolor displays without any special tricks, there is no longer any need for display techniques like HAM; as PC-style graphics cards offering modes such as 800×600 SVGA in hi-color (16 bpp, or 65536 directly-selectable colors) were already available for the Amiga in the dying days of the platform, it is unlikely that any further developments of the technique would have been bothered with had it survived to the present day.

=== Limitations ===
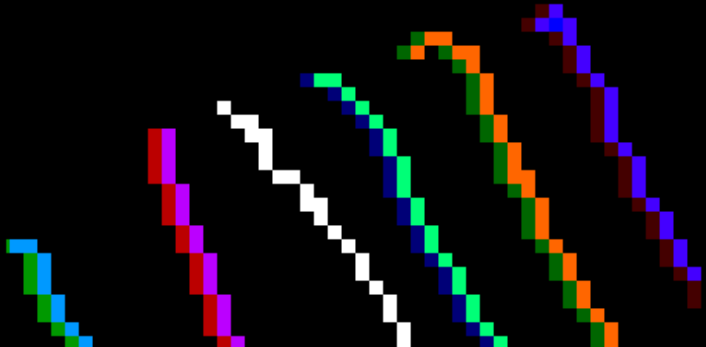
An example of HAM color fringing: white and black are in the palette, the other colors are not, so they require horizontal transition steps.

HAM mode places restrictions on the value of adjacent pixels on each horizontal line of the playfield. In order to render two arbitrary colors adjacently, it may take up to two intermediary pixels to change to the intended color (if the red, green and blue components must all be modified). In the worst case this reduces the horizontal usable chroma resolution in half, from 320~360 pixels to 106~120. Even so, it compares favorably to contemporary video technologies like VHS that has a chroma resolution of around 40 television lines, roughly equivalent to 80 pixels.

Displaying such images over a composite video connection provides some horizontal smoothing that minimizes color artifacts. But if an RGB monitor is used, artifacts become particularly noticeable in areas of sharp contrast (strong horizontal image gradients), where an undesirable multi-hued artifact or "fringe" may appear. Various rendering techniques were used to minimize the impact of "fringing" and HAM displays were often designed to incorporate subtle horizontal color gradients, avoiding vertical edges and contrasts.

Displaying a full color image in HAM mode requires some careful preprocessing. Because HAM can only modify one of the RGB components at a time, rapid color transitions along a scan line may be best achieved by using one of the preset color registers for these transitions. To render an arbitrary image, a programmer may choose to first examine the original image for the most noticeable of these transitions and then assign those colors to one of the registers, a technique known as adaptive palettes. However, with only 16 available registers in the original HAM mode, some loss in color fidelity is common.

Additionally, HAM mode does not easily permit arbitrary animation of the display. For example, if an arbitrary portion of the playfield is to be moved to another on-screen position, the Hold-and-Modify values may have to be recomputed on all source and target lines in order to display the image correctly (an operation not well-suited to animation). Specifically, if the left-most edge of the animated object contains any 'modify' pixels, or if the image immediately to the right of the object contains any 'modify' pixels, then those Hold-and-Modify values must be recomputed. An attempt to move an object around the screen (such as with the use of the blitter) will create noticeable fringing at the left and right borders of that image, unless the graphics are specially designed to avoid this. In order to avoid recomputing Hold-and-Modify values and circumvent fringing, the programmer would have to ensure the left-most pixel of every blitter object and the left-most pixel of every line of a scrolling playfield is a "set" pixel. The palette would have to be designed so that it incorporates every such left-most pixel. Alternatively, a HAM display can be animated by generating pixel values through procedural generation, though this is generally useful for synthetic images only, for example, the "rainbow" effects used in demos.

Note, however, that Hold-and-Modify only applies to playfield pixels. 128 pixels of sprite data (in DMA mode) per scanline are still available for placement on top of the HAM playfield.

== Implementations ==
=== Original Chip Set HAM mode (HAM6) ===
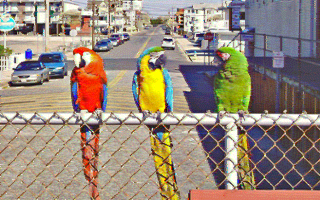
An example of the Commodore Amiga's Hold-And-Modify Mode 6 with 12-bit color depth, 16 base palette colors, and 6 bitplanes (HAM6)

HAM6 mode, named for the 6 bits of data per pixel, was introduced with the Original Chip Set and was retained in the later Enhanced Chip Set and Advanced Graphics Architecture (AGA). HAM6 allows up to 4096 colors to be displayed simultaneously at resolutions from 320×200 to 360×576.

HAM6 encoding uses six bits per pixel: two bits for control and four bits for data. If the two control bits are both set to zero, the four remaining bits are used to index one of the 16 preset color registers, operating in the fashion of a normal indexed bitmap. The other three possible control bit patterns indicate that the color of the previous pixel (to the left) on the scanline should be used and the data bits should instead be used to modify the value of the red, green or blue component. Consequently, there are four possibilities:

Control bits	Data bits	Effect
00	XXXX	Set: Use the 4 bits of data to index a color from the 16 color palette. Use that color for this pixel.
01	BBBB	Modify Blue: Hold the red and green color components of the previous pixel. Use the 4 bits of data as the new blue color component of this pixel.
10	RRRR	Modify Red: Hold the green and blue color components of the previous pixel. Use the 4 bits of data as the new red color component of this pixel.
11	GGGG	Modify Green: Hold the red and blue color components of the previous pixel. Use the 4 bits of data as the new green color component of this pixel.

=== HAM5 ===
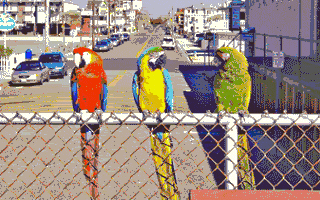
An example of the Commodore Amiga's Hold-And-Modify Mode 5 with 12-bit color depth, 16 base palette colors, and 5 bitplanes (HAM5)

A similar mode, HAM5, is also available where only 5 bits of data per pixel are used. The sixth bit is always zero, so only the blue color component can be modified. Because only the blue component can be modified without a SET command, the effect is limited to moderate increase of the number of yellow-blue color shades displayed. This mode is not as flexible as HAM6 and not widely used.

Control bit	Data bits	Effect
0	XXXX	Set: Use the 4 bits of data to index a color from the 16 color palette. Use that color for this pixel.
1	BBBB	Modify Blue: Hold the red and green color components of the previous pixel. Use the 4 bits of data as the new blue color component of this pixel.

On the AGA chipset, HAM5 no longer exists.

=== HAM4 ===
It's also possible to use HAM mode with 4 bitplanes. Practical use is limited, but this technique was used in demos.

=== HAM7 ===
It is possible to set up HAM mode with 7 bitplanes on OCS/ECS, but that will use only 4 bitplanes. This technique was demonstrated in the “HAM Eager” demo. On the AGA chipset, HAM7 no longer exists.

=== Sliced HAM mode (SHAM) ===
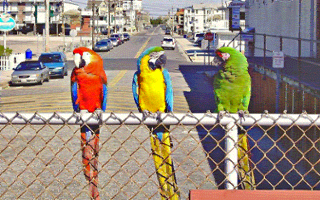
An example of the Commodore Amiga's Hold-And-Modify Mode 6 with different 16 base palette colors per line (SHAM)

The Original Amiga Chipset included a support chip known as the "Copper" that handles interrupts and other timing and housekeeping duties independently of the CPU and the video system. Using the Copper, it is possible to modify chipset registers or interrupt the CPU at any display coordinate synchronously to the video output. This allows programmers to use either Copper-specific code assembled into a Copperlist or CPU code for video effects with very low overhead.

Using this technique, programmers developed the Sliced HAM or SHAM mode, also known as dynamic HAM. SHAM changes some or all color registers on selected scan lines to change the palette during display. This meant that every scan line can have its own set of 16 base colors. This removes some constraints caused by the limited palette, which can then be chosen per-line instead of per-image. The only downsides to this approach are that the Copperlist uses extra clock cycles of chip RAM for the register changes, that the image is not bitmap-only, and the added complexity of setting up the SHAM mode.

This technique is not limited to HAM, and was widely used with the machine's more conventional graphics modes as well. Dynamic HiRes uses a similar palette changing technique to produce 16 colors per line in the high-resolution modes, whereas HAM is limited to low resolution but allows both 16 indexed colors as well as modifications of them.

The SHAM idea was deprecated when HAM8 was introduced with the AGA chipset, since even an unsliced HAM8 image has far more color resolution than a sliced HAM6 image. However, SHAM remains the best available HAM mode on those Amigas with the OCS or ECS chipsets.

=== Advanced Graphics Architecture HAM mode (HAM8) ===
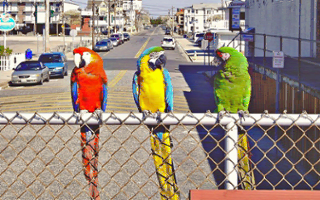
An example of the Commodore Amiga's Hold-And-Modify Mode 8 with 24-bit color depth, 64 base palette colors, and 8 bitplanes (HAM8)

With the release of the Advanced Graphics Architecture (AGA) in 1992, the original HAM mode was renamed "HAM6", and a new "HAM8" mode was introduced (the numbered suffix represents the bitplanes used by the respective HAM mode). With AGA, instead of 4 bits per color component, the Amiga now had up to 8 bits per color component, resulting in 16,777,216 possible colors (24-bit color space).

HAM8 operates in the same way as HAM6, using two "control" bits per pixel, but with six bits of data per pixel instead of four. The set operation selects from a palette of 64 colors instead of 16. The modify operation modifies the six most significant bits of either the red, green or blue color component – the two least significant bits of the color cannot be altered by this operation and remain as set by the most recent set operation.

Control bits	Data bits	Effect
00	XXXXXX	Set: Use the 6 bits of data to index a color from the 64 color palette. Use that color for this pixel.
01	BBBBBB	Modify Blue: Hold the red and green color components of the previous pixel. Use the 6 bits of data as the new blue color component of this pixel.
10	RRRRRR	Modify Red: Hold the green and blue color components of the previous pixel. Use the 6 bits of data as the new red color component of this pixel.
11	GGGGGG	Modify Green: Hold the red and blue color components of the previous pixel. Use the 6 bits of data as the new green color component of this pixel.

Compared to HAM6, HAM8 can display many more on-screen colors. The maximum number of on-screen colors using HAM8 was widely reported to be 262,144 colors (18-bit RGB color space). In fact, the maximum number of unique on-screen colors can be greater than 262,144, depending on the two least significant bits of each color component in the 64 color palette. In theory, all 16.7 million colors could be displayed with a large enough screen and an appropriate base palette, but in practice the limitations in achieving full precision mean that the two least significant bits are typically ignored. In general, the perceived HAM8 color depth is roughly equivalent to a high-color display.

The vertical display resolutions for HAM8 are the same as for HAM6. The horizontal resolution can be 320 (360 with overscan) as before, doubled to 640 (720 with overscan) or even quadrupled to 1280 pixels (1440 with overscan). The AGA chipset also introduced even higher resolutions for the traditional planar display modes. The total number of pixels in a HAM8 image cannot exceed 829,440 (1440×576) using PAL modes but can exceed 1,310,720 (1280×1024) using third-party display hardware (Indivision AGA flicker-fixer).

Like the original HAM mode, a HAM8 screen cannot display any arbitrary color at any arbitrary position, since every pixel relies on either a limited palette or relies on up to two color components of the previous pixel. As with the original HAM mode, designers may also choose to 'slice' the display (see above) in order to circumvent some of these restrictions.

=== HAM emulation ===
HAM is unique to the Amiga and its distinct chipsets. To allow direct rendering of legacy images encoded in HAM format software-based HAM emulators have been developed which do not require the original display hardware. Pre-4.0 versions of AmigaOS can use HAM mode in the presence of the native Amiga chipset. AmigaOS 4.0 and up, designed for radically different hardware, provides HAM emulation for use on modern chunky graphics hardware. Dedicated Amiga emulators running on non-native hardware are able to display HAM mode by emulation of the display hardware. However, since no other computer architecture used the HAM technique, viewing a HAM image on any other architecture requires programmatic interpretation of the image file. Faithful software-based decoding will produce identical results, setting aside variations in color fidelity between display setups.

However, if the goal is merely to display a SHAM image on a non-Amiga platform, the required color values may be pre-calculated based on the palette entries that are programmed via the Copperlist, regardless of whether the palette is modified in the middle of a scanline. It is always possible to up-convert a HAM or SHAM image losslessly to a 32-bit palette.

=== Third-party HAM implementations ===
A device produced by Black Belt known as HAM-E was able to produce images with HAM8 color depth at low horizontal resolution from an Amiga with an Original Chip Set.

The Amiga would be set up to produce high-resolution images (640 pixels wide, 720 with overscan). This required the use of four bitplanes at 70 ns per pixel. The first few lines of the image encoded information to configure the HAM-E unit. Then each pair of pixels was encoded with information for the HAM-E unit, which converted the information into one 140 ns pixel (generating an image 320 pixels wide, or 360 with overscan, at a color depth of eight bitplanes). The quality of HAM-E was thus comparable to a low-resolution HAM8 image. The HAM-E technique exploited the fact that a high-resolution image with four bitplanes delivers a third more memory bandwidth, and therefore a third more data, than a low resolution image with six bitplanes.

The HAM technique was also implemented on the HAM256 and HAM8x1 modes of ULAplus / HAM256 / HAM8x1 for the ZX Spectrum, where it provides the ability to display 256 colors on screen, by modifying a base 64 color palette.

The HAM very similar to the Amiga HAM8 is a part of the HGFX, a planar-based system, provided in the form of the FPGA extension of the original video circuity (ULA), for ZX Spectrum computers. Proposed and tested with the LnxSpectrum emulator as the HGFX/Q, realized in the eLeMeNt ZX computer, in 2021.

== See also ==
- Original Chip Set
- Amiga Halfbrite mode
- Sony ARW 2.0 (ARW 2.0+ raw image files use a similar technique for their lossy delta-compression)
- YJK
- Chroma subsampling
