= Battle Chopper =

1987 video game

- Japanese arcade flyer
- Developer: Irem
- Publisher: Irem
- Composer: Masahiko Ishida
- Platforms: Arcade, Amiga, Commodore 64, Amstrad CPC, ZX Spectrum, Atari ST, PC Engine
- Release: JP/NA: December 1987; EU: 1988
- Genre: Scrolling shooter
- Modes: Single-player, multiplayer

Battle Chopper, released in Japan as Mr. Heli's Great Adventure (Note: Japanese: Mr. Heli の大冒険, Hepburn: Mr. Heli no Daibōken), is a 1987 horizontally scrolling shooter video game developed and published by Irem for arcades. It was released in Japan and North America in December 1987.

== Gameplay ==
Arcade screenshot

Players control a wacky fighter chopper named Mr. Heli, while shooting enemies, collecting power-ups, and defeating bosses to advance levels. Defeating enemies or destroying terrain can yield cash that can be used to purchase power-ups.

== Ports ==
Battle Chopper was ported to the Commodore 64, Amiga, Amstrad CPC, ZX Spectrum, and Atari ST by Firebird, as well as to the PC Engine in Japan by Irem. This version was re-released for the Wii's Virtual Console on March 18, 2008, only in Japan. It came back for the Wii U's Virtual Console on April 15, 2015 in Japan, and was then released for the first time in the United States and Europe on February 1, 2018.

== Reception ==
Reception

Award
Publication	Award
Computer and Video Games	C+VG Hit

In Japan, Game Machine listed Battle Chopper on their January 15, 1988 issue as being the fifth most-successful table arcade unit of the month.

Ciarán Brennan of Your Sinclair magazine reviewed the arcade game, calling it "a lovely little game" that is "very imaginative and beautifully" paced. ACE magazine reviewed the PC Engine version in 1989, rating it 890 out of 1000 and listing it as one of the top five best games available for the console.

== Legacy ==
Mr. Heli later appeared in the Japan-only Game Boy title Shuyaku Sentai Irem Fighter, along with other characters from the game, as well as characters from three other Irem franchises: R-Type, Ninja Spirit and Hammerin' Harry. The game was mentioned in one of the billboards seen in the final stage of Irem's Vigilante and also appeared in R-Type Final as a playable ship.

Battle Chopper has also been noted for inspiring Barunba.
