= John Harris (software developer) =

Computer programmer, hacker and software developer

John D. Harris is a computer programmer, hacker and author of several 1980s Atari computer games. His impact on the early years of the video game industry are chronicled in the book Hackers: Heroes of the Computer Revolution.

His love for the Atari 8-bit computers led him to creating several popular games, perhaps most of all Frogger, which by the end of development had been written from scratch, twice. The reason for this is that his entire back catalogue of development tools and libraries he had developed were stolen at a game developer conference at which he was presenting. The delay in writing the game also led to complications between Harris and his employer, Ken Williams (Director of Sierra On-Line).

During John's time at Sierra, he became one of the most influential young developers in America, at 24 years of age he was earning a 6 figure income off the back of royalties for games which Sierra were marketing for him. As time went on, John's increasingly worrying relationship with Sierra began to get worse, the cutting of royalties and the lack of recognition for his work soon became a catalyst which led to him leaving the company to work at Synapse (despite many offers of employment from new startup EA Games).

== Works ==
=== Atari 8-bit ===
- Jawbreaker, Sierra On-Line, 1981
- Frogger, Sierra On-Line, 1982
- Mouskattack
- Maneuvering
- Bankster
- MAE

=== Atari 2600 ===
- Jawbreaker, Tiger Vision

=== AmigaDE ===
- Gobbler
- Solitaire

== Employment ==
- Pulsar Interactive Corp., 1997–2003
- Tachyon Studios, Inc.
- Atari
- Synapse
- Sierra On-Line
