= Infestation (video game) =

1990 video game

- Publisher: Psygnosis
- Composer: Sean Conran
- Platforms: Amiga, Atari ST, MS-DOS, FM Towns
- Release: EU: 1990
- Genre: Action-adventure
- Mode: Single-player

Infestation is a first-person action-adventure game developed and published by Psygnosis. It was released in 1990 for the Amiga, Atari ST, and MS-DOS. Inspired in part by the films Alien and Aliens, the player must rid a planetoid of insectoid alien life forms.
