= Troika =

Troika or troyka (from Russian тройка, meaning 'a set of three' (trine, trio) or the digit '3') may refer to:

- Troika (driving), a traditional Russian three-horse harness

== Politics ==
- Triumvirate, a political regime ruled or dominated by three powerful individuals, usually troika in the context of the Soviet Union and Russia
- Troika (Bosnia and Herzegovina), a three-party alliance in Bosnia and Herzegovina
- Troika (Soviet leadership), one of the temporary triumvirates in the Soviet Union
- Troika (Tunisia), a three-party alliance that governed Tunisia from 2011 to 2014
- European troika, the decision group formed by the European Commission (EC), the European Central Bank (ECB) and the International Monetary Fund (IMF)
- OSCE troika, the leadership of the Organization for Security and Co-operation in Europe: the chairman-in-office and the previous and incoming chairmen-in-office
- NKVD troika, a commission of three for summary judgment in the Soviet Union during the time of Joseph Stalin
- "The troika" during the U.S. presidency of Ronald Reagan: James Baker, Ed Meese, and Michael Deaver
- Troika of tyranny, a term coined by John Bolton for three Central and South American nations (Cuba, Nicaragua and Venezuela)

== Arts and entertainment ==
=== Literature ===
- The Troika, a 1997 novel by Stepan Chapman
- Troika, a 1979 novel by David Gurr
- Troika, a 2011 novella by Alastair Reynolds
- Troika, the fourth novel of the Indigo Saga by Louise Cooper

=== Music ===
- "Troika", the first movement of The Blizzard suite by Georgy Sviridov (1974, movie version — 1964)
- Troika (Julia Kogan album), 2011
- Troika (D'Virgilio, Morse & Jennings album), 2022
- "Troika", the fourth movement of Suite from Lieutenant Kijé by Prokofiev
- "Troika", the eleventh movement of The Seasons by Tchaikovsky

=== Other uses in arts and entertainment ===
- Troika (video game), a 1991 video game
- Troika! (role-playing game), a 2019 tabletop role-playing game
  - The fictional city in the Troika! RPG
- Troika, a painting by Vasily Perov
- Troika (series), a 2010 Israeli-Russian short TV series by Leonid Prudovsky
- Troyka, a British jazz band featuring pianist Kit Downes
- Troika (1930 film), a German drama film
- Troika (1969 film), an American experimental comedy film by Fredric Hobbs
- Troyca, a Japanese animation studio

== Businesses ==
- Troika Games, a video games developer 1998–2005
- Troika Pottery, a Cornish pottery company 1963–1983
- Troika Dialog, the former name of Sberbank CIB, a multinational investment banking and asset management firm

== Other uses ==
- Troika card, a contactless reusable card designed to pay for public transport in Moscow, Russia
- Troika (chocolate), a confection by Nidar AS, Norway
- Troika (crater), on Mars
- Troika (dance), a Russian folk-style performance dance
- Troika laundromat, Russian international money laundering scheme
- Troika (ride), an amusement park ride
- The Troika (Kuala Lumpur), a condominium in Kuala Lumpur, Malaysia
- VAZ-2103, a Soviet sedan car nicknamed Troika

== See also ==
- Trojka (disambiguation)
- Three of a kind (disambiguation)
- Threesome (disambiguation)
- Troyca, a Japanese animation studio
