= Antony Davies =

American economist, speaker, and author

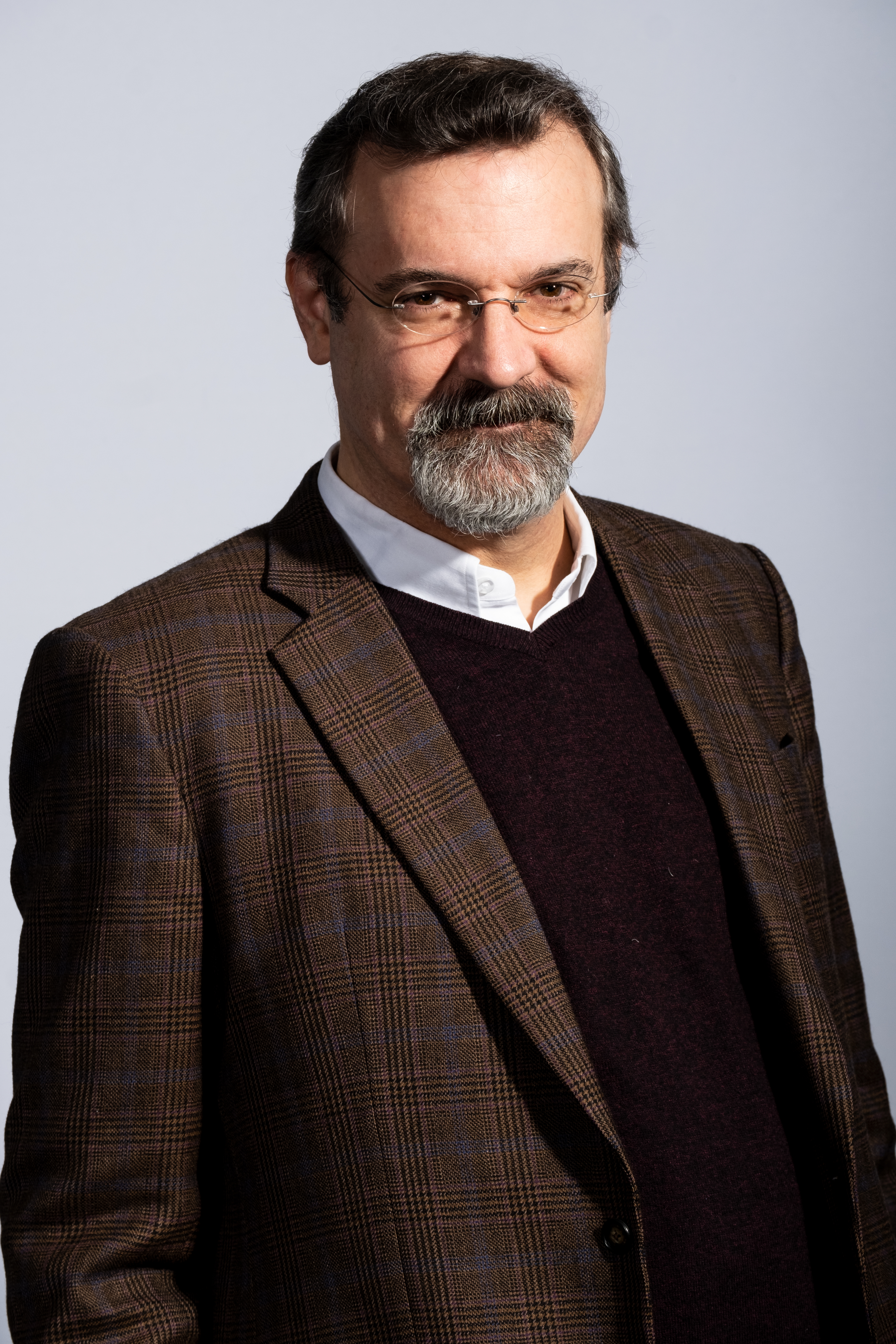
- Born: Savannah, Georgia

Academic background
- Education: Saint Vincent College; University at Albany

Academic work
- Discipline: Economics; Econometrics
- School or tradition: Neoclassical economics Free Market
- Institutions: Foundation for Economic Education; West Virginia University; Duquesne University

Antony Davies (born 4 April 1965) is an American economist, speaker, and author. He is an associate professor of economics at Duquesne University and the Milton Friedman Distinguished Fellow at the Foundation for Economic Education.

== Early life and education ==
Davies was born in Savannah, Georgia, to Alan and Margaret Davies. He was raised in Montoursville, Pennsylvania, and graduated from Bishop Neumann High School in Williamsport, Pennsylvania in 1983. Starting at an early age, he acted with the Community Theatre League. He graduated cum laude with a B.S. degree in economics with minors in mathematics and philosophy from Saint Vincent College in 1987.

In 1994, he received his Ph.D. in economics from the University at Albany in Albany, New York, where he studied under Kajal Lahiri. His Ph.D. thesis addressed analysis of multi-dimensional panel data in econometrics, and it received the Distinguished Dissertation Award.

== Professional history ==
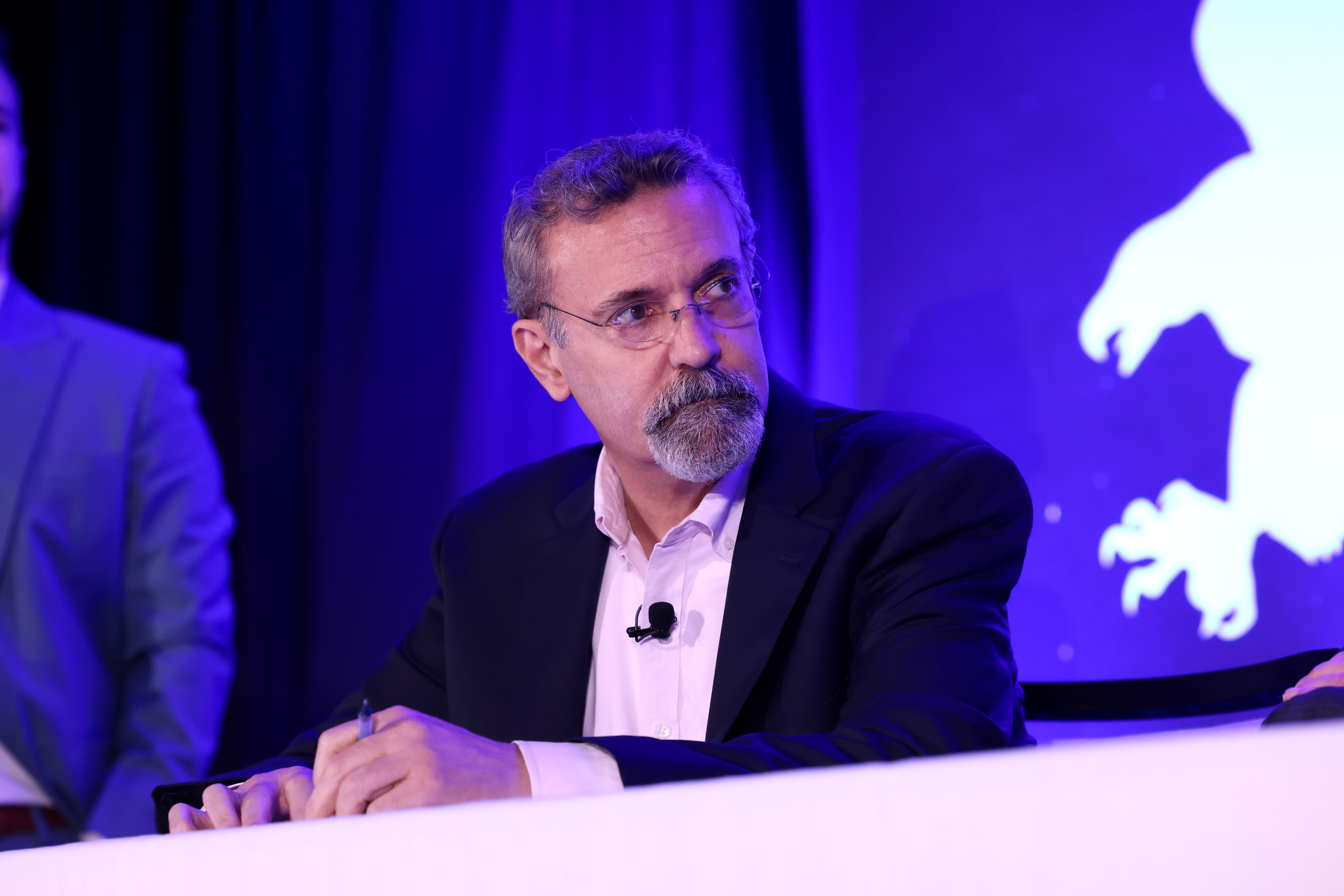
Davies speaking with attendees at the 2025 Washington, D.C. Young Americans for Liberty Spring YALCON Series at the Sheraton Reston Hotel in Reston, Virginia

While a college student, he founded Paragon Software with Mark E. Seremet. Davies's first faculty appointment was at West Virginia Wesleyan College, after which he moved on to West Virginia University where he taught econometrics. During the dot-com era, he left academia to serve as Chief Financial Officer and Chief Analytics Officer at Parabon Computation, where he was co-inventor on a patent for generating supercomputing power from idle Internet-connected computers. In 2001, he joined the faculty at Duquesne University where he helped design the economics major.

In 2006, he co-founded an Internet discovery firm, Repliqa, that was purchased by indiePub Entertainment. In 2007, he was named a Mercatus Affiliated Senior Scholar and, in 2015, a Strata Research Fellow. He conducts research on the economic effects of government policy. As a Mercatus Scholar, Davies has given lectures on economic policy topics for staff at the U.S. House of Representatives.

Starting in 2012, he produced a series of videos on economics and statistics for the Institute for Humane Studies, the Foundation for Economic Education, and Certell. In 2015, he worked as associate producer for the Moving Picture Institute on their video series, FI$H: How An Economy Grows. Davies is a long-time faculty member at the Institute for Humane Studies and the Foundation for Economic Education.

Davies has published op-eds in newspapers and magazines throughout the country including the Wall Street Journal, Los Angeles Times, New York Daily News, Forbes, Investors Business Daily, and CNN.com. In addition, Davies co-authors a regular monthly column in the Pittsburgh Tribune-Review, and has co-authored a college-level economics text published by Cognella. He is also a regular commentator on The Blaze TV.

== Books ==
- LeBar, M., A. Davies, D. Schmidtz, eds., 2015. Equality and Public Policy, Cambridge University Press.
- Tosun, M., P. Yakovlev, and A. Davies, 2015. Principles of Microeconomics, Cognella Publishing.
- Davies, A. and J.R. Harrigan, 2020. Cooperation and Coercion: How busybodies became busybullies and what that means for economics and politics. Intercollegiate Studies Institute. {ISBN 978-1610171564}
