= Advanced Fighting Fantasy =

Tabletop role-playing game

- Cover of Dungeoneer
- Years active: 1989 (AFF 1st ed.), 2011 (AFF 2nd ed.)
- Genres: fantasy tabletop roleplaying game
- Chance: six-sided dice
- Skills: storytelling, roleplay, imagination

Advanced Fighting Fantasy (AFF) is a British roleplaying game based on the Fighting Fantasy and Sorcery! gamebooks, first published in 1989. Just as the gamebooks, AFF is set in the world of Titan. A second edition of AFF was published in 2011.

AFF is chiefly meant to facilitate the games master to write their own adventures inspired by Fighting Fantasy. The few adventures published for the game are brand new adventures specifically written for the system as opposed to converting existing gamebook stories for multiplayer RPG usage.

AFF is unrelated to both the Myriador d20 conversions of several gamebooks by Jamie Wallis, and the electronic conversions of the Sorcery! series by inkle. Both of these feature unique rules not seen elsewhere in the Fighting Fantasy brand.

== The game mechanics ==
The rules of AFF are adapted from the rules of the Fighting Fantasy gamebooks and was an expanded but separate follow-up to Fighting Fantasy – The Introductory Role-Playing Game. This system is based on skills, here called "Special Skills". The game features neither classes nor levels.

A player character, called Hero, is defined by:

- four characteristics: Skill, Stamina, Luck, Magic; they range from 7 to 12 except for Stamina which ranges 14-24;
- race: Human, Dwarf, Elf;
- a set of special skills: Combat, Movement, Stealth, Knowledge and Magical special skills; special skill values usually range from 0 to 4;
- a few Talents, which are special features such as Animalfriend, Natural Mage, Robust, Weaponmaster...
- a Social Class, from 0 (beggar, criminal) to 10 (king).

The creation of a Hero starts with the choice of a "concept", e.g. a Knight of Salamonis or a Student from the magical school of Yore — this has no influence on the attributes and is more a background guideline. Unlike the gamebooks, the characteristics and special skills are not rolled but are bought with creation points. The rules provide archetypes which allow a fast creation: Adventurer, Archer, Barbarian, Priest of Telak, Rogue, Warrior, Wizard...

There are three types of tests:

- unopposed test: a roll of two six-sided dice (2d6) must be less than the sum of a characteristic (usually Skill, sometimes Magic) and a special skill; this is an extension of the Skill tests of the gamebooks;
- opposed tests: each character roll 2d6 and adds Skill and a special skill, the highest wins; this is an extension of the combat procedure of the gamebooks;
- Luck test: same as the gamebooks rule.

The rules provide difficulty adjustments for given situations (e.g. -5 to the Climbing special skill when wearing a plate armour).

The combat rules are the same as the gamebooks', except that the points of damage (Stamina loss) are determined randomly: the attacker rolls 1d6 and reads the points of damage on a table (one for each weapon), the defender does the same to apply the damage reduction from his armour. There are a few combat options: Luck test to increase or reduce the damages, surprise, feint...

A spellcaster must have a least 1 in the Magic characteristic and one point in one special skill: Magic-Minor, Magic-Priestly, Magic-Sorcery or Magic-Wizardry. There are three types of magic:

- Minor magic: the Cantrips are easy-to-cast spells with limited effects;
- Religion: each god bestows his priests three general powers (the same three for all his priests) and one specific power;
- Sorcery: this type of magic was created in the Old World, and does not draw its energy from the surrounding environment but from the sorcerer's own Stamina, and from material components; this is the adaptation of the magic system of the Sorcery! gamebooks;
- Wizardry: the Wizard studied in a school to learn to use the invisible arcane power that permeates the world of Titan.

== The Advanced Fighting Fantasy system (original publication) ==
| Title | Authors | Cover Art | Interior Art | Published | ISBN |
|---|---|---|---|---|---|
| Dungeoneer | Marc Gascoigne & Pete Tamlyn | John Sibbick | John Sibbick | 1989 | 0-14-032936-6 |
| Blacksand! | Marc Gascoigne & Pete Tamlyn | John Sibbick | Russ Nicholson | 1990 | 0-14-034396-2 |
| Allansia | Marc Gascoigne & Pete Tamlyn | John Sibbick | Russ Nicholson | 1994 | 0-14-036051-4 |

== Advanced Fighting Fantasy titles published by Arion Games (2011-present) ==
The main change brought by this edition is the addition of the Sorcery! magic system. Arion Games also brought in several titles not previously directly related to AFF (as opposed to FF in general) under the Advanced Fighting Fantasy brand.

For Out of the Pit, Arion added the statistics needed to make that monster book compatible with AFF rules. The spells in the Sorcery! spell book were likewise given additional mechanics to make them AFF spells. Other publications, such as the Titan worldbook, was republished as-is (with no system specific info).

| No. | Title | Authors | Cover Art | Interior Art | Published | ISBN |
|---|---|---|---|---|---|---|
| CB77001 | Advanced Fighting Fantasy | Graham Bottley | John Sibbick | Various | 2011 | 978-0-85744-067-9 |
| CB77002 | Out of the Pit | Steve Jackson & Ian Livingstone (Edited by Marc Gascoigne) | Christos Achilleos | Various | 2011 | 978-0-85744-068-6 |
| CB77003 | Titan | Steve Jackson & Ian Livingstone (Edited by Marc Gascoigne) | John Christos Achilleos | Various | 2011 | 978-0-85744-069-3 |
| CB77004 | Crown of Kings | Graham Bottley & Steve Jackson | John Blanche | John Blanche | 2012 | 978-0-85744-121-8 |
| CB77005 | Heroes Companion | Graham Bottley | John Sibbick | Russ Nicholson | 2012 | 978-0-85744-157-7 |
| CB77006 | Blacksand | Graham Bottley | Martin McKenna | Iain McCaig and Steve Luxton | 2012 | 978-0-85744-184-3 |
| CB77007 | The Sorcery Spell Book | Graham Bottley & Steve Jackson | Maggie Kneen | John Blanche | 2013 | None |
| CB77008 | Beyond the Pit | Andrew Wright | Terry Oakes | Various | 2013 | 978-0-85744-121-8 |
| CB77009 | The Warlock of Firetop Mountain | Brett Schofield | Martin McKenna | Russ Nicholson and Brett Schofield | 2014 | None |
| CB77010 | Advanced Fighting Fantasy Deluxe | Graham Bottley, Marc Gascoigne, Peter Temlyn | John Sibbick | Various | 2016 | None |
| CB77011 | Stellar Adventures | Graham Bottley & Jonathan Hicks | Alan Craddock | Gary Mayes & Mark Robinson | 2017 | None |
| CB77012 | Stellar Adventures Starship Catalogue | Graham Bottley, Dan Quinlan, Simon Strafford | Graham Bottley | Graham Bottley | 2017 | None |
| CB77013 | The Titan Herbal | Andrew Wright | Maggie Kneen | Various | 2017 | None |
| CB77014 | The Kaladarian Response | Graham Bottley | Graham Bottley? | Gary Mayes & Mark Robinson | 2018 | None |
| CB77015 | Demons of Doom | Graham Bottley | Tony Hough | Various | 2019 | None |
| CB77016 | A Rough Guide to the Pit | Andrew Wright | Mike Tenebrae | Various | 2019 | None |
| CB77017 | Weapons and Armour Catalogue | Graham Bottley, Dan Quinlan, Simon Strafford | Graham Bottley | Graham Bottley | 2019 | None |
| CB77018 | Travels in Arion | Graham Bottley | Bob Greyvenstein | Russ Nicholson & Maciej Zagorski | 2019 | None |
| CB77019 | Return to the Pit | Andrew Wright | Les Edwards | Various | 2019 | None |
| CB77020 | Creatures of Mishna | Benjamin Quinton-Bottley | | Various | 2020 | None |
| CB77021 | Combat Companion | Graham Bottley | | Various | 2021 | None |
| CB77022 | Citadel of Chaos | Brett Schofield | Henrik Karppinen | Russ Nicholson | 2022 | None |
| CB77023 | Encyclopedia Arcana Vol I - Treasures | Andrew Wright | John Blanche | Various | 2022 | None |
| CB77024 | Heroes of Titan | Andrew Wright | John Kapsalis | John Kapsalis | 2023 | None |
| CB77025 | The Atlantis Campaign | Graham Bottley | Various | Various | 2023 | None |
| CB77026 | Adventure Creation System | Graham Bottley, Stuart Lloyd, Daniel Quinlan | Various | Various | 2024 | None |
| CB77027 | The Forest of Doom | Brett Schofield | Various | Various | 2024 | None |

== Translations ==
The roleplaying game is translated and published in French by Scriptarium, as Défis fantastiques, le jeu de rôle (DF-JdR). They added original material: the core book has a 100 pages additional campaign, Le Tambour de Gondrim (The Drum of Gondrim), and original illustrations. They also created a gamemaster's screen with an original adventure, and paper figurines, floorplans and tiles.

- Bottley, Graham; Jackson, Steve; Livingstone, Ian (2013). Défis fantastiques, le jeu de rôle [Advanced Fighting Fantasy] (in French). Scriptarium. ISBN 978-2-9543631-0-3.
- Monseur, Olivier (2013). L'Écran du meneur de jeu. Illustrated by Jidus and Russ Nicholson. Scriptarium. ISBN 978-2-9543631-2-7. Gamemaster's screen and an adventure, Pirates à la dérive (Adrift Pirates), first part of the campaign Maudit Trésor... (Wicked Treasure...).
- Les accessoires du meneur de jeu. Illustrated by Éric Chaussin and Jidus. Scriptarium. 2013. ISBN 978-2-95436-310-3. Tiles and paper figurines.
- Carte d'Allansia. Cartography by Florent Haro, illustrated by Jidus. Scriptarium. 2013. A2 vinyl colour map of Allansia, from the original material from Jonathan Green, Steve Jackson and Ian Livingstone.
- Pouillot, Fabrice "del Armgo" (2013). Tel est pris. Scriptarium. Free downloadable adventure, first part of the campaign Les Larmes de Hmurresh (The Tears of Hmurresh).
- Baldowski, Paul (2013). La Fosse aux ordures [The Pit of Filth] (in French). Scriptarium. Free downloadable adventure in a contemporary world (see the original version).

Scriptarium started a call for crowdfunding to publish the translation of Titan in March 2014. The success of the subscription allowed the execution of new original illustrations (by John Sibbick, Malcolm Barter, Bill Houston, and maps by Steve Luxton), illustrated cards for the magic spells (playing cards format), a miniature representing Yaztromo, and an A2-format colour map of Titan showing the location of the adventures (gamebooks and romans). It also contains an original 90 p. campaign, À la Recherche de la jeunesse perdue (In Search of Lost Youth).

== Derived systems ==
- Troika! uses a system heavily influenced by Advanced Fighting Fantasy
