= Glyn Williams =

Glyn Williams may refer to:

- Glyndwr Williams (1932–2022), professor of history at Queen Mary, University of London
- Glyn Williams (footballer) (1918–2011), Welsh footballer
- Glyn Williams, developer of Warhead
