= Wizard Wars =

Wizard Wars may refer to:

- Wizard Wars (TV series), a magician reality show
- Wizard Wars (video game), a 1988 video game
- Wizard Warz, a 1987 video game
- Wizard Wars, a mod for the video game Half-Life, see List of GoldSrc mods
