= MegaTraveller 2: Quest for the Ancients =

1991 video game

- Developer: Paragon Software
- Publisher: Paragon Software
- Designers: Marc Miller, Glenn Dill, F.J. Lennon
- Programmers: Glenn Dill, Charles Griffith
- Writer: F.J. Lennon
- Composer: Michael Powell
- Platforms: MS-DOS and Amiga
- Release: 1991; 35 years ago
- Genre: Role-playing video game
- Mode: Single player

MegaTraveller 2: Quest for the Ancients is a 1991 space science fiction role-playing video game produced by Game Designers' Workshop licensee Paragon Software and distributed by MicroProse and Empire Software. It is the sequel to MegaTraveller 1: The Zhodani Conspiracy. Designed by Marc Miller, an original creator of the Traveller series, the game is set within the Official Traveller Universe and features a character creation system and other elements of game mechanics compatible with previous Traveller products. The game's plot centers on finding a way to stop the flow of slime issuing from an ancient ruin on the planet Rhylanor before it inundates the entire world. Gameplay involves controlling a party of up to five adventurers who engage in real-time exploration, trading, interaction with non-player characters, combat and problem solving on the surface of over a hundred planets and in spaceships journeying between these worlds.

== Plot ==
The game's introduction features a home video shot by a tourist on Rhylanor while on a guided tour of an ancient ruin built by an extinct race of advanced beings known as the Ancients. It shows two mysterious individuals entering the ruin and activating enigmatic machinery which proceeds to emit a torrent of slime threatening to flood the entire planet within seven years. In an effort to encourage prospective adventurers to stop the deluge, the Duke of Rhylanor offers a reward of 500 million credits to anyone who can save the planet. A second reward is available to anyone who can identify the perpetrators responsible for activating the machinery. The producer of this video along with a few friends decide to work together as a party of adventurers to unravel the mystery of the Ancients, bring the perpetrators to justice, thwart the impending disaster on Rhylanor, and earn these rewards.

== Gameplay ==
Before starting a new game, the player must assemble a party consisting of up to five characters. A pre-generated team is available for quick access to the game, but it is also possible to use MegaTraveller's detailed character creation system to control the attributes, skills and inventory items with which the party members begin the game. Character creation involves generating a character with randomly assigned attributes and subsequently guiding that individual through one of over two dozen available careers to build up his or her skills and possessions. When characters retire or "muster out" from their career, they are added to the pool of available members from which the party of adventurers is selected by the player. The skills they possess at the start of the game may be enhanced later on through repeated use or by paying for training.

Once a party has been outfitted, it begins the game in a city on the planet Rhylanor. The player sees the city from an overhead perspective with various symbols denoting the buildings the party may visit. The party may also travel to other cities or even traverse the planet's surface outside of the cities. Players issue commands via hotkeys or clickable icons to direct party members to move around the planet's surface, interact with non-player characters, engage in combat, use items and enter buildings. When the party is issued certain commands, the member whose attributes and skills best qualify him or her to perform it automatically volunteers. The player may override the automated selections made by this "PAL system" and choose another member instead to perform the assigned task.

Travel to other planets is accomplished by either purchasing a ticket aboard an interstellar passenger liner or by boarding a private spaceship (if a member of the party happens to own one). Ownership of a spaceship also provides the party an opportunity to earn money by trading various commodities between planets or by attacking other spaceships for the purpose of stealing their cargo. Three classes of spaceship are available for the party to use in the game, including a derelict, but repairable, vessel constructed by the Ancients. Once the party has arrived on another planet, it may disembark and explore that world's cities and terrain. Although all cities feature the same basic layout, the number of accessible buildings varies from one city to another. On some planets, the party has the opportunity to explore a ruin built by the Ancients for items that may mitigate the crisis on Rhylanor.

Gameplay is nonlinear; the player has the freedom to pursue various paths to gather clues and obtain the means necessary to resolve the crisis on Rhylanor. Woven into this overarching theme, the game also includes numerous subplots which afford the player opportunities for earning money, obtaining items, and locating Ancient ruins and artifacts. However, the player is constrained by a strict time limit of seven years in which to complete the main plot and thereby thwart the crisis on Rhylanor before the planet is completely inundated.

== Development ==
Marc Miller was approached by Paragon Software to develop a game scenario set within the Official Traveller Universe. In response, he composed a brief plot sketch describing an Ancient ruin running amok and threatening to destroy a planet. He envisioned that the player will have to seek clues in other sites constructed by the Ancients and ultimately learn their secret to resolve the crisis and win the game. As Paragon developed a game around this scenario, Miller continued to offer his co-operation and provided Paragon's staff with numerous design guidelines which were incorporated into the finished product.

== Reception ==
Computer Gaming World's Scorpia in 1992 commended MegaTraveller 2's intuitive user interface, the nonlinear plot structure, and general improvements in the game over its predecessor. However, she added that the "game is a boring implementation of an interesting story, complicated by too many side threads that have nothing to do with the main plot" and that "the long list of character skills is mainly useless, except for creating characters for the pencil-and-paper version of MegaTraveller." In 1993 Scorpia said that the game improved on its predecessor, "although not by much", with better combat not compensating for "the game becom[ing] mechanical and tedious".

The Amiga version of MegaTraveller 2 was reviewed in a number of magazines focused on Amiga gaming. Reviewer Khalid Howlader lamented the poor quality of the Amiga version's graphics and its long disk access times in a review published in The One Amiga. He assigned the game a rating of 57%. But in a review published in Amiga Computing, reviewer Stevie Kennedy praised the fact that this lengthy and "addictive" role-playing game will keep fans of the genre "going for months" and gave it a rating of 85%.

== See also ==
- Marc W. Miller
- MegaTraveller 1: The Zhodani Conspiracy
- Paragon Software
- Traveller (role-playing game)
