= Black Madonna (novel) =

1996 novel by Carl Sargent and Marc Gascoigne

Black Madonna is a novel by Carl Sargent and Marc Gascoigne published by Roc Fantasy in 1996.

== Plot summary ==
Black Madonna is a Shadowrun novel featuring the characters Sutherland, Serrin and Geraint in their third novel.

== Reception ==
Andy Butcher reviewed Black Madonna for Arcane magazine, rating it a 6 out of 10 overall. Butcher comments that "Black Madonna is a cut above the Shadowrun novels from other authors in terms of its characters. But it also suffers from the overly intricate plotting of the earlier stories."

== Review ==
- Australian Realms #28
