= Twilight's Ransom =

1988 video game

- Developer: Paragon Software
- Publisher: Paragon Software
- Platforms: Amiga, Apple II, Atari ST, Commodore 64, MS-DOS
- Release: 1988

Twilight's Ransom is a 1988 video game published by Paragon Software.

== Gameplay ==
Twilight's Ransom is a game in which the player has twelve hours to rescue a kidnapped woman in Liberty City.

== Reception ==
Dennis Owens reviewed the game for Computer Gaming World, and stated that "As long as one recognizes that Twilight's Ransom is actually more of a serious text game than a graphic presentation, one should consider purchasing it. It certainly has the capacity to keep you entertained."
