= XF5700 Mantis Experimental Fighter =

1992 video game

- Developer: Paragon Software
- Publisher: MicroProse
- Designers: Mark E. Seremet; Paul M. Conklin; Glenn A. Dill
- Programmers: Glenn A. Dill; Christopher Short
- Artist: Quinno Martin
- Composer: Michael Bross
- Platform: MS-DOS
- Release: 1992
- Genre: Space combat simulator
- Mode: Single-player

XF5700 Mantis Experimental Fighter is a space combat simulator developed by Paragon Software and published by MicroProse under their Microplay Software label for MS-DOS in 1992.

== Gameplay ==
Using what was dubbed "real physics", the XF5700 Mantis attempts to simulate space physics otherwise known as Newtonian physics. If the thrust is hit, the craft will glide through space (like a boat through water) and will not change directions readily like in other space sims. The game's artificial intelligence is faulty at times, Sirian craft could always target the player and plot a suicide course against the player rather than trying to kill the wingmates. Some missions tend to be repetitive. Later on, a digitized speechpack upgrade was released.

Later on a CD-ROM version was released, containing (very early) video-captured sequences, the speech pack, numerous new animated cutscenes and an extra campaign, where you fought a new alien race called the "rexum".

== Plot ==
Based on Warhead by Glyn Williams, Mantis takes the plot further by using 90 missions. In what is possibly a rewrite of Williams's game, the invasion by the Sirian aliens (now dubbed "Sirians") takes place on March 16, 2094, leaving 3 billion humans dead. Earth was unprepared for the attack due to a recent war in the Middle East (Eurisian War) that took place thus exhausting the resources for defense against aliens. After Earth was devastated, the governments were dissolved in favor of a unified power called the Fist of Earth. FOE is Earth's final hope to eliminate the Sirian threat. FOE's defenses is SolBase and the XF5700 Mantis. "Viper" (the player) is a Mantis pilot who was enlisted by FOE to fight the Sirians.

The aliens, which are now called "Sirians", are bug-like creatures which look like giant cockroaches, but have a strong collective group mind using telepathic messages when in groups. At first the Sirians were tiny "roaches" on their home planet, but as time passed, they evolved and eventually took over the dominant race on the planet Siria, wiped them out, and assimilated their technology. Siria later became uninhabitable. Sirians need vertebrate creatures in which to lay eggs to produces new Sirians; this is why the Sirians targeted Earth after searching for a new home planet.

== Reception ==
Reception

Review score
Publication	Score
Computer Gaming World	2/5

Citing the claims on the game's packaging, Computer Gaming World stated that "Mantis is neither a successor to that 'other' space adventure nor is it an 'Ultra-realistic space flight simulation' ... The flight model is weak, the action limited, and overall gameplay, poor ... a null game." A 1994 survey of strategic space games set in the year 2000 and later gave the game two stars out of five, stating that "it accomplished its mission adequately, but without style".
