= Polskie Radio Program III =

Polish national radio station

Polskie Radio Program III (PR3)

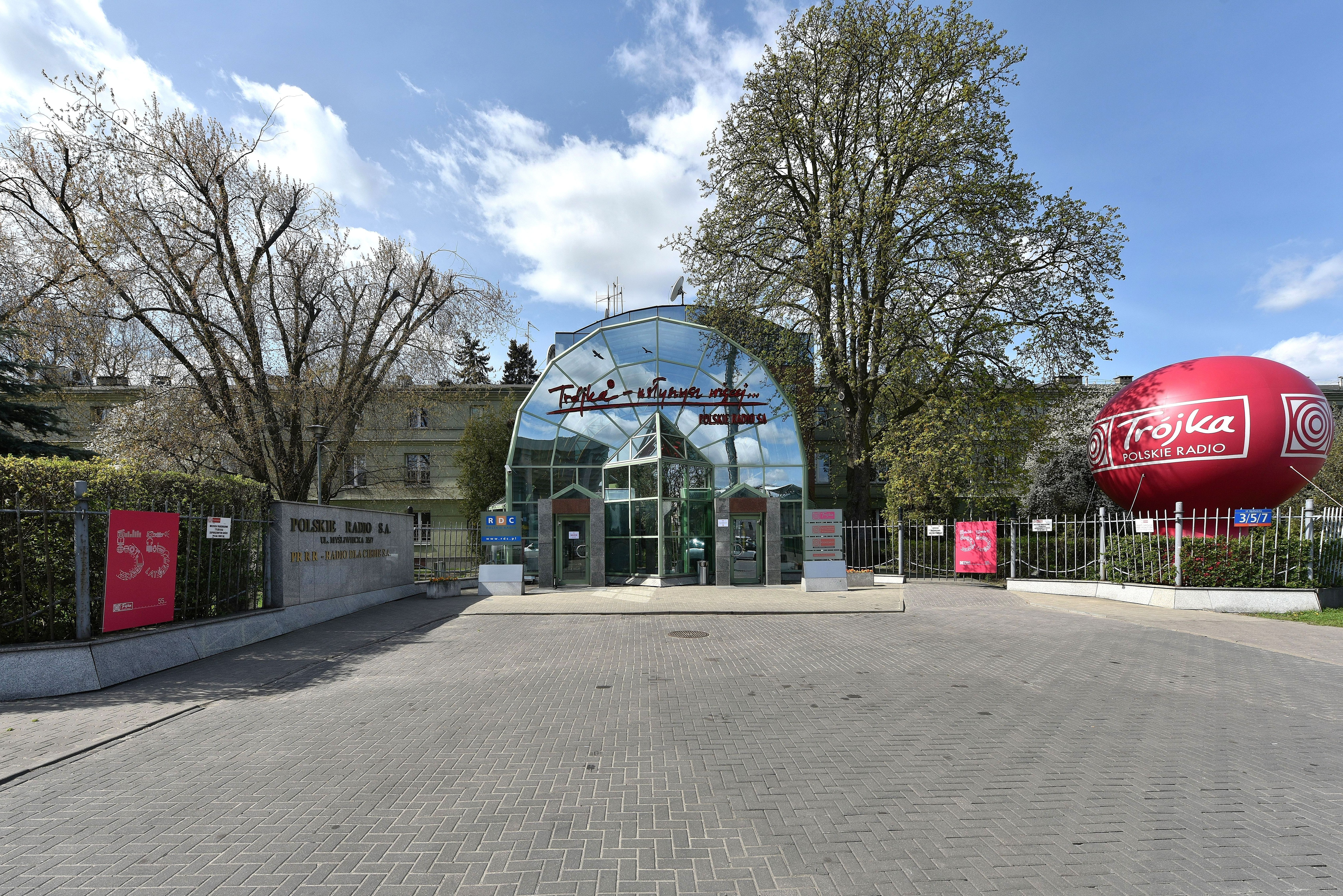
- Warsaw; Poland
- Broadcast area: Poland: Nationally on analogue FM, digital DAB+ & via online streaming Internationally: United States: DirecTV; Canada: Bell Satellite TV
- Frequencies: FM: check on polskieradio.pl (Poland); DirecTV (USA): 2175; Bell Satellite TV (Canada): 988
- Branding: Trójka (Three)

Programming
- Language: Polish
- Format: Indie-pop

Ownership
- Owner: Polskie Radio
- Sister stations: Jedynka; Dwójka; Czwórka

History
- First air date: 1 April 1962; 64 years ago

Links
- Webcast: Live Stream
- Website: trojka.polskieradio.pl

Polskie Radio Program III (Polish Radio Three), known also as Radiowa Trójka or shortly Trójka is a radio channel broadcast by the Polish public broadcaster, Polskie Radio. It is a music station playing a wide variety of music from rock, alternative, jazz and others. It is broadcast on FM, via satellite and online. The studios are located at Myśliwiecka Street 3/5/7 in Warsaw.

== History ==
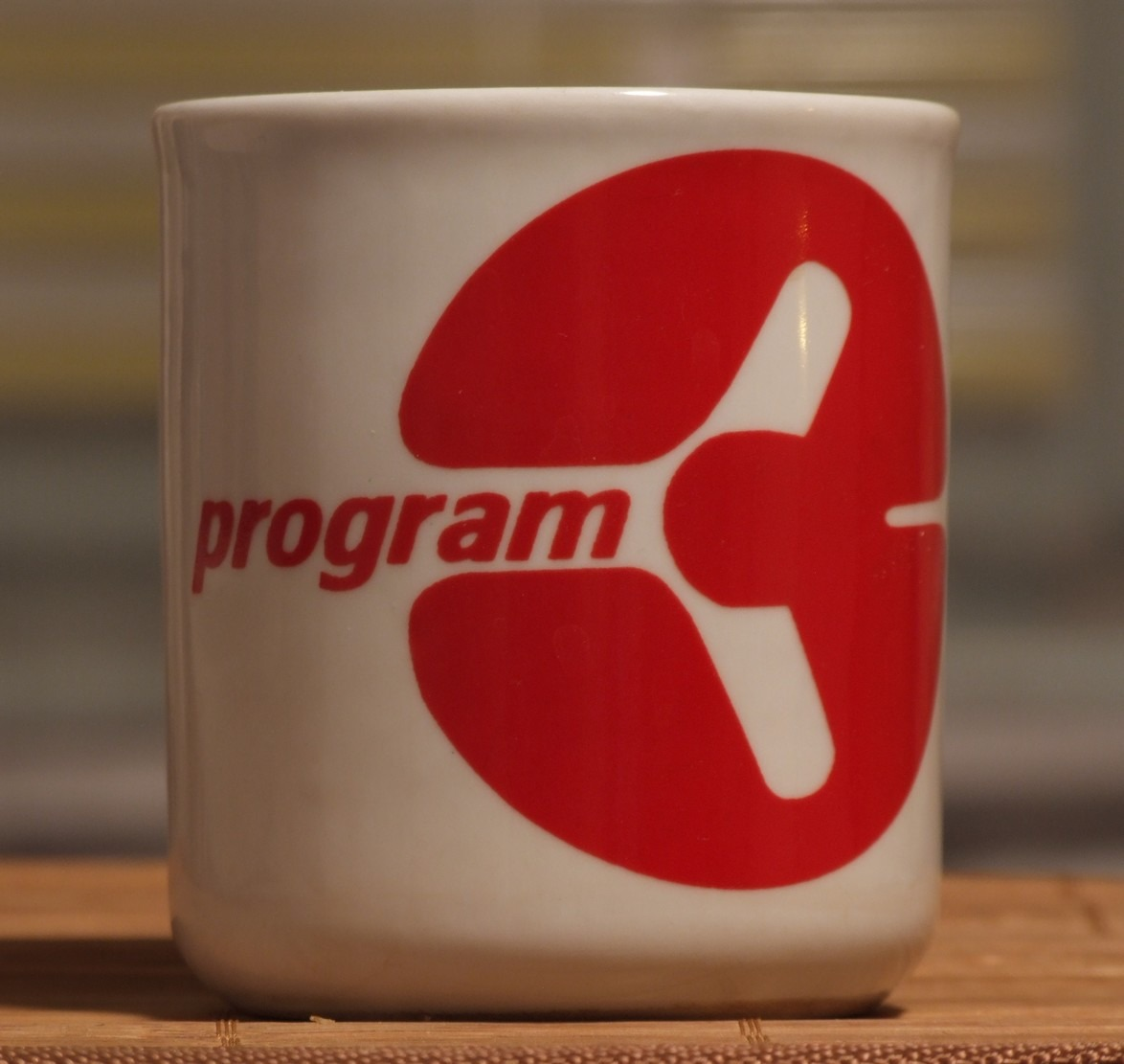
A mug with the old logo of PR3 (1996–2005).

=== Beginnings ===
Polish Radio Programme 3 is based at 3/5/7 Myśliwiecka Street in Warsaw. The radio station building is one of the buildings of the former barracks. Burnt down during World War II, it was adapted for radio use and opened on 22 July 1949.

=== Recent ===
From 2015, the stations most known DJ's started to resign from the network or were fired (including Artur Orzech, Artur Andrus, Robert Kantereit, Dariusz Rosiak, Anna Gacek and Wojciech Mann). In May 2020 the station suffered a major transformation - after the visit of Jarosław Kaczyński, chairman of the Polish ruling party Prawo i Sprawiedliwosc to the grave of Smolensk air disaster victims (all cemeteries were then closed due to COVID-19 pandemics) became known to the public, a song relating to the events (with the catchline "Your pain is better than mine") debuted on the first place of the Lista Przebojów, winning this music chart. The next day Polish Radio made a statement that the results were fabricated. The statement received highly negative comments from many politicians (both opposition and the ruling party) and artists, as the list had existed since 1983 and most of the list staff had been working in Polish Radio since as early as 1978.

The accusations of fabrication resulted in resignations first of the Music Chart team, and later of almost all Trójka journalists. This followed by airing many hours of music without hosts (normally, the station plays music without hosts for only two hours a year, during Christmas Eve Wigilia supper). Some of the journalist from the team decided to come back to the station after one of them became the Trójka director, but they left the station again after he was removed from this position in August (after three months in office). Polish Radio then assembled a new team for the station, which included a few journalists that decided to stay and many coming from other media outlets, including some right-wing commentators. The new team of Trójka resulted in a huge drop of listenership, from around 8% to less than 2% of the market.

Former Trójka journalists now work at Radio 357 and Radio Nowy Świat.

== Logo ==
| 1962–1994 | The first logo featured a red number 3 stylised as a tape reel, with the word “program” in red in the centre. |
| 1994–2002 | The second version of the symbol referred to the former Polish Radio logo – four concentric circles in red, with the words “POLSKIE RADIO” in black in the centre, and an italicised number 3 in the lower-right corner. |
| 2002 – January 2005 | A red “Trójka” inscription above which is the number 3 enclosed in a circle, next to the station’s then slogan “you will hear more...”. The whole is underlined with a red line. Beneath the logo appears the inscription “POLSKIE RADIO SA”. This logo is still used as a neon sign above the entrance to Trójka’s headquarters. |
| February 2005 – present | The current logo refers to the new Polish Radio logotype – on the left three concentric circles enclosed in a square, on the right a rectangle with the inscription “Trójka”, and below it “POLSKIE RADIO”. The colour scheme is pink and white. |

== See also ==
- Trojka (disambiguation)
