= Marc Gascoigne =

British author and game designer

- Writing career
- Genres: Children's, games, science fiction, fantasy

Marc Gascoigne is a British author and editor. He is the editor, author or co-author of more than fifty books and gaming related titles, including Fighting Fantasy books, Shadowrun novels and adventures, Earthdawn novels and adventures, the original Games Workshop Judge Dredd roleplaying game, and material for Paranoia, Call of Cthulhu and many others listed below.

== Biography ==
Marc Gascoigne co-wrote Games Workshop's original Judge Dredd Roleplaying Game and Puffin's mass-market Advanced Fighting Fantasy trilogy. Gascoigne also published Warhammer Fantasy Roleplay. He has also written and edited for Chaosium, West End Games, and FASA.

Gascoigne was the developer or editor of several of GW's classic boardgames in the mid-1980s, including the first two editions of Blood Bowl, and created the background for Dark Future, ported onto the car-based boardgame after the cancellation of an original cyberpunk-themed roleplaying game.

Although he worked on the popular children's series Fighting Fantasy as an editor, he only ever published one gamebook as author, which was called Battleblade Warrior (1988). It was number 31 of 59 in the original series and was released in early 1988. However, he also wrote two related novels, and five books under the Advanced Fighting Fantasy banner, including Titan (1986), an encyclopedia of the fictional world in which most of the gamebooks are set. He edited issues 10 to 13 of Warlock, the FF magazine, in 1986.

After ten years as a freelance editor, he returned to Games Workshop in 1997 to help establish the Black Library fiction imprint. Starting as editor he became publisher and overall manager of the BL Publishing family of imprints, that during a time also included Black Industries and Solaris Books.

Gascoigne, with Rick Priestley and Andy Jones of Warhammer, developed the idea for the Black Library which produced the magazine Inferno! as a result beginning in July 1997. Gascoigne was the general manager of Games Workshop's BL Publishing division, making books, board games, and RPGs.

He left this post at the end of March 2008 when Games Workshop downsized its staff. It was announced on 11th Sept 2008 that he had joined HarperCollins to create a new science fiction & fantasy imprint to be called Angry Robot.

Angry Robot was acquired by Osprey Publishing in September 2010. In October 2011, Gascoigne won the World Fantasy Special Award—Professional for Angry Robot, presented at the World Fantasy Convention in San Diego, California. In 2014 Angry Robot and other imprints, were sold by Osprey to Etan Ilfeld. In 2016 Gascoigne won the British Fantasy Award in the category Best Independent Press, again for Angry Robot. Gasciogne left Angry Robot at the end of 2018.

In 2019 Gascoigne was hired to launch a new imprint, Aconyte Books, for Asmodee Entertainment Ltd.

== Bibliography ==
=== Fighting Fantasy ===
- Out of the Pit (Puffin 1985, monster book, author but credited as editor)
- Titan: the Fighting Fantasy World (Puffin 1986, world guide, author but credited as editor)
- #31: Battleblade Warrior (Puffin 1988, gamebook)
- Advanced Fighting Fantasy: Dungeoneer (Puffin 1989, rpg rules, with Pete Tamlyn)
- Advanced Fighting Fantasy: Blacksand! (Puffin 1990, rpg rules, with Pete Tamlyn)
- Demonstealer (Puffin 1991, novel)
- The Fighting Fantasy 10th Anniversary Yearbook (Puffin 1992, compiler)
- Shadowmaster (Puffin 1992, novel, with Ian Livingstone)
- Advanced Fighting Fantasy: Allansia (Puffin 1994, rpg rules, with Pete Tamlyn)

=== Shadowrun ===
- #8: Streets of Blood (Roc 1993, with Carl Sargent)
- #14: Nosferatu (Roc 1994, with Carl Sargent)
- #20: Black Madonna (Roc 1996, with Carl Sargent)

=== Earthdawn ===
- Shroud of Madness (Fasa 1995, with Carl Sargent)

=== Warhammer 40,000 ===
- Into the Maelstrom (Black Library 1999, editor, with Andy Jones)
- Dark Imperium (Black Library 2001, editor, with Andy Jones)
- Eternal War (Black Library 2001, graphic novel, editor, with Christian Dunn)
- Status: Deadzone (Black Library 2000, editor, with Andy Jones)
- Words of Blood (Black Library 2002, editor, with Christian Dunn)
- Crucible of War (Black Library 2003, editor, with Christian Dunn)
- Eternal Damnation (Black Library 2003, graphic novel, editor, with Christian Dunn)
- What Price Victory (Black Library 2004, editor, with Christian Dunn)
- Bringers of Death (Black Library 2005, editor, with Christian Dunn)
- Flames of War (Black Library 2005, graphic novel, editor, with Christian Dunn)
- Let the Galaxy Burn (Black Library 2006, editor, with Christian Dunn)
- The Art of Warhammer 40,000 (Black Library 2006, compiler, with Matt Ralphs)
- Tales of the Dark Millennium (Black Library 2006, editor, with Christian Dunn)

=== Warhammer ===
- Realm of Chaos (Black Library 2000, editor, with Andy Jones)
- Lords of Valour (Black Library 2001, editor, with Andy Jones)
- Way of the Dead (Black Library 2003, editor, with Christian Dunn)
- Swords of the Empire (Black Library 2004, editor, with Christian Dunn)
- The Call of Chaos (Black Library 2004, graphic novel, editor, with Christian Dunn)
- The Cold Hand of Betrayal (Black Library 2006, editor, with Christian Dunn)
- Tales of the Old World (Black Library 2007, editor, with Christian Dunn)
- The Art of Warhammer (Black Library 2007, compiler, with Nick Kyme)
- Invasion! (Black Library 2007, editor, with Christian Dunn)

=== Other fiction ===
- Sonic the Hedgehog novels (with Carl Sargent & James Wallis, as "Martin Adams"):
  - Sonic in the Fourth Dimension (Virgin 1993)
  - Robotnik's Laboratory (Virgin 1993)
  - Sonic & the Silicon Warriors (Virgin 1993)
  - Castle Robotnik (Virgin 1994)
- Sonic the Hedgehog gamebooks (with Jonathan Green):
  - #5: Theme Park Panic (Puffin 1995, ISBN 0-14-037847-2)
  - #6: Stormin' Sonic (Puffin 1996, ISBN 0-14-037848-0)
- Others
  - Ren & Stimpy's Happy Happy! Joy Joy! Book (Puffin 1994, with James Wallis)
  - The Bill: Killjoys (Puffin 1997)
  - The Bill: Never Too Young (Puffin 1997)

=== Roleplaying games ===
- Judge Dredd: The Role-Playing Game
  - The Judge Dredd Roleplaying Game (Games Workshop 1985, with Rick Priestley)
  - The Judge Dredd RPG Companion (Games Workshop 1987, compiler)
- Shadowrun
  - London and Great Britain (Fasa 1991, Shadowrun sourcebook, with Carl Sargent)
  - Tir na nÓg (Fasa 1993, Shadowrun sourcebook, with Carl Sargent)
  - Celtic Double Cross (Fasa 1993, Shadowrun adventure, with Carl Sargent)
  - Prime Runners (Fasa 1994, Shadowrun sourcebook, with Carl Sargent)
- Earthdawn
  - Skypoint & Vivane (Fasa 1995, Earthdawn sourcebook, with Carl Sargent)

=== As contributor ===
- Blood Bowl 1st & 2nd editions (Games Workshop 1986 &1988)
- Blood Bowl: Death Zone (Games Workshop 1987)
- Blood Bowl: Star Players (Games Workshop 1989
- Chainsaw Warrior (Games Workshop 1986)
- The Crash Course Manual (West End 1989, Paranoia sourcebook)
- Green & Pleasant Land (Games Workshop 1987, Call of Cthulhu UK sourcebook)
- Hobby Games: The 100 Best (Green Ronin 2007)
- Family Games: The 100 Best (Green Ronin 2010)

=== Non-fiction ===
- Pog Off! (Puffin 1995)
- You Can Surf the Net (Puffin 1996, revised US edition 1997)
- The UFO Investigator's Handbook (Puffin 1996)
- The Ghost Investigator's Handbook (Puffin 1997)
- The Dinosaur Investigator's Handbook (Puffin 1997)

=== Magazines ===
- DragonLords (1980–1985, RPG fanzine, with Ian Marsh & Mike Lewis)
- White Dwarf (1984–1987, various editorial roles)
- Warlock (1985–1986, contributor then editor)
- Inferno! (1997–2004, assistant editor/designer, then editor, then publisher)
- Warhammer Monthly/Warhammer Comic (1998–2004, as Inferno!)
