= Challenge of the Five Realms =

1992 video game

Challenge of the Five Realms: Spellbound in the World of Nhagardia
- Developer: MicroProse Greensburg
- Publisher: MicroProse
- Designers: Rick Hall; F. J. Lennon; Marc Miller
- Programmers: Rick Hall; Frank Kern
- Artist: Quinno Martin
- Writers: John Vincent Antinori; Laura Kampo
- Composer: Michael Bross
- Platform: MS-DOS
- Release: 1992
- Genre: Role-playing
- Mode: Single-player

Challenge of the Five Realms: Spellbound in the World of Nhagardia is a role-playing video game created by MicroProse Greensburg and published by MicroProse under the Microplay Software label for MS-DOS and published in 1992.

Tommo purchased the rights to this game and digitally publishes it through its Retroism brand in 2015.

== Plot ==
Challenge of the Five Realms is a game in which the Prince of Castle Ballytogue awakens from being hit on the head to find out that his father, King Clesodor of Alonia, has been killed by the evil sorcerer Grimnoth. As the prince seeks to avenge his father and defeat Grimnoth, he must explore the five realms and their numerous cities, and visit many people within only 100 game days.

== Reception ==
James Trunzo reviewed Challenge of the Five Realms in White Wolf #37 (July/Aug., 1993) and stated that "Overall, here's a fantasy role-playing game that doesn't try to be something totally new and different. Instead, it takes the basics of the genre and improves upon them. Take a close look at Challenge of the Five Realms. You'll like what you see."

The game was reviewed in 1993 in Dragon #196 by Hartley, Patricia, and Kirk Lesser in "The Role of Computers" column. The reviewers gave the game 3 out of 5 stars. Computer Gaming World stated that "though, at times, Challenge rates highly on the esteemed fun-o-meter, there are still several elements of game design where Challenge is lacking", criticizing the apparent lack of "an adequate beta testing program—there are simply too many oversights with a certain awkwardness to gameplay that shouldn't exist in a final version".
