= Shroud of Madness =

1995 novel by Carl Sargent and Marc Gascoigne

Shroud of Madness is a novel by Carl Sargent and Marc Gascoigne published by FASA in 1995.

== Plot summary ==
Shroud of Madness is an Earthdawn novel which takes place in the Theran city of Vivane, in which elven praetori Cassian investigates a series of murders and apparent suicides affecting the major noble houses.

== Reception ==
Andy Butcher reviewed Shroud of Madness for Arcane magazine, rating it a 6 out of 10 overall. Butcher comments that "It's not required reading, by any means, but anyone planning to run adventures in and around the city will find lots of useful background detail for their games."

== Reviews ==
- PC Format (Hungarian)
