= Trojka =

Trojka or Trójka literally means the digit or number "3" in some Slavic languages (e.g. Serbian, Bosnian, Polish, Czech, Slovak).

The word may also refer to:

- Trójka, Greater Poland Voivodeship, a village in Poland
- Utva Trojka, a Yugoslav light aircraft
- Trojka (TV channel), a defunct Slovak television channel owned and operated by Radio and Television of Slovakia until 2022.
- Trójka or Radiowa Trójka, Polskie Radio Program III
- Another name for Troika (Bosnia and Herzegovina), a liberal political alliance in Bosnia and Herzegovina.

== See also ==
- Troika (disambiguation)
