= MegaTraveller 1: The Zhodani Conspiracy =

1990 video game

- Developer: Paragon Software
- Publisher: Paragon Software
- Directors: Jane Yeager, Richard Yapp
- Designers: Christopher Straka, Jane Yeager
- Programmers: Thomas J. Holmes, Charles Griffith, Andrew L. Miller
- Artists: Jane Yeager; Steve Suhy
- Composers: Charles Griffith, Thomas J. Holmes
- Platforms: Amiga, Atari ST, MS-DOS
- Release: 1990
- Genre: Role-playing
- Mode: Single player

MegaTraveller 1: The Zhodani Conspiracy is a 1990 space science fiction role-playing video game based on the Traveller series and was produced by Game Designers' Workshop licensee Paragon Software for Amiga, Atari ST, and MS-DOS. The game is set within the Official Traveller Universe and features character creation and other aspects of game mechanics compatible with prior Traveller products. The player controls up to five ex-military adventurers whose objective is to save their civilization, the Imperium, from a conspiracy instigated by the Zhodani, a rival spacefaring race, and aided by the actions of a traitor named Konrad Kiefer. Gameplay features real-time planetary and space exploration, combat, trading, and interaction with various non-player characters in eight solar systems containing twenty-eight visitable planets.

Development presented Paragon with technical challenges because this game, distributed on floppy disks for computers hosting as little as 512 KB RAM, simulates the detailed game mechanics of the Traveller tabletop role-playing games within a sizable game world. To meet the difficulties posed by these hardware limitations, Paragon chose to excise or simplify some elements familiar to players of earlier Traveller games. Reception upon the release of the game was very mixed. Some reviewers rated it highly and praised its playability and depth of gameplay. Others reviewed the game less favorably; substantial criticism was directed towards its handling of ground combat. Computer Gaming World listed it as the fourth worst game of all time in its November 1996 issue. A sequel, MegaTraveller 2: Quest for the Ancients, was published in 1991; a second sequel was planned but never released.

== Gameplay ==
Before players may begin a new game, a party of adventurers must be created. A pre-generated party is available for quick entry into the game, but players may also create new party members. The character creation process begins with the player being presented with basic character profiles possessing randomly generated attributes. The player has the option to accept the displayed character or "re-roll" to generate a new profile with another set of attributes. An accepted character is enrolled in a military career, chosen by the player from the Army, Navy, Marines, Scouts, or Merchants. The player guides the character through consecutive four-year terms to obtain training in various skills and earn service benefits such as retirement pay. The longer characters remain in the service, the more skills and benefits they are able to acquire, but they do so at the risk of diminished attributes due to old age, injury, or even death. When a character retires or "musters out", he or she is added to the pool of available adventurers from which a party is chosen by the player to begin the game. If a character is killed during the course of the game, the player may recruit a new party member in some planetary spaceports.

The game begins in a city on the planet Efate. Here, as on all explorable planets in this game, the player observes the party and its surroundings from a directly overhead point of view and issues commands via hotkeys or clickable icons displayed onscreen. The explorable terrain of planets is limited to certain cities and immediately adjacent regions. Cities feature several types of buildings that are a recurrent feature on most planets, including a store for purchasing or selling armor, weapons, and other items, a library, a hospital, a police station, and a starport for launching and outfitting a spaceship. Some cities host additional visitable buildings which may include a tavern or a hotel in which important non-player characters are located. Building types are color-coded for easier player identification. The player directs the party's movements and issues commands to perform various actions such as communicating with non-player characters, using objects, or firing a weapon. Combat takes place in real-time and requires the player to direct individual party members to target opponents and fire their weapons, reload, or move to a better position.

Space travel forms an important aspect of gameplay. When traveling within a single solar system, the ship and its surroundings are viewed from a third-person perspective on an "In System Travel Screen." Navigation takes place in real-time as the player maneuvers the ship between explorable worlds, visits a gas giant to refuel, or engages in combat with other spaceships. Some solar systems contain more than one explorable planet, but most such planets in the game may be reached only after the player's spaceship has been outfitted with a "jump drive" capable of interstellar travel and accompanying computer software to control it.

== Plot ==
The game takes place within the fictional universe in which prior Traveller releases are also set. The most significant power in this universe is the human-dominated Imperium which predominates across thousands of inhabited solar systems. Bordering the regions controlled by the Imperium are other interstellar powers including the Zhodani Consulate. The Imperium and the Zhodani have a long history of tense relations and, as the game begins, rumors of another frontier war are circulating. Against this backdrop, a security agent working for Sharushid, a large corporation active throughout the Imperium, discovers that a company sub-sector chief named Konrad Kiefer is secretly aiding the Zhodani by smuggling arms across the border into the hands of dissidents in preparation for an uprising within the Imperium to be coordinated with a Zhodani attack. This security agent encounters five experienced adventurers in a bar on the planet Efate and entrusts them with evidence of Kiefer's treachery. These adventurers are tasked with delivering the evidence to a second Sharushid agent located in another solar system and ultimately with stopping Kiefer and his conspiracy against the Imperium. The player assumes control over the party just after the security agent entrusts it with the evidence against Kiefer.

The game includes numerous subplots which largely serve as means for the player to earn money. For example, the player can choose to locate and retrieve a stolen icon on behalf of a religious leader in exchange for a reward. Other methods to earn money include stripping the corpses of slain opponents for marketable items, killing wanted criminals to earn a reward, and attacking other vessels in space to pirate their cargo. Gameplay in the early stages of the game primarily involves activities of this nature so that the player can accumulate enough money to outfit the party with better weapons and armor and purchase a jump drive capable of propelling the party's spacecraft to other worlds crucial to obtaining the means to stop Kiefer.

Events in this game transpire just prior to the Fifth Frontier War between the Imperium and the Zhodani, which marks the line of demarcation between earlier tabletop role-playing products released by Game Designers Workshop under the name Traveller and later products set after the war released under the name MegaTraveller. This game is the only MegaTraveller product authorized by Game Designers Workshop where events occur prior to this conflict.

== Development ==
Marc Miller, an original creator of Traveller, wrote in a letter of introduction to this game, "I've always said that Traveller would make the perfect computer game for the same two reasons that it's a great role-playing game: rules and background. The background, and its wealth of detail, will naturally capture the interest of players. But it's the simplicity of the rules which makes the computerization possible." After Paragon Software acquired the video game rights to Traveller from Game Designers Workshop, Miller contributed "generous support and research material" to Paragon's development efforts.

The limited capacity of the floppy disk media on which the game was distributed and the hardware limitations of computer systems at the time of the game's release forced Paragon's developers to limit certain aspects of the Traveller universe and game mechanics. Starship design and alien character creation, both of which are available in other products set in the Traveller universe, were deliberately excluded from this game. Explorable planetary terrain was limited to a relatively small area. Both space and planetary exploration employ relatively generalized maps to simplify the program and eliminate minor details. Space combat uses a simpler set of rules than those found in Traveller's original "Starship Combat" ruleset.

In Computer Gaming World, L.S. Lichtmann wrote that the development of some aspects of the game was left incomplete. He observed that some promotional screenshots do not resemble anything players encounter in the actual game and that a pamphlet included in the game box lists a large number of differences between what is written in the manual and the actual game mechanics.

== Reception ==
Reactions to MegaTraveller 1 varied greatly. Some reviewers commended the game's design, playability, and depth of gameplay. Arnie Katz wrote in VideoGames & Computer Entertainment that the "...extensive character-generation system, eye-catching graphics, flexible quick-play interface, and majestic scope make MegaTraveller a necessary addition to any adventurer's computer library." Reviewer Sandra Foley wrote in Amiga Computing that its gameplay "brilliantly balance[s] complexity and playability, MT1's gameplay is a miracle in that it actually feels like a RPG. A triumph of intelligent game design." She assigned the game a rating of 95%. Writing for Amiga Power, reviewer Stuart Campbell gave the game a rating of 88% and stated that "MegaTraveller 1 is involving, playable, superbly-designed, and one of the most atmospheric games I've played ever. It balances realism with gameplay, and is extremely user-friendly...." Computer Gaming World took a more negative view of the game. In 1993 Scorpia stated that it "comes off rather poorly", criticizing the "atrocious combat system" and economy. She concluded that the game "is only for the devoted MegaTraveller fan with a high tolerance for exasperation". In 1996 the magazine's editorial staff listed MegaTraveller 1 as the fourth worst game of all time and "easily the Mega-worst role-playing experience of all time." They wrote that the plot "felt tossed-off...from rehashes of pen and paper modules that [Miller] had designed in the past." Amiga Format also expressed disappointment with the game's plot. Its reviewer wrote that the player's effort is largely directed towards earning money and that the "main plot consists of about six conversations, swapping a few items, and blowing away Kiefer Konrad."

The game's handling of ground combat received the most substantial criticism. Computer Gaming World's editorial staff wrote that the game's real-time combat system was "handled so fast that players didn't have a chance in 90% of the battles." According to reviewer L.S. Lichtmann, "many are disappointed because the phased, tactical system of Traveller has been modified to have arcade game characteristics." He also stated that the player does not compete on a "level playing field" when he or she must issue commands in real-time to individual party members engaged in combat while the computer simultaneously controls multiple non-player characters. Paragon responded to these criticisms by releasing an updated version of the game which gave the player the ability to pause the combat to issue orders to party members. But even after this update, some reviewers still found that, whenever possible, it is still far easier for the party to flee from ground combat situations than to fight. Moreover, immediately after the player assumes control of the party at the start of the game, it is attacked by well-armed opponents. The Computer Gaming World editorial staff criticized this design choice by stating that the "player would have to run away from the first encounter or be killed within two minutes of spending 30 minutes to an hour generating a character."

Another element of game mechanics that received significant criticism was the game's handling of space flight. Paragon's attempt to simulate realistic space physics, including planetary gravitational fields and spaceship inertia, is a potential source of difficulty for some players. According to Paul Presley, the Asteroids inspired type of "control method becomes very awkward until you get used to it (and that could take some time)."

Graphics were another issue on which reviewers did not find consensus. Reviewer Scott Miller mentioned the "amazingly detailed EGA graphics" in the game's IBM compatible release in a review published in Compute!. L.S. Lichtmann found this version's graphics to be merely "adequate to the task." and reviewer Chris Jenkins stated that the "graphics are colourful, but not overly imaginative." Sandra Foley commended the graphics of the game's Amiga release: "Big, colourful, and easy on the eye, MegaTraveller's graphics are better than those of any previous computer RPG." Amiga Format's reviewer wrote, "Every time something moves on the screen, it jerks. All the moving graphics look small, blocky and quite pathetic. The scrolling is eyewatering...."

Jim Trunzo reviewed MegaTraveller 1: The Zhodani Conspiracy in White Wolf #22 (Aug./Sept., 1990), rating it a 4 out of 5 and stated that "MegaTraveller I: The Zhodani Conspiracy is one of the most thorough computer role-playing games available today. Gamers who have little or no experience with Traveller would do well to read the majority of the excellently written 145 page manual carefully before playing."

Scott Miller stated that the game's IBM compatible release supports both RealSound and the Covox Speech Thing which provide "great sound effects" to the player with the proper computer hardware.

== Versions ==
Criticism of the game's handling of ground combat upon its initial release prompted Paragon to issue an updated version 3.0 of the game in late 1990 which featured an enhanced combat system. The new version offered the ability for the player to pause repeatedly the real-time combat to order party members to change their positions or fire their weapons at a selected opponent. This update was made available without charge to everyone who had purchased an earlier version of the game.

Paragon implemented additional changes in preparation for the game's publication in the United Kingdom by its European distributor, Empire Software. On the basis of criticism generated upon the game's initial release, the user interface was retooled to provide the player with greater ability to control the game with a mouse, and the realistic inertia-based thrust model of spaceship flight was replaced.

== Legacy ==
Marc Miller subsequently assumed a more direct role as a game designer with Paragon Software in its work on a sequel, MegaTraveller 2: Quest for the Ancients, published in 1991. MegaTraveller 2 featured an updated user interface which incorporated some of the enhancements Paragon made in preparation for MegaTraveller 1's release in the United Kingdom. In the summer of 1992, MicroProse issued a newsletter promising the release of a third installment in the series to be published in the fall of 1992 under its MicroPlay label. The advertisement claimed that MegaTraveller 3: The Unknown Worlds would include three distinctly themed scenarios: "pursuit and rescue, mysterious quest and classic science fiction." It was also stated that this game would feature a "new random world generator that guarantees no two universes are ever the same." However, neither Paragon Software nor MicroProse released subsequent MegaTraveller games.

In November 1996, Computer Gaming World's editors wrote that MegaTraveller 1's "failure kept many other deserving paper RPGs from traveling to the computer for nearly a decade."
