= Threesome (disambiguation) =

A threesome is sexual activity involving three people

Threesome may also refer to:

- The Threesome, 2025 film directed by Chad Hartigan and written by Ethan Ogilby
- Threesome (1984 film), 1984 TV film starring Stephen Collins and Joel Higgins
- Threesome (1994 film), 1994 film by Andrew Fleming
- Threesome (2017 film), 2017 film by Nicolas Monette
- Threesome (British TV series), a 2011 British television sitcom
- Threesome (Swedish TV series), a 2021 Swedish romantic drama
- Threesome (Hong Kong TV series), a 2018 Hong Kong legal comedy drama
- "Threesome", song by Fenix TX from Lechuza
- "Threesome", an episode on the tenth season of Naked and Afraid

== See also ==
- Triad (sociology), a group of three people in sociology
- Ménage à trois, any living relationship between three people, at times also involving sex
- 3SUM, a problem in computational complexity theory
- Troika (disambiguation)
- Trojak (dance), a Silesian folk dance
