= Double Take Comics =

American comic book publisher

Double Take LLC
- Company type: Subsidiary
- Industry: Comic books
- Founded: October 30, 2014; 11 years ago
- Founder: Bill Jemas
- Defunct: November 2016
- Fate: Dissolved
- Headquarters: New York City, US
- Key people: Bill Jemas (general manager)
- Parent: Take-Two Interactive

Double Take LLC, commonly referred to as Double Take Comics, was an American comic book publisher based in New York City. Founded by former Marvel Comics executive Bill Jemas as a subsidiary of Take-Two Interactive in October 2014, the company served as Take-Two Interactive's pilot project in comic book publishing. The company published five issues each from ten original comic book series, and was shut down in November 2016.

== History ==
Double Take Comics was founded by Bill Jemas, formerly President of Marvel Comics, as a subsidiary of video game company Take-Two Interactive. Jemas announced on December 20, 2013, that he was to preparing to launch a new comic book imprint with Take-Two Interactive, although a final direction had not yet been chosen. Take-Two Interactive had previously filed trademarks for possible names of the label, including Codex, Carante, and Double Take. Jemas settled on Double Take, and its opening was formally announced on October 30, 2014.

All comic book series published by Double Take were inspired by and set in an alternate reality of Night of the Living Dead. Jemas originally also considered creating comics on XCOM, BioShock and Civilization, three video game franchises owned by Take-Two Interactive, but could not come to terms with the respective game studios. He went Night of the Living Dead instead, seeing that the intellectual property was in the public domain, and because he felt like zombies were popular at the time. Jemas planned on distributing the comics digitally, through ComiXology and Madefire, and produce print versions later on.

The first issues of Double Take's first ten comic book series, namely Soul, Slab, Dedication, Rise, Medic, Honor, Spring, Home, Remote and Z-Men, were announced in March 2015. All ten first issues were released on September 16, 2015, with the release schedule being assisted by marketing coordinator Gabe Yocum. A movie adaptation of Z-Men, in cooperation with Lionsgate, was announced in October 2015. In February 2016, Double Take partnered with The Moth to bring more realism into their releases.

In September 2016, the company gave away 10,000 printed copies of their releases to visitors of the New York Comic Con. In October 2016, it was reported that Jemas was seeking US$1.2 million from private investors to purchase Double Take from Take-Two Interactive. Jemas initially denied the claim, stating "not even close", however, it was announced in November 2016 that the company was to close at the end of that month. Four spin-off series of their works, Z-Mart, Behold, 51 and Alphabet City, which were set to be released in December 2016, were never published.

== Books published ==
Release	Title
September 16, 2015	Dedication #1: Dead Stock
September 16, 2015	Home #1: Lighter than Air
September 16, 2015	Medic #1: Flatline
September 16, 2015	Rise #1: Sister's Keeper
September 16, 2015	Slab #1: The Doctor Is in
September 16, 2015	Soul #1: Friendly Fire
September 16, 2015	Spring #1: Born Again
September 16, 2015	Z-Men #1: Nervous in the Service
September 16, 2015	Honor #1: Protect. Serve. Beat. Burn.
September 16, 2015	Remote #1: Dead Air
November 11, 2015	Dedication #2: Midnight Snack
November 11, 2015	Home #2: Thicker than Water
November 11, 2015	Honor #2: Dead Badge of Courage
November 11, 2015	Medic #2: Undead on Arrival
November 11, 2015	Remote #2: Radio Silence
November 11, 2015	Rise #2: Last Generation
November 11, 2015	Slab #2: Fresh Flesh
November 11, 2015	Soul #2: Good Mourning
November 11, 2015	Spring #2: Undertow
November 11, 2015	Z-Men #2: All the President's Men
February 24, 2016	Dedication #3: Checked Out
February 24, 2016	Home #3: Dinner Is Served
February 24, 2016	Honor #3: Blood Brigade
February 24, 2016	Medic #3: Graveyard Shift
February 24, 2016	Remote #3: Live at Five
February 24, 2016	Rise #3: You Can't Go Home Again
February 24, 2016	Slab #3: Bare Bones
February 24, 2016	Soul #3: Free Fall
February 24, 2016	Spring #3: Sink or Swim
February 24, 2016	Z-Men #3: The Thing they Carried
June 1, 2016	Dedication #4: Clean Up on Aisle Z
June 1, 2016	Home #4: Flesh and Blood
June 1, 2016	Honor #4: Insurrection
June 1, 2016	Medic #4: Intensive Scare
June 1, 2016	Remote #4: Technical Difficulties
June 1, 2016	Rise #4: Born Against
June 1, 2016	Slab #4: Doctor's Orders
June 1, 2016	Soul #4: No Saint's Day
June 1, 2016	Spring #4: Level Up
June 1, 2016	Z-Men #4: Home of the Grave
August 24, 2016	Dedication #5: Z-Mart
August 24, 2016	Home #5: Reunion
August 24, 2016	Honor #5: Justice
August 24, 2016	Medic #5: In Stitches
August 24, 2016	Remote #5: Play it Again
August 24, 2016	Rise #5: Fall
August 24, 2016	Slab #5: Rigor
August 24, 2016	Soul #5: Rest in Peace
August 24, 2016	Spring #5: Torrent
August 24, 2016	Z-Men #5: Rabridge
