= Twilight: 2000 (video game) =

1991 video game

- Developer(s): Paragon Software
- Publisher(s): MicroProse
- Platform(s): MS-DOS
- Release: 1991
- Genre(s): Role-playing

Twilight: 2000 is a role-playing video game released in 1991 for MS-DOS. It is based on the tabletop role-playing game of the same name.

== Gameplay ==
The video game depicts a squad of 20 soldiers stranded behind enemy lines in Poland, struggling against the despot Baron Czarny.

== Development ==
In 1991, Game Designers' Workshop licensees Paragon developed a computer game adaptation (complete with expansion, "the Colonel") of Twilight: 2000.

== Reception ==
J. D. Lambright reviewed the game for Computer Gaming World, and stated that "RPGers who like plenty of combat should find Twilight 2000 an excellent choice."

Jim Trunzo reviewed Twilight 2000 in White Wolf #32 (July/Aug., 1992), rating it a 3 out of 5 and stated that "Twilight 2000 will challenge both novice and experienced gamers. Those tired of standard science fiction and/or high fantasy should investigate Paragon's latest offering because it has a uniqueness not found in many games. Don't be surprised to see a sequel in the near future; like its pencil and paper predecessor, their [sic] are many avenues open for computer Twilight 2000."
