= Paragon Software =

Video game developer

MicroProse Greensburg
- Formerly: Customized Software Systems (1985-1986); Microsphere Corporation (1986-1987); Paragon Software Corporation (1987-1992)
- Type: Private
- Industry: Video games
- Founded: December 12, 1985; 40 years ago
- Founders: Mark E. Seremet; Antony Davies
- Defunct: September 30, 1993
- Fate: Publishing business merged into MicroProse; Assets became Take-Two Interactive
- Successor: Take-Two Interactive
- Headquarters: Greensburg, Pennsylvania, U.S.
- Number of employees: 19 (1992)
- Parent: MicroProse (1992-1993)

Paragon Software Corporation was an American video game developer based in Greensburg, Pennsylvania that was originally formed on December 12, 1985 as Customized Software Systems by Mark E. Seremet and Antony Davies, with backing from John Antinori, and it was renamed to Paragon Software in 1986. The company was later sold to MicroProse in 1992.

The company was best known for games developed around licenses from Marvel Comics, including The Amazing Spider-Man and Captain America in Dr. Doom's Revenge!, and licenses from Game Designers' Workshop, such as the MegaTraveller series.

== History ==
The company initially started life as Customized Software Systems. The company was initially founded on December 12, 1985 in Latrobe, Pennsylvania, by Mark E. Seremet and Antony Davies, and specialized on computer software programming.

In 1986, F.J. Lennon joined the company and turned their attention from business software to making video games. Davies later quit to pursue his PhD. The company later changed its name from Customized Software Systems to Microsphere Corporation, and eventually settling on Paragon Software in 1987, as the company developed its first video game, Master Ninja: Shadow Warrior of Death.

In early 1988, the company signed a distribution deal with Electronic Arts, in order that Electronic Arts became a distributor for Paragon's titles, but it did not last long.

In mid 1988, the company signed exclusive licensing deals with Game Designers' Workshop and Marvel Comics to develop video games. Also in late 1988, the company signed a distribution deal with Medalist Software Group, a division of MicroProse, to distribute their computer game titles.

On July 27, 1992, MicroProse announced that it had acquired Paragon Software, and that the company would be merged into MicroProse as a result of it, and the development team became MicroProse Greensburg. The company had 19 employees at the time.

The studio's final game under the Paragon label, XF5700 Mantis Experimental Fighter, was released under the MicroProse branding on September 2, 1992. The company continued producing games for MicroProse, including BloodNet and Challenge of the Five Realms: Spellbound in the World of Nhagardia.

Many executives later bought back their assets from MicroProse in light of the company's financial troubles, and later reformed it into Take-Two Interactive Software in 1993, and the Greensburg team became Take-Two's development studio. Subsequently, MicroProse would sell the Amiga and Macintosh rights to BloodNet and Master of Orion, among other games to Take-Two Interactive in 1994.

== Games ==
Year	Title	Publisher(s)
1987	Master Ninja: Shadow Warrior of Death	Paragon Software
1987	Alien Fires: 2199 AD	Paragon Software
1988	Twilight's Ransom	Paragon Software
1988	Wizard Wars	Paragon Software
1988	Guardians of Infinity: To Save Kennedy	Paragon Software
1989	X-Men: Madness in Murderworld	Paragon Software
1989	The Amazing Spider-Man and Captain America in Dr. Doom's Revenge!	Paragon Software, Empire Software
1990	Space: 1889	Paragon Software, Empire Software
1990	MegaTraveller 1: The Zhodani Conspiracy	Paragon Software, Empire Software
1990	The Amazing Spider-Man	Paragon Software
1990	The Punisher	Paragon Software
1991	Millennium: Return to Earth	Paragon Software, Empire Software
1991	Twilight: 2000	Paragon Software, Empire Software
1991	MegaTraveller 2: Quest for the Ancients	Paragon Software, Empire Software
1991	Troika	Paragon Software
1991	X-Men II: The Fall of the Mutants	Paragon Software
1992	XF5700 Mantis Experimental Fighter	MicroProse
1992	Challenge of the Five Realms: Spellbound in the World of Nhagardia	MicroProse
1993	BloodNet	MicroProse
