= BloodNet =

1993 video game

- Developer: MicroProse Greensburg
- Publisher: MicroProse
- Producer: Mark E. Seremet
- Designers: John Antinori; Laura Kambo
- Programmers: Rick Hall; Frank Kern; Christopher Short
- Artist: Quinno Martin
- Composer: Michael Bross
- Platforms: MS-DOS, Amiga
- Release: 1993: MS-DOS; 1994: Amiga
- Genre: Role-playing
- Mode: Single-player

BloodNet is a cyberpunk-themed role-playing video game developed by MicroProse Greensburg and published by MicroProse for MS-DOS in 1993. An Amiga port was released in 1994 by Catfish and Teeny Weeny Games. An emulated version for Microsoft Windows, Mac OS X and Linux was released in 2014.

== Gameplay ==
The interface in BloodNet is point and click with some icon-based commands available from a drop down menu. The game features written dialog and puzzles, in addition to an open-ended travel system and random encounters. An alternate "cyberspace universe" is also part of the gameplay, where codewords are required to travel to different "wells" (cyberspace locations). Role-playing elements are also present in Bloodnet: the player character and other recruitable characters have number-based stats (such as Perception, Hacking, etc.), and combat is centered around the player character's attributes and stats.

== Plot ==
A mix of future tech and gothic vampire story, in the cyberpunk style, BloodNet puts the player into the role of a man named Ransom Stark, who must battle a vampire named Abraham Van Helsing that is attempting world domination and save both humanity and the cybernet. Ransom Stark was bitten by the aforementioned vampire, but is able to fight off the infection with the help of a computer grafted onto his brain stem. He must embark on a journey to defeat the head vampire, Dracula, to stop the infection.

== Reception ==
Reception

Review score
Publication	Score
Hyper	70% (PC)

Computer Gaming World in February 1994 approved of BloodNet combining vampires and cyberpunk, non-linear gameplay, "interesting" characters and storyline, and streamlined interface. However, the reviewer said that "the game as a whole left me vaguely dissatisfied", citing a lack of direction in the story and pacing, not enough detail in Cyberspace, "confusing and frustrating" combat, and an unavoidable repeating random encounter. He concluded that BloodNet was "a gem without polish". Dragon gave the game 3 out of 5 stars. Pelit rated BloodNet 82% in the February 1994 issue, with the summary of "beautiful graphics, great atmosphere, but almost everything could have done better".

BloodNet was a runner-up for Computer Gaming World's Role-Playing Game of the Year award in June 1994, losing to Betrayal at Krondor. The editors wrote that BloodNet's "script [...] is one of the most interesting to hit this genre, and the surrealistic aspects to the art style are definitely fascinating". Richard Cobbett of PC Gamer, retrospectively reviewing the game in 2013, gave it a negative review stating that it was confusing, dull, and tedious.

The One gave the Amiga version of BloodNet an overall score of 84%, stating that "The AI system is great ... with party characters volunteering for jobs, offering opinions and reacting to your actions. It's the best implementation of this idea I've seen." The One praised the rendered 3D graphics, and also expressed their reliance on the manual for reference to items in the game, as they describe BloodNet as being "littered with objects that seem to serve no purpose ... lots of flipping back and forth between pages is necessary." The One also criticized the amount of disk swapping needed to play the game, frustrated that common actions such as examining objects and dialogue requires this. They concluded by saying "it's just not playable from floppy. Shame on you, Gametek, for suggesting, even if only by omission, that it is."

James V. Trunzo reviewed Bloodnet in White Wolf #41 (March, 1994), giving it a final evaluation of "Very Good" and stated that "Bloodnet is extremely ambitious in its overall scheme. Happily, it succeeds far more often than it fails. Oh, yeah, it loaded and played on my first attempt. Much better, Microprose!"

HardcoreGaming101 found the game great. HardcoreGaming101 praised the game's style, noting that the clunky UI often interfered with the nice graphics. Petra Tsimberov noted the main character's progression, lauding his downfall as a fable for busted machinery -- "...this is accomplished chiefly due to the game's surreal, dreamlike slew of backgrounds and character portraits. There's never anything resembling a consistent visual style, and while at times this comes off as embarrassing, at others it's thoroughly engrossing and even lends a considerable amount of flavor."

== Legacy ==
A company called "Megalo Music" claims to have written the music for a game titled Bloodnet 2000, which may or may not be a proposed sequel to Bloodnet. The game designer for Bloodnet, John Antinori, has since stated that the sequel was "never meaningfully worked on", and he would not have agreed to the title "Bloodnet 2000" because "Bloodnet was set well in future past 2000".

The game, along with Master of Orion had its some of the assets, including the Amiga and Macintosh rights, being sold to Take-Two Interactive in 1994. Several of the game design team later formed Take-Two Interactive in 1993 and created Hell: A Cyberpunk Thriller, which was a spiritual successor to the game.

Tommo purchased the rights to Bloodnet and digitally published it through its Retroism brand in 2015. Bloodnet was re-released digitally on GOG.com on January 9, 2014 and on Steam on October 17, 2014.
