= Troika (video game) =

1991 video game

- Developer(s): Paragon Software
- Publisher(s): Paragon Software
- Designer(s): Dima Pavlovsky
- Platform(s): MS-DOS
- Release: 1991

Troika is a 1991 video game compilation for MS-DOS published by Paragon Software. The three games are all by Russian developer Dima Pavlovsky: "Metal Hearts", "Ivan's Time Machine", and "Rebel Planets".

== Gameplay ==
The gameplay of "Metal Hearts" was said to be similar to Pipe Dreams.

== Reception ==
Matt Taylor reviewed the game for Computer Gaming World, and stated that "Although each of the offerings has a certain merit, this reviewer only had eyes for "Metal Hearts." All are structured in a reasonable, user-friendly way, with a save, password or stage select. Yet, one cannot help but think that, even with three games in one, Troika may be an interesting product, but it doesn't come close to Tetris."

Game Players PC Strategy Guide said that "Despite the inevitable first impression that Troika is a rehash of tired game themes, its forgiving nature sets it apart from the crowd. If you like arcade games but don't enjoy the usual attendant frustration, give Troika a try. It might addict you."
