= Mark E. Seremet =

American businessman (born 1965)

Mark Edward Seremet (born March 18, 1965) is the CEO of Zoo Games and the former CEO of Spreadshirt from 2005 to 2006. In addition, he helped found Paragon Software, which developed a few of the first video games based from the Marvel Comics characters.

After Paragon went under and being sold to MicroProse, Seremet went on to co-found the video game company Take 2 Interactive Software, and he later left in 1998. Seremet later founded GreenScreen Interactive Software with Ryan Brant in 2007.

He earned his BA from Saint Vincent College.

He has four children. He married content creator Alyssa Armoogam in 2022.
