= Dungeoneer =

- Cover of Dungeoneer
- Author: Marc Gascoigne and Pete Tamlyn
- Illustrator: John Sibbick
- Cover artist: John Sibbick
- Subject: Role-playing game rulebook
- Publication date: 1989
- Media type: Print
- ISBN: 0-14-032936-6

Dungeoneer (ISBN 0-14-032936-6) is the first of the three rule books that make up the Advanced Fighting Fantasy roleplaying game. It was written by Marc Gascoigne and Pete Tamlyn, illustrated by John Sibbick and was originally published in 1989. The system is based on Steve Jackson and Ian Livingstone's Fighting Fantasy series.

Although the Fighting Fantasy Gamebooks are currently being republished by Wizard, there are currently no plans to republish any of the Advanced Fighting Fantasy books.

== Structure ==
The book begins with a simple overview of the rules of the system and a sample adventure to introduce players and GameMasters to the rules. The book then provides the full rules for the Advanced Fighting Fantasy system. There is then a full adventure, followed by a few suggestions on how the GameMaster could go about running a full AFF campaign.

== Rules ==
Dungeoneer introduces the rules of the Advanced Fighting Fantasy system. The book uses the term 'Heroes' to describe players and the term 'Director' to describe the GameMaster. It includes the rules for creating characters and the rules for fighting battles. The book also includes rules for a variety of actions and situations, such as climbing, sneaking, and so on. The book also provides a variety of hints for Directors to help them run adventures. As mentioned above, the book provides suggestions on how to run a full campaign with the Advanced Fighting Fantasy system.

== Adventures ==
Dungeoneer contains two adventures, an introductory adventure entitled 'Tower of the Sorcerer', and a full adventure entitled 'Revenge of the Sorcerer', which continues the plot of the first adventure.

The first adventure, Tower of the Sorcerer, sets the players the task of entering the tower of the sorcerer Xortan Throg, who has kidnapped Princess Sarissa of Salamonis. The players must kill the sorcerer and rescue the Princess. However, once this task is complete, it is revealed that the sorcerer who the players have just killed is merely a simulacrum of the real Xortan Throg, leading to the second adventure.

The second adventure, Revenge of the Sorcerer, sets the players the task of traveling to the city of Blacksand to kill the real Xortan Throg. During the adventure the players encounter a ghostly priest called Sargon, who, unknown to the players, in life served one of the primal Gods of darkness. The players bring him back to life using a Crystal of Power in order to gain vital information. The adventure (if successful) ends with the players killing the sorcerer by reflecting the Death Spell that he casts at them back, using the Crystal of Power.

== Reception ==
Paul Mason reviewed Dungeoneer for Games International magazine, and gave it 3 stars out of 5, and stated that "at the price it's certainly a perfect means of introducing a Fighting Fantasy fan to the delights of proper role-playing."

== See also ==
- Dragon Warriors – another mass market paperback Fantasy RPG
- List of Fighting Fantasy gamebooks
