= Troika! (role-playing game) =

Tabletop role-playing game

- Cover of 2nd edition ("Numinous Edition"), 2019
- Designers: Daniel Sell
- Illustrators: Jeremy Duncan, Dirk Detweiler Leichty, Sam Mameli, Andrew Walter
- Publishers: Melsonian Arts Council
- Publication: 2018
- Genres: tabletop role-playing game, fantasy
- Systems: derived from Advanced Fighting Fantasy
- Website: www.melsonia.com/collections/troika

Troika! is a science fantasy indie role-playing game with a surreal multiverse setting. It was created by Daniel Sell and published by Melsonian Arts Council in 2018 under a free license, encouraging other indie role-playing game creators to use its rule system to create their own projects.

== Description ==
Troika! embraces randomness to produce unexpected player characters adventuring in unexpected settings. Character generation is randomized, with 36 possible backgrounds for characters including burglar, necromancer, dwarf, gremlin hunter, demon tracker, rhino-man, paper witch, etc. Many of the backgrounds bestow a special ability. For example, the Befouler of Ponds, who urinates into ponds and drinks stagnant water, is immune to diseases normally associated with stagnant water.

Each player character has three main attributes: Skill, Luck and Stamina. These are respectively the general ability, the fortune and intuition of and the total life points of a character.

Every enemy has six possible reactions to meeting the characters (determined randomly by the gamemaster); for example, goblins may prove to be more gossipy than aggressive.

The combat system also encompasses a certain amount of randomness, which in turn makes combat more lethal: To determine who can act during combat, all players put two chips into a bag, and the gamemaster adds two chips for each monster, as well as one chip that signifies the end of the round. If the "end of round" chip is drawn before a character's chip for several consecutive rounds, the character could die of wounds before getting an opportunity to act."

== Publication history ==
Troika! was created by Daniel Sell with illustrations by Jeremy Duncan and published by Melsonian Arts Council in 2018. The Troika! System Reference Document and license agreement encourages the creation of third-party content. As a result, many independent creators have released their own products based on its system. As of November 2024, Itch.io lists 701 physical games (as opposed to video games) with the "Troika" tag.

Sell told an interviewer that the title Troika!

is a word that convincingly sits between fiction and reality and can have some resonant weight while also being fun to say. Troika the city is the way into the world for the players. If it was called, for instance, Boslog you're just moving towards this distant thing that you'll have to build up (or not) meaning around, while Troika you're already taking some baggage with you and might find some fun synchronicities. Nonsense words are never very fun.

However, Stu Horvath conjectured the title simply refers to the three attributes that each character has.

In 2019, Melsonian released a revised and expanded Numinous edition that included an introductory adventure, "The Blancmange & Thistle". An official expansion by Luke Gearing and David Hoskins, Acid Death Fantasy, followed in 2020.

== Reception ==
Ben Brosofsky for Screen Rant recommended Troika! as an alternative to Dungeons & Dragons 5th edition, particularly for fans of Planescape.

J.R. Zambrano for Bell of Lost Souls called the game "cosmic fantasy at its finest."

Michael Barnes for There Will Be Games praised "the flexibility of Troika!, which is one of the best rules-lite systems out there right now."

Aaron Marks for Cannibal Halfling Games wrote, "Every element in this game is tightly written and evocative, so as soon as you read them you’re immediately struck with not only what the thing is, but also how insane it is."

Christopher John Eggett of the Tabletop Gaming Magazine wrote about its universe: "it's a world that’s got the structure of a joke, but without a thigh-slapping punchline; you're more likely to end up with a knowing smirk."

In his 2023 book Monsters, Aliens, and Holes in the Ground, RPG historian Stu Horvath noted, "Troika! is one too many googly eyes in an M.C. Escher landscape that periodically melts into iridescence." Horvath commented on the strange random character backgrounds, saying, "[they] imply a strange and slippery world that verges on the nonsensical."" Horvath concluded, "It's absurd. But also very charming in its way."
