= Warhead (video game) =

1989 video game

- Warhead's official cover art.
- Developer: Motion Picture House
- Publisher: Activision
- Designer: Glyn Williams
- Composer: Michael Powell
- Platforms: Amiga, Atari ST
- Release: 1989
- Genre: Space combat simulator
- Mode: Single-player

Warhead is a 3D space combat simulator for Amiga (A500 and A2000) and Atari ST platforms. It was created by British developer Glyn Williams in 1989.

The game takes place during a war between the alien forces of Sirius and the humans of Earth. The player fights for the Earth forces. The game is played as sequential missions. Completing a mission successfully lets the player advance to the next mission. It is possible to save the game status after each mission, but not during a mission. Typical mission objectives include intelligence gathering, search and rescue missions, destroying enemies and protecting friendly forces. The player is sent for missions from "SolBase", a military base orbiting the Sun. The player must travel to different solar systems using a device that allows faster than light travel through quad-space, which is a form of hyperspace.

Warhead spawned a spiritual sequel, XF5700 Mantis in 1992.

== Story ==
The story revolves around the fight between the forces of Sirius and the humans of Earth. The player has been enrolled as a fighter pilot for the "Fist of Earth" space force. The player is led to believe that the forces of Sirius have attacked humans for an unknown reason.

The enemy are an insect-like species from the star system Sirius. It is suspected that their present evolutionary form was achieved at the time there were non-avian dinosaurs on Earth. It is also theorised that insects on Earth and Sirius share the same ancestor.

No one knows why they attacked. It is only speculated that they may have wanted to reduce Earth back to the state of barbarism. It is speculated that the insects, or "Roaches" as they are called, may share a common ancestor with Earth's insects. They are a group-mind and have shared consciousness. Tens or even hundreds are required for any real intelligence. Some even argue that they are more like one entity than numerous individuals.

The group-mind is based on radio communication which is a natural property of the metallic parts in their bodies. It is speculated that spaceship manufacturing technology is relatively new for the Sirians and that the first Sirian vessel was launched in 1897 from Sirius Five.

The Earth was attacked in the year 2045 by a Sirian fleet. The invasion led to a planetary winter and three billion casualties, and within a few years a third of the Earth population died as a consequence.

Political unity and the dissolution of national borders on Earth were the results of the attack. The organisation called the "Fist of Earth" was formed to defend planet Earth. The most significant military base, "SolBase", was built in Earth's orbit. When SolBase became operational, it was moved to orbit the Sun. This was thought to be the most effective position to defend the Solar System as a whole. The Fist of Earth sent a fighter pilot navigating the FOE-57 spacecraft on a series of missions to stop the Sirians and protect humanity.

== See also ==
- XF5700 Mantis Experimental Fighter
