= Wizard Wars (video game) =

1988 video game

- Developer: Out of the Blue
- Publisher: Paragon Software
- Designers: Mark Seremet; Christopher Straka
- Platform: MS-DOS
- Release: 1988
- Genre: Role-playing
- Mode: Single-player

Wizard Wars is a 1988 role-playing video game developed by Out of the Blue and published by Paragon Software for MS-DOS.

An Amiga version was said to be available in March 1989 but it was never released. Versions for Apple II, Atari ST, Commodore 64, Commodore 128, and Macintosh were also planned.

== Gameplay ==
Wizard Wars is mostly a menu-driven turn-based role-playing game. The player is Temeres, a young wizard who aims to defeat an evil wizard named Aldorin. The game is broken up into three segments called "dimensions". In the first dimension the player searches for a variety of spells and items, the second dimension requires the player to defeat seven wizards, each inhabiting a maze. The final battle against Aldorin takes place in the third dimension.

== Reception ==
Reception

Review scores
Publication	Score
Tilt	14/20
Joystick	3/10
DOS International	6/10
Power Play	34%

Computer Gaming World said the graphics are the best part of the game and concluded: "Wizard Wars is best suited to those who want to do hack and slash and not worry about intellectual puzzles." Joystick called the menu-based gameplay limited and noted the game as boring. DOS International said the plot lacks suspense and the combat is too slow. Power Play didn't like the graphics and the gameplay and recommended to check out Gold Box series instead. Tilt liked the strategic gameplay and the graphics but criticized the game for its lack of significant sound effects. They recommended the game for experienced role-playing game fans.

== See also ==
- History of Western role-playing video games
