= Jochen Hippel =

German musician

Andreas Jochen Hippel (born October 14, 1971) is a musician from Kirchheimbolanden in southwest Germany. He played one of the most prominent roles in computer music during the 16-bit microcomputer era, composing hundreds of tunes for games and demos. He was also an experienced Amiga programmer and ported many of Thalion Software's Atari ST titles. He no longer composes music for a living and in 2006 he was working in logistics.

Jochen's first computer music was a set of Christmas songs that he arranged in a rock style on his school's Commodore 64.

As a member of The Exceptions under the handle Mad Max, he wrote most of the music for their demos including the B.I.G. Demo (Best in Galaxy). The demo was essentially a large collection of C64 tunes that was ported across to the Atari ST's Yamaha YM2149 sound chip using Jochen's own driver to get the most out of it. Jochen then had to fix all the music in order to get it to sound correct on the ST as the YM2149 has no resonance filter, no Oscillator sync, no combined waveforms, no ASDR enveloping and no ring modulation, and it has fewer waveforms than the MOS Technology 6581. Composers (such as Rob Hubbard) used a lot of special effects in their music which was difficult to replicate on the ST's sound chip.

Another note of interest is that the B.I.G. demo contained an additional demo screen entitled "The Digital Department" containing 6 digital versions of C64 tunes. The sound routine used each channel of the YM2149 as a 4-bit DAC and played samples for each instrument. This is the first time music using PCM sample instruments is heard on the Atari ST, unfortunately only one more piece of music is ever written using this routine, albeit the 16-minute-long Knuckle Busters tune by Rob Hubbard. This appears as a guest screen in the Cuddly Demos (written by The Carebears) and was used to torment Richard Karsmakers of ST News who was promptly chained to a chair as the disk was formatted before his very eyes!

He worked as a freelance musician, doing music for many 16-bit games. He eventually joined Thalion Software as a programmer and musician. His musical track for the game Amberstar is considered among his best works, and the game and Hippel's music acquired a cult following. For in game music on the Amiga Jochen often stuck to chiptune-like sound – that became his trademark – instead of using more "realistic" instrument sounds that machine's support for digitized sound made possible. Title music for Wings of Death and Lethal Xcess are exceptions.

He has released an album called Give it a Try and has composed music for other albums including tracks on Immortal 2 and Immortal 3 Amiga Immortal.

Hippel was also a programmer, he created all of his own music tools and also ported most of Thalion's early Atari ST titles to the Amiga. For his proprietary TFMX music file format as the base for his compositions, Hippel also created the Amiga 7 voices replay routine which was used in several Thalion and Eclipse titles and later used by Chris Hülsbeck in his TFMX replay routine for the title music of Turrican 2 and Turrican 3 for which he wrote the in game loading music.

== Video game music ==
Most songs which are for Atari ST only are conversions while works for both machines are usually Hippel's own compositions.

Game	Year	System(s)	Publisher	Comment
5th Gear	1988	Atari ST, Amiga	Hewson	
Amberstar	1992	Atari ST, Amiga	Thalion	
Astaroth: The Angel of Death	1989	Atari ST, Amiga	Hewson	
Atomino	1990	Atari ST	Psygnosis	
Atomix	1990	Atari ST, Amiga	Thalion	
Bad Cat	1988	Atari ST	Rainbow Arts	Original by Chris Hülsbeck
Battle Valley	1989	Amiga	Hewson	
Chambers of Shaolin	1989	Atari ST, Amiga	Thalion	
Circus Attractions	1988	Atari ST	Rainbow Arts	Original by Chris Hülsbeck
Crime Time	1990	Atari ST	Starbyte	
Crush!	1991	Atari ST	Budgie UK	
Cybernoid II – The Revenge	1989	Atari ST	Hewson	Original by Jeroen Tel
Dragonflight	1990	Atari ST, Amiga	Thalion	
Dugger	1988	Atari ST	Linel	
Enchanted Land	1990	Atari ST, Amiga	Thalion	
Ghost Battle	1991	Atari ST, Amiga	Thalion	
Grand Monster Slam	1989	Atari ST	Rainbow Arts	Original by Chris Hülsbeck
Great Courts 2	1990	Atari ST	Ubisoft	Also known as Pro Tennis Tour 2
The Great Giana Sisters	1987	Atari ST	Rainbow Arts	Original by Chris Hülsbeck
In 80 Days Around the World	1988	Atari ST	Rainbow Arts	Original by Thomas Lopatic
Insects in Space	1990	Atari ST	Hewson	
Jinks	1988	Atari ST	Rainbow Arts	Original by Chris Hülsbeck
The Last Ninja	1988	Atari ST	System 3	
Leavin' Teramis	1990	Atari ST, Amiga	Thalion	
Lethal Xcess: Wings of Death II	1991	Atari ST, Amiga	Eclipse Software	
Masterblazer	1991	Atari ST	Rainbow Arts	Original by Chris Hülsbeck
Monster Business	1991	Amiga	Eclipse Software	
MUDS – Mean Dirty Ugly Sports	1990	Atari ST	Rainbow Arts	Original by Chris Hülsbeck
Ninja Remix	1990	Atari ST, Amiga	System 3	
A Prehistoric Tale	1990	Atari ST, Amiga	Thalion	
Rings of Medusa	1989	Atari ST, Amiga	Starbyte	
Rings of Medusa II: The Return of Medusa	1991	Atari ST, Amiga	Starbyte	
Roll-Out	1989	Atari ST	Procovision	
The Seven Gates of Jambala	1989	Atari ST, Amiga	Thalion	
Starball / Spaceball	1988	Atari ST	Rainbow Arts	Original by Chris Hülsbeck
Stormlord	1989	Atari ST	Hewson	
Tangram	1991	Atari ST, Amiga	Thalion	
To Be on Top	1988	Atari ST	Rainbow Arts	Original by Chris Hülsbeck
Tom & Jerry: Hunting High and Low	1989	Atari ST	Magic Bytes	
Tom & Jerry 2	1989	Atari ST	Magic Bytes	
Tower FRA	1990	Amiga	Thalion	
Trans World	1990	Atari ST	Starbyte	
Turrican	1990	Atari ST	Rainbow Arts	Original by Chris Hülsbeck
Turrican II: The Final Fight	1991	Atari ST	Rainbow Arts	Original by Chris Hülsbeck
Turrican 3: Payment Day	1993	Amiga	Rainbow Arts	Credited for "Seven Voice Technology"
Warp	1989	Atari ST, Amiga	Thalion	
Wings of Death	1990	Atari ST, Amiga	Eclipse Software	
Z-Out	1990	Atari ST	Rainbow Arts	Original by Chris Hülsbeck

Data provided by Hall of Light, Atari Legend, Atarimania and Lemon Amiga games databases.
