= Toki (video game) =

1989 video game

- North American arcade flyer
- Developer: TAD Corporation: Ocean Software (Amiga/Atari ST/C64) Daiei Seisakusho (NES) Santos (Genesis) Atari Corporation (Lynx)
- Publishers: TAD Corporation: Arcade; NA: Fabtek Ocean Software (Amiga/Atari ST/C64) NES; JP/NA: Taito Genesis; WW: Sega Atari Corporation (Lynx)
- Designer: Haruki Kitahara
- Programmer: Akira Sakuma
- Artists: Hiro Kakiuchi; Jun Fujisaku; Jun Matsubara
- Composer: Yukihiko Kitahara
- Platform: Arcade: Amiga, Lynx, Atari ST, Commodore 64, NES, Genesis/Mega Drive
- Release: 8 December 1989: Arcade; JP: 8 December 1989; NA: 22 February 1990 Amiga; EU: 1991 Atari ST; EU: 1991 Commodore 64; EU: 1991 NES; JP: 19 July 1991; NA: December 1991 Genesis; JP: 31 January 1992; NA: 1992; EU: April 1992 Lynx; EU: February 1992; NA: March 1992
- Genre: Platform
- Modes: Single-player; multiplayer

Toki (Note: Also known as JuJu Densetsu (Japanese: JuJu伝説, Hepburn: JuJu legend or Legend of Juju) in Japan.) is a run and gun platform game released in arcades in Japan in 1989 by TAD Corporation. It was published in North America by Fabtek. Designed by Akira Sakuma, the game has tongue-in-cheek humor mixed with the action. The player controls an enchanted ape who must battle hordes of jungle monsters with energy balls from his mouth. The ultimate goal is to destroy the evil wizard who cast a spell on the title protagonist; thereby transforming him from an ape back into a human, and rescuing the kidnapped princess. The game was ported to several video game consoles and home computers.

== Gameplay ==
Arcade version screenshot

The player must traverse several levels with a miniboss at the end. Despite his apparent handicap, his slowness as an ape, and the fact that almost any attack can kill him, Toki is able to spit powerful shots that will help him in defeating enemies and obstacles that try to slow him down in his mission. There is a timer for each stage.

Toki can make use of items such as power-ups for his spit; lucky rabbit feet which can give Toki bursts of superhuman agility and jumping skill; clocks which add extra time to the countdown; fruit which can add to Toki's bonus points; keys which unlock bonus areas; a special helmet that protects him from upwards attacks (the helmet rather comically resembles an American football helmet); extra lives; and magic coins (food in the Genesis version) which when collected in abundance can obtain Toki an extra life.

== Plot ==
The protagonist of the game is a muscular, loincloth-wearing, Tarzanesque tribesman named Toki (known in Japan and in some ports as JuJu), who up until recently lived a primitive yet contented life in the jungles of a vast and wild island in the South Seas.

This all ends tragically when the beautiful Miho, princess of Toki's tribe of jungle men, and a potential suitor to Toki, is kidnapped by the treacherous witch doctor Vookimedlo. Miho is taken to a vast golden palace at the summit of the island, which Vookimedlo has conjured up for himself to reside in. The wicked shaman then casts a spell to transform all the human inhabitants of the island into various animals and beasts, before they can defend themselves against the evil magic.

Toki himself is transformed into a Geeshergam, one of the ape-like minions of Vookimedlo, although in his primate form, Toki more resembles a gorilla. Fortunately, the great warrior discovers that he is still in control of his own faculties and as an unexpected side effect of the spell cast on him, he can breathe fire and shoot forth various projectiles from his mouth.

Toki then sets off on a quest to pursue and defeat Vookimedlo, rescue princess Miho, and undo the curse which has befallen the island. However, to reach Vookimedlo's golden palace, Toki will have to travel through murky lakes, steep canyons, over frozen ice-capped mountain ranges and lava-spewing volcanoes alike. To progress in his quest and be ultimately victorious, Toki will have to battle all manner of dangerous wild animals and various mutants of Vookimedlo's creation; not to mention Vookimedlo's own abominable guardians who act as level bosses.

== Ports ==
Within the next two years ports were released for home systems. Ocean Software published versions for the Amiga, Atari ST, and Commodore 64, They advertised versions for the ZX Spectrum and Amstrad CPC and the Spectrum version was previewed in issue 90 of CRASH, but neither port materialized. Taito published ports for the Lynx and the NES. The latter version was slightly altered and has a health bar so that Toki doesn't die after one hit.

Sega developed an exclusive version for the Mega Drive/Genesis: Toki: Going Ape Spit. This version lacks the non-spit power-ups, but it has additional levels and more detailed graphics compared to the NES version.

In some ports, Toki is named "JuJu", Miho is named "Wanda" and Vookimedlo is named "Dr. Stark". Also, in some ports it is not Vookimedlo who kidnaps princess Miho, but his chief henchman, the half-invisible giant known as Bashtar. In some ports Bashtar is the final boss of the game, and not Vookimedlo.

== Reception ==
In North America, Toki was ranked second among arcade games in a January 1990 equipment survey by Play Meter, while RePlay listed it in its January 1990 issue as being the second most-popular arcade game of the previous month. In Japan, Game Machine listed it on their March 15, 1990 issue as being the fifth most-popular arcade game for the previous two weeks. It received a generally favorable reception from critics. Computer and Video Games considered the game difficult but fun and addictive. The Games Machine's Mark Caswell felt the game was very playable and worth checking out. Henrik Fisch and Martin Gaksch, from Power Play, opined that it was a beautiful, varied, imaginative and very entertaining arcade game. Tilt's Alain Huyghues-Lacour stated that "Toki is an arcade game unlike any other; it will appeal to all fans of classic Japanese games, like Super Mario Bros." Hardcore Gaming 101's Kurt Kalata proclaimed that "There were plenty of prehistoric themed sidescrollers in the late 80s/early 90s (...) but none are as quite as delightfully deranged as Toki".

=== Home computers ===
Reception (Home computers)

Review scores
| Publication | Score | |
| Publication | Amiga | Atari ST |
|---|---|---|
| ACE | 805/1000 | N/A |
| Amiga Action | 86%, 58% | N/A |
| Amiga Force | 88/100 | N/A |
| Amiga Format | 78%, 86% | N/A |
| Amiga Power | 87%, 83% | N/A |
| Computer and Video Games | 82/100 | N/A |
| Games-X | 4.5/5 | N/A |
| ST Action | N/A | 87% |
| ST Format | N/A | 78%, 81% |
| ST Review | N/A | 5/5 |
| The One | 88% | 88% |
| Zero | 88/100 | N/A |
| Atari ST User | N/A | 89% |
| CU Amiga | 83%, 81% | N/A |

Toki won the "Best Coin-Op Conversion" award at the 1991 Golden Joystick Awards. The Amiga version received generally favorable reception from critics.

The Atari ST version also received generally favorable reviews.

The Commodore 64 version was also generally well received.

=== Consoles ===
Reception (Consoles)

Review scores
| Publication | Score | |
| Publication | Atari Lynx | Sega Genesis |
|---|---|---|
| AllGame | 2.5/5 | N/A |
| Beep! MegaDrive | N/A | 5.5/10 |
| Computer and Video Games | N/A | 85/100 |
| Electronic Gaming Monthly | 8/10, 7/10, 7/10, 8/10 | N/A |
| Famitsu | N/A | 6/10, 5/10, 6/10, 4/10 |
| Games-X | 4.5/5 | 3/5 |
| IGN | 7/10 | N/A |
| Mean Machines Sega | N/A | 47% |
| ST Format | 92% | N/A |
| VideoGames & Computer Entertainment | 9/10 | N/A |
| The Atari Times | 70% | N/A |
| Console XS | N/A | 77/100 |
| Electric Brain | N/A | 85% |
| Game Zero Magazine | 80.5/100 | N/A |
| Game Zone | 91/100 | 73/100 |
| Go! Hand-Held Video Games | 85/100 | N/A |
| Mean Machines | N/A | 47% |
| Mega | N/A | 78% |
| Mega Drive Advanced Gaming | N/A | 69% |
| MegaTech | N/A | 80% |
| Sega Force | N/A | 73% |
| Sega Power | N/A | 69% |
| Sega Pro | N/A | 78%/100 |

The Nintendo Entertainment System (NES) version received a score of 19.6/30 in a readers' poll conducted by Family Computer Magazine. The NES version received mixed reviews. Famitsu's four reviewers considered it a "memorization game" due to its high difficulty. The reviewers also noted its weird setting and found the protagonist unappealing. They commented that, despite having a unique charm, it was just an average action game. Ichirō Tezuka of Hippon Super! found the game challenging and felt it could have been fun if the gameplay was more enjoyable. Italian publication Game Power labelled it as mediocre, citing its ugly visuals, inadequate sound, and low difficulty.

The Sega Genesis/Mega Drive version received a 6.0833/10 score in a 1995 readers' poll conducted by the Japanese Sega Saturn Magazine, ranking among Genesis/Mega Drive titles at number 389. The Genesis/Mega Drive version was also met with a mixed critical reception.

The Atari Lynx version was received favorably.

== Legacy ==
The original game, ported by Magic Team, was released for iOS on September 7, 2009 in the United States.

A remake was published by Microids in 2018 for Nintendo Switch, followed by versions for Windows, PlayStation 4, Xbox One, and Luna.
