= Ghost Battle =

1991 video game

- Developer(s): Interactive Design
- Publisher(s): Thalion Software
- Programmer(s): Erwin Kloibhofer
- Artist(s): Henk Nieborg
- Composer(s): Jochen Hippel
- Platform(s): Amiga, Atari ST
- Release: EU: 1991
- Genre(s): Platform
- Mode(s): Single-player

Ghost Battle is a platform game developed by Interactive Design and published in 1991 by Thalion Software for the Amiga and ported to the Atari ST. It was developed by Austrian programmer Erwin Kloibhofer and Dutch graphic designer Henk Nieborg who were hired by Thalion after the game was published. Ghost Battle was influenced by Ghosts 'n Goblins, Green Beret, and various horror films. The pair later developed Lionheart (1993).

== Gameplay ==
The game is a side-scrolling platformer that consists of five levels. Three difficulty levels can be chosen at the beginning: easy, normal, hard. The player is a barbarian that has wandered into an evil forest and witnesses a princess being captured. The barbarian can throw rocks and bombs at the enemies. Additional weapons are available that are guarded by monsters.

== Reception ==
Reception

Review scores
Publication	Score
Aktueller Software Markt	4/12 (Amiga); 5/12 (ST)
Amiga Action	78%
Amiga Format	69%
Games-X	3/5 (Amiga, ST)
The One	77% (Amiga)

Ghost Battle received generally average reviews from critics. Amiga Action recommended the game overall but didn't like the slow movement of the main character and the badly translated manual. Amiga Format praised the puzzles, graphics and soundtrack. Games-X compared the game to Horror Zombies from the Crypt (1990). Graphics and sound were praised, the gameplay was said to be uninteresting at first but getting better over time. The One found the music to be the game's best feature. Graphics were described as nothing special, gameplay as "largely uninspired", and controls as "very finicky".
