= Tangram (video game) =

1991 video game

- Developer(s): Thalion Software
- Publisher(s): Thalion Software
- Designer(s): Thorsten Mutschall
- Composer(s): Jochen Hippel
- Platform(s): Amiga, Atari ST
- Release: EU: 1991
- Genre(s): Puzzle
- Mode(s): Single-player, multiplayer

Tangram is a 1991 puzzle video game developed and published by Thalion Software for the Amiga and Atari ST.

== Gameplay ==
Tangram is based on the ancient Chinese game of the same name. The player has to rotate seven geometric forms to arrange them on top of a colored area. This area must be precisely covered in the allotted time. The game includes a total of 200 puzzles of varying complexity. Score is calculated based on remaining time. In the bonus round, identical blocks must be matched, again more points are awarded the quicker the round is cleared. Password system is also included.

== Reception ==
Reception

Review scores
Publication	Score
Aktueller Software Markt	9/12 (Amiga, ST)
Amiga Action	52%
Amiga Format	60%
Games-X	4/5

Aktueller Software Markt gave a positive review and said the game is particularly suitable for the younger computer users for its ease of use and because it promotes logical and geometric thinking. Games-X called the game addictive and suitable for players of all ages. Amiga Action praised the graphics and sound but concluded: "Tangram is just so unbelievably simple, and it becomes very repetitive after just a few goes." Amiga Format summarized: "Solidly constructed, Tangram is more functional than inspirational.", and further said it "[l]acks the goals and player pressure that make it for classic puzzle games."
