= Monster Business =

1991 video game

- Developer: Eclipse Software Design
- Publisher: Ascon
- Programmer: Fabian Hammer
- Artists: Michael Grohe; Tim Lange; Sven Bauer
- Composers: Laurens Tummers; John Tonnard
- Platforms: Amiga, Atari ST
- Release: 1991
- Genre: Platform
- Modes: Single-player, multiplayer

Monster Business is a 1991 vertically scrolling platform game developed by Eclipse Software Design and published by Ascon that was released for the Amiga and Atari ST.

== Plot ==
The Mad Meanies, a group of mutated monsters, have invaded construction sites owned by Mr. Bob, stealing the worker's tools and preventing work from being done on the sites. Mr. Bob hires the Beastie Busters, led by Leroy, to clear the construction sites of monsters and retrieve the stolen tools.

== Gameplay ==
The player must defeat monsters by inflating them, while platforming to the top of the level.

Monster Business is a vertically-scrolling platformer wherein the player takes the role of Leroy, the leader of the Beastie Busters, and must remove monsters from a construction yard by inflating them using a pump. The player must platform to the top of each level before the time limit runs out, while also defeating all monsters in the level and avoiding hazards such as holes in the scaffolding. While climbing diagonal slopes, the player is vulnerable to monsters as the pump cannot be used on slopes, and if the player stops moving while on a slope, they slide down to the bottom and become temporarily stunned.

The game spans forty-five levels which increase in difficulty as the game progresses, and new monsters are introduced in later levels. When the player runs out of lives, they are given the option to continue four times, after which if they die again, they lose the game, and must start over from level one. To inflate monsters, the player must get close to them without being hit and start pumping. The inflated monsters slowly float skywards and knock other creatures off the construction scaffolding if they are hit. When a monster is defeated, it drops tools that Leroy can collect for additional points. Crates spread throughout the level have bonuses that give varied positive effects to the player when collected, such as a temporary boost in jump height. The game has two-player alternating multiplayer, with the second player beginning their turn once the first player loses.

== Development ==
Both the Amiga and the Atari ST versions of the game were bundled on the same disk, not released separately. A prototype Commodore 64 version was tested by Tilt magazine, and was set to release in mid-July 1991, but never materialized.

== Reception ==
Reception

Review scores
Publication	Score
Amiga Power	5/5 (Amiga); 80% (Amiga)
New Computer Express	5/5 (Amiga, Atari ST)
Tilt	4.5/5 (Amiga, Atari ST)
ACE	4/5 (Amiga)
Amiga DOS	78% (Amiga)
Joystick	76% (Atari ST)
Aktueller Software Markt	9/12 (Atari ST)
Amiga Joker	74% (Amiga)
The One for ST Games	69% (Atari ST)
CU Amiga	68% (Amiga)
Games-X	3/5 (Amiga)
Amiga Computing	58% (Amiga)
Power Play	54% (Amiga)
Amiga Action	35% (Amiga)

Monster Business received mixed reviews from critics, with some praising its simple arcade-style gameplay as 'addictive and fun', and others finding it 'unoriginal' and 'repetitive'. CU Amiga criticized Monster Business's 'lack of variety' in its gameplay, but said it was "mildly enjoyable" nonetheless, calling the game "innocent fun in an uncomplicated way". Games-X praised its gameplay as "fairly addictive and mindless fun", but expressed that while initially pleasant, the gameplay "soon becomes boring and fairly tedious" and its music becomes grating. Despite this, Games-X expressed that each new level motivated them to want to complete it, and that the game is "good value" due to having both the Amiga and ST versions on one disk, and being cheaper than other games.

Stuart Campbell, writing for Amiga Power, praised Monster Business's gameplay, calling it "simple, comical, fun and addictive", and praised its difficulty curve, further stating that the game "plays like all the best arcade games". In a review of the game in New Computer Express, Campbell described it as "the most fun I've had with a computer game since I started writing for games magazines", calling its gameplay "magnificently designed", and described the game as a cross between Dig Dug and Snow Bros. Campbell highly praised the game's music, and expressed that he'd "never heard anything sound this good on an ST, and nothing this good actually during a game on any machine". Monster Business was 98th on Amiga Power's list of "All-Time Top 100" games in 1992, calling the game "simple but emotionally involving".

The One for ST Games criticized the game's "cute" artstyle as generic, saying that they give the feeling of having "seen it all before", consequently lowering their expectations for the game. The One noted that the game felt "aimed at a younger audience", and that there are better games for older audiences, calling Monster Business "mostly forgettable". Amiga Computing criticized the game as 'outdated' and boring, stating that it would be "more suited to the ZX Spectrum some six or seven years ago", and said that its playability "is just not there .. what starts off as vaguely diverting soon gets repetitive". Amiga Computing expressed that they expected better due to the owner of Eclipse Software Design being a programmer with "close involvement with the project", but was disappointed.

ACE called Monster Business "the epitome of the average arcade game [with] stupid graphics and a doubly stupid premise", and stated that while it's 'idiotic', the game is "actually quite good". ACE praised the game's varied hazards on each level, music, and "smart" graphics, concluding by calling Monster Business "an example of what arcade games should be about".
