= Lionheart (video game) =

1993 video game

- Cover art by Dieter Rottermund
- Developer: Thalion Software
- Publisher: Thalion Software
- Designer: Erik Simon
- Programmers: Erwin Kloibhofer; Michael Bittner
- Artist: Henk Nieborg
- Writer: Jurie Horneman
- Composer: Matthias Steinwachs
- Platform: Amiga
- Release: 1993
- Genre: Platform
- Mode: Single-player

Lionheart is a platform game for the Amiga developed and self-published by German video game developer Thalion Software in 1993. Using a fantasy motif, the game takes place in the land of the Cat People, a race of feline humanoids, who are threatened by the evil Norka. The player assumes control of Valdyn, an outlaw swordsman who is also known as "Lionheart". Players have to fight their way through 14 levels filled with monsters and environmental hazards. Most of the gameplay is melee combat and precision platforming.

== Gameplay ==
The first level

Lionheart is a 2D action-platformer. Players move from left to right fighting their way through levels filled with monsters and environmental hazards like water, chasms, lava and fireballs. Valdyn can run, jump, crouch, swing and climb bits of the scenery. When running downhill, Valdyn gains speed which enables him to jump much further than normally. There are also ropes and slopes to slide down, but then he cannot get back up the way he came, so they should be approached with care. Combat is an important part of the game. Valdyn is armed with a sword and is able to perform several attack moves, including a high strike, a middle strike, a low kick, a reverse strike (which enables him to swirl around and attack enemies behind him), a jump strike and a downward strike (where Valdyn jumps in the air and then slams down into the ground using his sword).

The game is divided into 14 levels, some of which feature end-of-level boss fights. At first, the player has four health points, three lives and two continue options. Health points are lost whenever Valdyn is hit, and a life is lost whenever health reaches zero, or Valdyn suffers a fatality as in when falling into a chasm. There are a number of power-ups (usually in hidden sections of each level) like "Energy Drinks" that replenish health, and "Life Spheres" which grant more lives. Each level has several "Energy Crystals" which the player can collect. Every 100th crystal "unlocks" one life point out of four more available; optimal performance means that the player can have a maximum of eight life points before the end of the game, making survival easier. The player can also find more powerful swords; the more powerful a sword, the less hits are required to kill a stronger opponent.

There are three difficulty levels. The harder levels feature harder opponents, but also differently designed environments, offering an additional gameplay experience. Moreover, many of the stages are significantly expanded, resulting in an even longer game than before.

== Plot ==
One day, Valdyn was gambling in his favorite inn when a group of royal guards arrived and arrested him. After an unpleasant time in the palace's dungeon, he is summoned by the King and is assigned a quest: the Lionheart, the holiest (and titular) relic of the Cat People and center of their religion, has been stolen by thieves sent by the evil Norka. If the King is not able to demonstrate his divine right to rule by publicly displaying the holy relic in the upcoming Showing Festival, he will be forced to abdicate and be replaced by his arch-chancellor Nargle. Furthermore, the night the Lionheart was stolen, Valdyn's beloved Ilene was praying in the Temple's entrance chamber and the thieves turned her to stone using a very rare poison which can only be found in Norka's country. If there is a cure, Norka's domain would be the place to look. Based on his nickname, the priests declare that Valdyn is destined to reclaim the jewel and escort him to the temple to prepare him for his quest.

In the introduction, Valdyn is given a flying dragon but on his way to Norka's country, he is abducted by a flying ship. Valdyn escapes and is forced to travel on foot. The first few levels feature an environment of swamps and caves before Valdyn reaches a city in Norka's domain. A "volcano level" follows, which includes a hidden level where the player can gain several power-ups and an amulet. In the following level Valdyn finds a dinosaur-like steed running after Norka's flying ship. Valdyn frees his dragon, and rides it towards Norka's flying fortress in a level that resembles a horizontally scrolling shooter. The final levels feature Valdyn climbing to the top of the fortress and his final confrontation with Norka. The game epilogue has Valdyn return the Lionheart in the Temple, still grieving for Ilene, but in the optimal ending, if the player has found the amulet in the earlier hidden level, Valdyn is able to heal Ilene.

== Development ==
When starting at Thalion me and Erwin each got a small cubicle to work in next to each other with no windows in it. There was a door present btw. It didn't really stop us from doing our job as we didn't need much. I moved to Germany of course just like Erwin and had to sleep the first half-year in the office on a mattress and occasionally taking a shower at Eric Simon's house (producer of Thalion Software back then). We spent countless hours playing new PC-Engine, Mega Drive and Super Famicom imports and visiting the arcade hall to check out new games. This was around 1991. Golden age of video games IMO.

— Henk Nieborg in a 2019 interview with Arcade-Attack

After finishing Ghost Battle (1991) as freelancers, Austrian programmer Erwin Kloibhofer and Dutch graphic designer Henk Nieborg got an in-house job at Thalion. According to Nieborg, "landing your first real job in the gaming industry was pretty much unreal to me". He also said that "Eric Simon (producer/artist/designer) at Thalion somehow recognized our talent and had bigger plans for us. A thing we didn't see in ourselves yet". Kloibhofer and Nieborg were fans of Japanese action games like Super Mario, Castlevania, Super Contra, Super Ghouls 'n Ghosts and Castle of Illusion. Thalion producer Eric Simon describes Lionheart as a game "created out of passion". It was a project born from the desire of Kloibhofer and Nieborg to make "a really outstanding action game for the Amiga", the type of game "that we would buy ourselves on a console".

Just before joining Thalion, Nieborg drew a 16-color tileset/background and designed the protagonist of the game, Valdyn, on his Amiga 500 as preliminary work for their next project. Development for the game began in November 1991 with Thalion having two major goals. From a technical and graphical standpoint, they wanted to do what they've been doing since their demoscene days and push the hardware to its limits. In terms of gameplay, they wanted to test and showcase all the experience and skills they had cultivated over the years, since they decided to make the transition into game development. Erik Simon called it an "ambitious" and "non profit-oriented" project, openly admitting in a 1993 interview that, even though "we hope to get our development costs back, we don't believe in it". In terms of inspiration, Kloibhofer and Nieborg noted "we are of course aware that the best action games come from Japan. So we thought it made more sense to immerse ourselves in the best console games than in the best home computer games".

According to Kloibhofer and Nieborg, Erik Simon had the idea for Lionheart and also "edited and designed practically the entire game". As they recall, "Eric really pushed our talent in a positive way and the level of quality compared to our first game 'Ghost Battle' was almost unreal when you put them side by side". In a 2002 interview, Erik Simon described the development process as "one of these rare projects where everything just came together perfectly", saying that he was grateful to work on Lionheart. Erwin Kloibhofer was the main programmer, while Henk Nieborg was the visual artist during the development. Michael Bittner was responsible for intro and the 3D scrolling, while Matthias Steinwachs scored the soundtrack. Jurie Horneman wrote the story and also provided ideas for the game and Dieter Rottermund was in charge of the cover illustration. In the March 1993 issue of Play Time, Kloibhofer and Nieborg mention that also helpful were Matthias Mörstedt, "the master of sound routines", as well as Wolfgang Breyha and Reinhardt Franz, "without whom the program would not run on 1 MB machines".

According to Simon, the game's parallax scrolling didn't require any demo-style programming, as "Erwin and Michael were just very skilled 68000 programmers who knew exactly what they were doing", adding that "much of Lionheart's routines, where processing speed was of minor importance, were even written in C". Regarding the soundtrack, Simon recalls that "at that time [Matthias] already had a lot of experience and was able to produce a very orchestral sound that required little storage space". During the development of the game, Nieborg was very eager to learn and improve on the quality of his pixel art by gazing through many traditional artbooks, citing the work of artists like Roger Dean and Rodney Matthews as some of his key influences for the game's aesthetic. He said that "their style really struck me like nothing else and was a huge inspiration for Lionheart and some other titles after that as well". Regarding the use of color, Simon explains that "instead of doing color transitions using the Copper list only for the background, I suggested using it for the foreground graphics as well. It just depends on using the right color tables and only changing one color at a time so that the eye does not notice the horizontal color changes".

The game looked so impressive that during one of the first demonstrations of the Amiga 1200 in Frankfurt, "the managers of Commodore actually believed that Lionheart was made specifically for the Amiga 1200" and its AGA graphic chipset. According to Nieborg, Lionheart "really shines because it benefits from all of the Amiga's graphical and technical features", describing the game as "tailor-made for that system". In a 2019 interview, he said that he is still proud of Lionheart and he considered the game as a ticket into video game development when he started on the project.

== Release ==
Lionheart was supposed to be ready in the summer of 1992, but "when the quality of the game began to show", Thalion's managing director, Willi Carmincke, "was also enthusiastic", and the game was postponed to Christmas release date. The game was eventually released in January 1993 and Thalion explicitly used it to test if the piracy-ridden Amiga market was able to sustain ambitious action games. The development team stated that, if the Amiga users decide to copy a game with so much effort put into it, then "Lionheart will be our last action game on the Amiga. But before we have to say goodbye to the Amiga, we want to make sure that we are at least missed".

In a 1993 interview with The One, Erik Simon said that Thalion didn't even bother copy-protecting Lionheart, "because there's no point in simply delaying the pirates from cracking the games and sticking them on bulletin boards. If the Amiga users don't change their way of thinking about pirating games, the machine will disappear from the market. We're trying to offer a fair amount of quality and we don't copy protect our games because we don't want to punish honest customers with funny protection methods. Copy protection won't change people's minds".

== Reception ==
Reception

Review scores
Publication	Score
Amiga Action	82%
Amiga Computing	85%
Amiga Force	90%
Amiga Format	87%
Amiga Joker	88%
Amiga Power	87%
ASM	83%
CU Amiga	84%
CVG	92%
GamesMaster	90%
The One Amiga	91%

GamesMaster described Lionheart as "a technical marvel which looks, sounds and plays like a dream". They praised the number of moves the player can perform and the fact that they are all useful depending on the situation, comparing Valdyn's diverse moveset to what players would find in a fighting game. They called the graphics "astounding", arguing that "Thalion have squeezed all the graphic power out of the Amiga" and praised the game's audio for offering "high quality atmospheric music" and "very convincing sound effects". They rated it 90%, concluding that "it's very hard to find anything bad to say about it", and "with all the cutesy platform games that seem to be the rage right now, it's nice to see an old fashioned hacker popping up. Sure, it's not a new theme, but this far exceeds anything else in the genre".

The One agreed and gave Lionheart an overall score of 91%, stating that it's "without a doubt, the finest example of its kind, mainly because it actually tries to introduce some degree of originality into the gameplay rather than simply being content to just bombard the gamer with large sprawling levels and calling it 'a challenge' ... The variety of the game is amazing - one minute you can be swinging from vines, hacking at monsters, the next leaping up a giant tower as a bursting river creeps higher". The One praised the diversity of the levels, as well as the difficulty levels' feature where the layout of platforms differ on different modes of difficulty, stating they "provide a level of longevity the likes of which we haven't seen before". They also praised the convenient placement of checkpoints, and the music, calling it "amazingly orchestrated".

According to Computer and Video Games, "Thalion has gone and turned in an extremely challenging variation on the old theme", with "excellent graphics" and enough depth "to keep you going for weeks". On top of that, "the double ending gives the player extra incentive to play the game beyond completion". They gave it a score of 92%, with Paul Anglin commenting that "the only slight niggle I have with Lionheart is that some parts of the game are so frustratingly hard that it takes ages before you can even see what you're supposed to do, let alone actually be able to do it", but also said that Lionheart is "excellent" game. Amiga Force had similar feelings about the game. They called it "good news for just about everybody", explaining that "hard drive owners will be chuffed because it's installable; platform freaks will love it 'coz there's plenty of precipices to topple and bounce from; arcade fans will be dribbling over all the things you can kill", and said it is "fast, fun, frantic and good to look at. Lionheart excels in all aspects". They gave it a score of 90% noting that, if they had to criticize anything, it would be "the absence of level codes" and the fact that "occasionally certain moves are tricky to access".

Amiga Format described the game's graphics as "gob-smacking" with lots of colours and brilliant parallax scrolling, stating that "if there was ever a game to match (and even better) the best console graphics, then it's Lionheart". They also praised the soundtrack for "adding a real cinema-like air to it all" and the game's animation, "particularly the motion blur on the sword, and the dynamic movement as [Valdyn] turns and slashes". Despite the praise, they noticed that using the low kick can be "a little sluggish" and that sometimes "the objects and enemies can get confused with the scenery". They gave the game a score of 87% concluding that Thalion created "one of the best platform beat-em-ups ever, on console or computer (...) a graphical masterpiece with enough gameplay to keep you going for weeks on end". CU Amiga rated it 84% arguing that "there really isn't anything new here", but they praised the game's "attention to detail and feeling of quality that you get when you play". They called the animation "excellent", noting that "Valdyn's teetering on a ledge when he needs to jump not only looks impressive but also becomes an integral part of the game" and said that the fans of arcade adventures will appreciate this title.

ASM described Lionheart's presentation as "breathtaking", praising its smooth frame rate, graphics and animation, particularly the movement of the monsters. They also found its use of parallax scrolling to be "unparalleled" on the Amiga and commended the level design for introducing elements which felt like "a breath of fresh air" in a very worn out genre void of much originality. They rated it 83% stating that, while Lionheart isn't the quantum leap that Thalion wanted it to be, it's "definitely one step ahead of its competition". Amiga Action agreed, explaining that "it is the attention to detail and the amount of thought that has obviously gone into it that brings it to the top of the pile", giving it 82%. They praised the game's combat pointing out that "there are plenty of different attacks that you can perform and learning how and when to carry them out will undoubtedly take a little time". They felt that the graphics were "top-notch with some great sprites and parallax scrolling" and praised Thalion's work in the level design for keeping the game interesting throughout, noting that "thankfully, with so many levels, the designers have provided us with a fair amount of variation between each one".

== Legacy ==
Valdyn is a playable character in Ambermoon, a 1993 role-playing video game also from Thalion. He is a Ranger.

An avid fan from France has programmed several versions of Lionheart for Windows. "Lionheart Remake Evolved" expands the game using additional graphics provided by Henk Nieborg. On the other hand, "Lionheart Remake Enhanced" attempts to provide a faithful port of the original game, while offering options like higher resolutions and transparencies in place of interlacing effects. The same author has started another remake in Java, which promises better compatibility.

Following the release of Lionheart, Erwin Kloibhofer, Henk Nieborg and Matthias Steinwachs created Flink (1994) for the Mega Drive. In 1996, Kloibhofer and Nieborg collaborated one last time on Lomax for the PlayStation and Windows.
