= ProSoccer 2190 =

1990 video game

- Publisher: Vulture Publishing Ltd
- Platforms: Amiga, Atari ST
- Release: WW: 1990
- Genre: Sports
- Modes: Single-player, Multiplayer

ProSoccer 2190 is a 1990 sports video game developed and published by Vulture Publishing Ltd for Amiga and Atari ST personal computers. Upon release, the game received negative reviews.

== Gameplay ==
Gameplay

Players compete in futuristic soccer matches with teams of eleven players. The objective of the game is to score as many goals against the other team across a match, divided into four quarters of fifteen game minutes. The game contains two modes, including an arcade mode where players assume a role as a member of their team and participate in the game, or a management mode that allows the computer to kick and score for the player. During matches, players can manage their team by making substitutions with other team members. The game supports a local multiplayer option allowing players to compete with another using the keyboard.

== Reception ==
Reception

Review scores
Publication	Score	
Publication	Amiga	Atari ST
Aktueller Software Markt	1/10	1/10
Amiga Action	36%	
Amiga User International	25%	
ST Action		1/5
ST Format		12%
Amiga Joker	4%	

ProSoccer 2190 received generally negative reviews from critics, with several publications describing the game as a flop, and Amiga Action listing the game as the worst sports title on the system. Several critics faulted the game's visual presentation and sound design, with Amiga Action critiquing the "simplistic" and "badly animated" characters, considering the overall quality to be "comparable to that of an 8-bit counterpart". The gameplay and controls were also critiqued, with Atari User Magazine describing the game's controls as "sluggish" and "heavy handed".
