= Terramex =

- Terramex ad poster, 1988
- Developer: Teque Software
- Publishers: Grandslam Interactive; DataSoft; Bug Byte Premier (re-release); Zafiro (re-release)
- Designers: Mark Charles Rogers; Chris Kerry
- Programmers: Shaun Hollingworth; Peter Harrap
- Artist: Steinar Lund
- Composer: Ben Daglish
- Platforms: Atari ST; Amiga; Amstrad CPC; Commodore 64/128; MSX; ZX Spectrum; Acorn Archimedes
- Release: 1988
- Genre: Platformer
- Mode: Single player

Terramex is a 1988 action platform game developed by Teque Software and published by Grandslam Interactive in Europe. It was published by DataSoft in the US as Cosmic Relief: Prof. Renegade to the Rescue. Coded by Peter Harrap and Shaun Hollingworth with its music produced by Ben Daglish, it was the subsequent game to Death Wish 3 as the developers sought to do something light but interesting.

The game follows the player choosing one of the five playable characters to search for Professor Renegade (or Eyestrain), who was in a secret laboratory at the time. The objective is to save the planet Earth from an asteroid crash by convincing Renegade to build an anti-asteroid deflector that will prevent the catastrophe. The game was released for home computers such as Atari ST, Amiga, Amstrad CPC, Commodore 64, MSX, ZX Spectrum and Acorn Archimedes.

== Gameplay ==
A tricky platform side-scrolling adventure game, Terramex starts with the player asked to choose one of the five adventurers for the journey to find Professor Renegade at his secret laboratory. All the five adventurers are namely Henri Beaucoup (France), Wilbur Fortisque–Smithe (UK), Wu Pong (Japan), Big John Caine (US) and Hans Krusche (Germany).

The selected character will then be accompanied with a number of load bearing native bearers who will assist by picking up the items as the character walks over them. These items are left from the previous failed expeditions as the trail is perilous with dangers such as prehistoric birds e.g., Pterodactyl-like creatures, acid rain, poisonous snakes and mutants. One of the items called a key item, unique for each character, must be collected by the player to complete the mission. Once all the items are collected, it needs to be given to Renegade who will use them to construct the positronic asteroid deflector (PAD). If any of the items required to make the deflector is found to be missing, the player will need to go back into the map and find the missing items. When an item is collected by the player, the points are awarded and updated on screen.

Wilbur Fortisque-Smithe, holds an item to attack a flying lizard. The status on bottom left show no. of lives and scores that get updated with each item collected, and on bottom right show native bearers who keep the items for the adventurer on their journey.

An item to be used by the adventurer is held by exchanging the currently held item with the one to be used. The item in use can then be used to ward off any dangers or avoid obstacles for e.g., Vacuum cleaner can be used for spring cleaning and to fly above the clouds to avoid acid rain. All the possible items in the game are namely unicycle, flashgun, cricket ball, spurs, beer barrel, umbrella, party manifesto, bellows, cannon, vacuum cleaner, acme expanding bridge, flute, silver lining, spring, secret formula, switch, red button, battery, coat hanger, trampoline, atomic pile, anti radiation pins, cup of tea, energy crystal, balloon, gunpowder, silver cross and bucket. Also the key items for each character (in pairs) are Beaucoup (Unicycle), Fortisque–Smithe (Cricket ball), Pong (Flash camera), Caine (Spurs) and Krusche (Beer barrel).

There is a timer to complete the mission and it is of total 30 days when the player starts the mission, and it should be completed before the timer runs out at which the asteroid collision is inevitable. The player has three lives and must avoid any obstacles to lose them one at a time. Also there are special features within the game that were adapted from previous games made by the developers for e.g., "T" or "Think Command", inspired from 1984 adventure platformer Monty Mole, can be typed to see a thought bubble of the adventurer which shows the next item that needs to be collected. It can be misleading though as the items need to be collected in the right order and the thought item may not be the correct one to collect next. Also the adventurer can get clueless when they shrug after pressing the button.

== Plot ==
Professor Albert Renegade (pun surname Eyestrain), the inventor of the Swiss Army farm animal, had predicted in a farewell letter that an asteroid was heading towards Earth and will complete its course in 40 years, 11 months and 3 days at 4:14 am (Rocky Mountain Time). The scientific community and rest of the world rejected his claims because of which he went into hiding deep into a desert and thus away from the public eye. A month before the asteroid's impact, a group of five people decided to contact Renegade for help as he was the only person on the planet capable enough to build something to destroy it.

Currently located in the deserted high mountains of Tibet, the person selected from the five main characters searches for items and battles different obstacles to navigate the course until they reach a secret laboratory where Renegade is present. These items are then used by Renegade to build a Positron Asteroid Detector (PAD) which is an anti-asteroid device. The PAD is then used for deflecting the incoming asteroid to a different planet, doing which successfully saves Earth.

== Reception ==
Reception

Review scores
Publication	Score
ACE	808/1000
Computer and Video Games	7/10
Sinclair User	10/10
Your Sinclair	9/10
Zzap!64	31%

After the release, it received a mostly positive response from critics across different game magazines namely Compute!, Sinclair User, Your Sinclair, Zzap!64, Commodore User, Computer and Video Games (CVG), Amiga User International (AUI), Advanced Computer Entertainment (ACE), Atari ST User, Amiga Resource, The Games Machine (TGM), and Australian Commodore and Amiga Review (ACAR). CVG found the game graphics on 16 bit machines to be "excellent", and also found the game to have finer detailing for e.g., If the character is asked to carry out a dangerous jump, it shakes its head reluctantly but on second ask it performs the jump. For Zzap64, the reviewers were critical of the game and found it to be "badly crippled by a series of moronic and ambiguous puzzles" and that the problems appear to be "a long series of programmers' in-jokes". Atari ST had a mixed review with praising the game humor while being critical of the character's hesitant nature in dangerous situations.

German retro game archives had mixed reviews with Kultpower being critical of the "run, dodge and collect" style of the game and also it to be not unpredictable that makes the user question utility of the items, and Aktueller Software Markt (ASM) was positive and defined Terramex as the arcade adventure of the year (1988) for Atari ST.

The Commodore 64 version of Terramex appeared at number 4 in Swansea's Microstore top ten chart published in February 1988, behind the Spectrum versions of Championship Sprint, Roadwars and Nigel Mansell's Grand Prix.

== See also ==
- Moley Christmas – 1987 video game
- Gremlin Interactive – British video game developer
