= A Prehistoric Tale =

1990 video game

- Developer: The Lost Boys
- Publisher: Thalion
- Designer: Richard Karsmakers
- Composer: Jochen Hippel
- Platforms: Amiga, Atari ST
- Release: 1990
- Genres: Platform, puzzle
- Modes: Single-player, multiplayer

A Prehistoric Tale is a platform video game developed by The Lost Boys and published by Thalion Software. It was released for the Amiga and Atari ST in 1990.

== Gameplay ==
The game has both puzzle and platformer elements to it. It has 80 levels and can either be played single player or simultaneous two-player.

== Development ==
The developers described the game as being inspired by the Commodore 64 game Dino Eggs. The game is particularly notable for its title music, an original and much lauded composition by Jochen Hippel. The game developer team was called "The Lost Boys", a collection of Atari ST programmers and artists. TLB included (among others) the brothers Tim and David Moss, who arrived on 24 July 1990, who worked on the game across a very hot 1990 summer. Tim would go on to join Sony and be the lead programmer for PlayStation 2 titles God of War and God of War II.

== Reception ==
Amiga Action felt that despite the recent technological advancements in platform games, that this title was step back, describing it as adequate, simple, and unoriginal. Amiga Format offered a mixed review, though gave specific praise to the game's music and soundtrack. Amiga Joker gave the title a rating of 77%. The title was also reviewed by ASM, PowerPlay, Amiga Magazin, AMIGA Kickstart/ ST-Computer, and ST News.
