= Tower FRA =

1990 video game

- Developer(s): Atlantis Productions
- Publisher(s): Thalion Software
- Platform(s): Amiga
- Release: EU: 1990
- Genre(s): Simulation
- Mode(s): Single-player

Tower FRA is a 1990 simulation video game developed by Atlantis Productions and published by Thalion Software for the Amiga. Ports for the Atari ST and MS-DOS were cancelled.

== Gameplay ==
The player takes the role of an air traffic controller at either Hamburg or Frankfurt. The job is to manage things like arrivals, departures, overflights, taxiing, and take care of situations which may include engine fires or hijackings. The game is controlled through four types of radar displays: main radar, tower central, arrival, and departure.

== Reception ==
Reception

Review scores
Publication	Score
Aktueller Software Markt	7/12
Amiga Action	80%
Amiga Format	74%
Amiga Power	2/6
The One	85%

Aktueller Software Markt criticized the speech synthesis but recommended the game to the fans of the genre. The One compared the game positively to Wesson International's RAPCON (1990) but also criticized the voices and concluded: "The lack of aesthetic pleasure however is more than made up for by the challenge and intensity that's generated." Amiga Format called the game "a strong low-level control sim; that is complex enough to challenge but friendly enough to use." Amiga Action summarized: "This game is not going to appeal to everyone, but for those of you who enjoy this type of thing Tower Fra is brilliant." Amiga Power called the game "fairly boring".
