= Magic Lines =

1990 video game

- Developer(s): Tale Software
- Publisher(s): Thalion Software
- Platform(s): Amiga, Atari ST
- Release: EU: 1990
- Genre(s): Puzzle
- Mode(s): Single-player

Magic Lines is a 1990 puzzle video game developed by Tale Software and published by Thalion Software for the Amiga and Atari ST.

== Gameplay ==
Magic Lines is a sliding puzzle game where the player must place water pipes within a time limit on a 5x5 grid to create a path for a red spark to travel.

== Reception ==
Reception

Review scores
Publication	Score
Aktueller Software Markt	8/12 (Amiga)
Joystick	75% (ST)
ST Format	47%
Amiga-Magazin	5.7/12
Power Play	59% (Amiga, ST)

Aktueller Software Markt compared the game to Super Pipeline and Block Hole, and called the game unoriginal but well staged and fun. Power Play said the same concept is done better in the Game Boy game, Blodia. Amiga-Magazin compared the game to Pipe Mania and thought the game was too difficult. Joystick also compared it to Pipe Mania and said the game will appeal to fans of puzzle games. ST Format liked the graphics and sound but said the gameplay is frustrating.
