= Warp (1989 video game) =

1989 video game

- Developer(s): Thalion Software
- Publisher(s): GER: Thalion Software; EU: Grandslam Entertainments
- Platform(s): Atari ST, Amiga
- Release: EU: 1989
- Genre(s): Shoot 'em up
- Mode(s): Single-player

Warp is a 1989 multidirectional shooter developed and published by Thalion Software for the Atari ST. It was ported later to the Amiga.

== Gameplay ==
The player is a criminal who has stolen a spaceship and encounters an evil alien race called Myrons that are about to destroy Earth. The objective is to destroy all alien power stations before they energise and blow up Earth. The game features 16-directional scrolling and 10 levels linked by warp tunnels. The spaceship has two weapons: a light laser used for weaker enemies and a more powerful blaster weapon used for armoured enemies. The game has an energy system where the ship's limited amount of energy can be focused on either weapons, fuel, or shields.

== Reception ==
Reception

Review scores
Publication	Score
Aktueller Software Markt	9/12 (ST); 8/12 (Amiga)
Amiga Action	55%
ST Action	54%
ST Format	20%

Aktueller Software Markt gave a positive review, praising the graphics, sound, and gameplay. Amiga Action said: "The graphics and sound are nothing to amaze you, and the game becomes very boring after just a few hour's [sic] play." ST Action noted: "the gameplay relies more on luck than skill, making for a very repetitive and irksome game." ST Format summarized: "Warp plays like someone discovered a really neat way of getting the ST to perform smooth scrolling, and in their haste to show it off to effects-hungry ST gameplayers, forgot to bolt on the game."
