= No Second Prize (video game) =

1992 video game

- Developer: Thalion Software
- Publisher: Thalion Software
- Platforms: Amiga, Atari ST
- Release: EU: 1992
- Genre: Racing simulator
- Mode: Single-player

No Second Prize is a 1992 racing video game developed and published by Thalion Software for the Amiga and Atari ST.

== Gameplay ==
No Second Prize is a game about simulating motorcycle racing. The bike is controlled entirely by mouse, there are no joystick controls. The game features six playable riders, each with different strengths and weaknesses. 20 tracks are included set around Europe. A season in the game consists of driving six laps on each track. On every race, the player is competing against five other riders. Three points are awarded to the winner, two for second place, and one for third place. The game can be saved eight times during the season. Manual or automatic transmission can be selected. Manual transmission allows to rev the engine higher. A replay mode is included that features four camera angles and rewind, pause, and fast-forward buttons.

== Reception ==
Reception

Review scores
Publication	Score
Aktueller Software Markt	11/12 (Amiga)
ST Format	87%
CU Amiga	90%
The One	91% (Amiga)
Play Time	86% (Amiga)
Power Play	72% (Amiga)

No Second Prize received generally positive reviews from critics. Aktueller Software Markt said the game is unparalleled in its class and noted Psygnosis' Red Zone to be very poor in comparison. ST Format said: "If you're prepared to put in the work learning how to control the bike and you can handle the frustrations of race-losing smashups, you're in for an exhilarating ride." The One concluded: "The more I play it, the more difficult it is for me to find any real faults with No Second Prize - it is, quite simply, a brilliant racing game, and one which can holds its head up high alongside classics like Lotus, Formula One Grand Prix and Indianapolis 500." CU Amiga noted that "This is to motorbikes what Microprose's Formula One Grand Prix is to motor racing." and summarized the game "Without a doubt the best motorbike sim on the Amiga."
