= Trex Warrior =

1991 video game

- Developer(s): Thalion Software
- Publisher(s): Thalion Software
- Designer(s): Michael Bittner; Erik Simon
- Composer(s): Skinnybone
- Platform(s): Amiga, Atari ST
- Release: EU: 1991; UK: 1993
- Genre(s): Action, sports
- Mode(s): Single-player

Trex Warrior: 22nd Century Gladiator is a 1991 action video game developed and published by Thalion Software for the Amiga and Atari ST. Previously unreleased in the United Kingdom, the game was released in 1993 on The One magazine cover disk as public-domain software.

== Gameplay ==
In the 22nd century, a new sport has emerged that involves battling droids in a walled arena. The player is a contestant named Riano Bolar, who must fight off various types of droids, including speeders and missile-launching "Wasps". Different kind pads can be driven over: jump pads, shield pads which replenish the droid's shields, star pads which cause damage to the droid. Static objects can be blown up to take out nearby opponent droids. At the end of each survived day, credits are earned that can be spent on new weaponry.

== Reception ==
Reception

Review scores
Publication	Score
Aktueller Software Markt	9/12 (Amiga)
Tilt	16/20 (Amiga); 17/20 (ST)
Amiga Joker	78% (Amiga)
Power Play	74% (Amiga)

Aktueller Software Markt gave a positive review and praised the fast graphics, music, and the opening credits sequence. They criticized that the game only offered mouse controls. Amiga Joker compared the game positively to Paul Woakes' Encounter (1983) and Backlash (1987). Power Play described the game as captivating and exciting. Tilt praised the strategic gameplay of the Amiga version and called it a very good game that will appeal to all action fans. Reviewing the Atari ST version Tilt said "the 3D is excellent, the graphics are beautiful and the ergonomics are beyond reproach". They criticized that saved games are limited to 10 slots and can't be deleted. Overall Trex Warrior was called "truly a great game".
