= Dragonflight (video game) =

1990 video game

- Developer(s): Thalion Software
- Publisher(s): Thalion Software
- Designer(s): Erik Simon
- Programmer(s): Udo Fischer
- Artist(s): Erik Simon
- Composer(s): Jochen Hippel
- Platform(s): Amiga, Atari ST, MS-DOS
- Release: 1990
- Genre(s): Role-playing
- Mode(s): Single-player

Dragonflight is a 1990 role-playing video game developed and published by Thalion Software for the Amiga, Atari ST, and MS-DOS. The game started development in January 1987 by two German programmers Udo Fischer and Erik Simon.

== Plot ==
The game came with a 104-page novella that told the backstory of the game. Once abundant, the disappearance of magic and dragons has led to the world needing both to save humans, dwarves and elves from evil powers. The party consists of four characters: a human fighter, a human wizard, a dwarf fighter, and an elf all-rounder. Their quest is to find the dragons and a number of magical items.

== Gameplay ==
The overworld is depicted from Ultima-style overhead view. The dungeons are in first-person perspective. When the turn-based combat starts the perspective changes to a sideview. Combat is played on a grid map and an overhead view of the battlefield is also displayed on screen. The game is entirely controlled with a mouse.

== Reception ==
Reception

Review scores
| Publication | Score |
|---|---|
| Aktueller Software Markt | 50-51/60 (ST) |
| Amiga Action | 68% |
| ST Format | 71% |
| The Australian Commodore and Amiga Review | 85% |
| Play Time | 12% (DOS) |

ST Format thought the plot was outdated and documentation awful but liked the non-linear aspect of the gameplay. One Amiga Action reviewer said the gameplay is bland and unimaginative, another reviewer noted the combat as stiff and annoying. The difficulty was said to be too easy for RPG veterans. The Australian Commodore and Amiga Review said the game is technically excellent and compared the game favorably to Legend of Faerghail, saying that Dragonflight has more depth and stronger storyline. Aktueller Software Markt said Dragonflight is competitive with the Ultima series. Play Time had trouble getting the DOS version to run on a VGA card and when it worked the graphics were poor and the sound annoying.

By 1992, Dragonflight had sold 25,000 copies on all platforms, making it the best-selling game by Thalion Software at that time.
