= Albion (video game) =

1995 role-playing video game

- Developer: Blue Byte
- Publisher: Blue Byte
- Producer: Thomas Hertzler
- Programmer: Jurie Horneman
- Artist: Thorsten Mutschall
- Composer: Matthias Steinwachs
- Platform: MS-DOS
- Release: DE: 1995; NA: August 30, 1996
- Genre: Role-playing game
- Mode: Single-player

Albion is a role-playing video game, developed and published by Blue Byte for MS-DOS. Originally released in German in 1995, the game was later translated to English for international release the following year. The game, which mostly involves traditional fantasy elements, such as magic, combined with a science fiction setting, sees players assume the role of a space pilot aboard a mining colony ship, who becomes stranded on a world set to be mined for its resources, despite it teeming with life and sentient races.

The game is considered a spiritual successor to the Amiga role-playing video games Amberstar and Ambermoon, bearing very similar gameplay and being developed by the same core team under the Thalion Software name. Although intended for launch on the Amiga computer, the bankruptcy of Commodore shifted the developers to focusing on it being launched for PC.

Albion received positive reviews following its launch, earning praise for its originality in combat, story and puzzles. The game was re-released in 2015 on Gog.com with support for Microsoft Windows.

== Gameplay ==
Albion is a role-playing video game and features a number of gameplay elements typical of that genre. The player controls a party of up to six characters, each with their own skills and abilities. With these characters they may explore the game world, fight enemies, and engage in conversation or trade. Characters earn experience points by defeating enemies or by solving certain puzzles. When a character has sufficient experience points, they will advance in level, increasing their maximum life and spell points. They will also receive training points which can be expended at a trainer to permanently increase one or more of their skills.

Albion uses a hybrid 2D/3D graphical system to depict its environments. Most interior locations are shown using a 2D overhead view, centered on the player's party. Movement is possible using either the keyboard or the mouse and the mouse is used to examine or manipulate objects within the reach of the party leader. A similar view is used when exploring the larger world outside the cities, but with objects and characters shown on a much smaller scale. Upon entering most dungeons, caves, and the exteriors of larger cities, the game switches to a real-time first-person 3D view. As in the 2D view, players may use the mouse or keyboard to move around and the mouse is used to select objects to interact with. A 2D automap is available to assist navigation in these areas.

Combat occurs when the party runs into one or more enemies. The combat system is turn-based and takes place on a five-by-six grid similar to a chess board, with the player's characters arranged at the bottom and their enemies at the top. At the start of each turn, the player selects an action for each character to perform: Attack, Move, Use Magic, Use Item, or Flee. The order in which party members and enemies execute their actions depends on their relative speeds and is an important tactical consideration. Since attacks are targeted at a grid square rather than the character or enemy in it, attacks will miss if their intended target moves before they are made, even if that target is still within reach. The movement of the player's characters is limited to the bottom two rows, but there is also an "Advance Party" option which moves all enemies one row towards the party.

== Plot ==
=== Setting ===
Albion takes place in the distant future during the 23rd century, where human technology on Earth has developed to the point that spaceships can venture out to distant star system with hyperspace drives, funded by corporations rather than local governments. As a result, the corporations focus highly on exploring space to find resources to support the money spent building the ships for such purposes, manning then with specialised AI systems that can utilize artificial bodies to interact with crew members. The game's main story focuses on the titular planet of Albion, which happens to be inhabited by two distinctive races: the Iskai, a feline-like humanoid race which use plants for furniture, sewerage systems and even homes, and have developed the means of prolonged lives through magical rituals to transfer a spirit from one body to another; and the Celts, descendants of those from Earth who transported to Albion over two thousand years ago, arriving on the planet and forming their own kingdoms and societies.

=== Story ===
In the year 2227, the multinational DDT corporation sends the gigantic colony ship, the Toronto, to a distant planetary system to search for raw materials. After the ship exits hyperspace, pilot Tom Driscoll wakes up from a vivid dream - one of many he has experienced since the trip began - to learn that the Toronto's communication system overloaded and blew up, killing a government inspector assigned to the ship. As a result, he is assigned Rainer Hofstedt, a junior government agent, to investigate a desert planet that the ship's AI, Ned, has found to contain vast ore deposits. When the pair leave to conduct a planetary survey, they discover the data readings do not match those of Ned's, moments before the shuttle malfunctions and crashlands on the surface.

Two months after the crash, the pair, learning that the planet holds life, find themselves amongst the iskai, a sentient species living on the planet, which they call Albion. Receiving their help, the pair are joined by the warrior Drirr and the mage Sira, as they proceed to find someone who could have seen the Toronto arrive on the planet. Their search leads them to encountering humans, descendants of the Celts, acquiring the help of the mute druid Mellthas; he and Sira develop a bond after experiencing a spiritual moment of communication between them. After preventing a conflict between the iskai and the humans, the group are brought to a meeting with a secret society called The Enlightened Ones, who offer to help Tom find the Toronto; Rainer, interested by this group, leaves to study with them, leaving Tom to take assistance from an Enlightened called Harriet.

Learning the ship landed in a desert near to a city of humans, Tom makes his way to its location with his friends to hopefully stop them mining the planet. Upon encountering an unmanned shuttle that lands upon finding him, Tom is abducted by the craft and knocked out. When he comes to aboard the Toronto, he finds the captain, Brandt, has declared him mentally unwell; no one aboard the craft are aware the planet is teeming with life. Detained in the medical wing of the newly formed colony, Tom is freed by his friend Joe, a technician, who reveals he has become suspicious of Brandt's and Ned's recent actions, along with the explosion in the communication room. Agreeing to help him, Joe joins Tom in trying to sabotage the AI's systems, but both are forced to flee from the Toronto when they learn Ned intends to go ahead with the mining operation, having suppressed all data on the planet's true condition.

Reuniting with his friends, Tom discusses the situation with the Enlightened Ones. Fearful the Toronto will kill the entity that resides in the planet, they propose a plan of creating a weapon called "The Seed", which Rainer reveals will need to be put into the colony's fusion reactor to shut it down. Seeking knowledge required to forge the weapon, Tom eventually leads an assault on the Toronto, dealing with Ned's security measures and informing the colonists about the truth concerning Albion; they eventually abandon the colony. Confronting the AI, the group manage to use the weapon, destroying Ned and transforming the colony into a giant utopia of plant life. Tom, relieved the situation is resolved, decides the group's next job is to inform the human colonists that they must now make a new life on Albion.

== Reception ==
Reception

Review scores
Publication	Score
Computer Gaming World	3.5/5
Next Generation	4/5
PC Gamer (US)	88%
Computer Games Magazine	4/5
PC Games	B−

Writing for PC Gamer US, Michael Wolf called Albion "a fun, engrossing, and involved roleplaying experience", with "all the elements of a great roleplaying adventure." In Computer Gaming World, Petra Schlunk wrote, "I found this lengthy game enjoyable to play and recommend it to lovers of role-playing games when another dry spell hits." The game was a finalist for Computer Gaming World's 1996 "Role-Playing Game of the Year" award, which ultimately went to The Elder Scrolls II: Daggerfall. The reviewer for Next Generation called Albion "well-thought out and definitely worth checking out", and praised it as a "bright spot in the desert" of computer role-playing games at the time.

Andy Butcher reviewed Albion for Arcane magazine, rating it a 7 out of 10 overall, and stated that "Graphically it's an impressive game, with some well-drawn maps and interesting characters, all of which is complemented by fairly good sound effects. It's also very large, with a wide range of areas to explore, people to deal with and tasks to complete. Albion isn't going to change your views of computer 'roleplaying' games, but if you are able to put up with the restrictions of the genre, this is a fine example of the form."

Chuck Klimushyn of Computer Games Strategy Plus considered Albion to be "a breath of fresh air for the RPG crowd", and he wrote that "those who cut their teeth on the likes of Might and Magic, Wizardry, and Ultima may find that the future looks a little brighter because of this latest offering from Blue Byte." The magazine later nominated Albion as its 1996 role-playing game of the year.

Albion was a runner-up for Computer Game Entertainment's 1996 "Best Role-Playing Game" prize. The magazine's editors wrote, "Albion was refreshing, not only because it helped fill a void, but because it carefully balanced story, puzzles, combat and exploration." It was also nominated in this category by CNET Gamecenter, whose editors gave the prize to Meridian 59.

== Legacy ==
In 2011 a port for ARM architecture and the Pandora handheld was created by fans via static recompilation from the original x86 binary executable. The community still updates this recompiled version and released also a Windows and Linux build in 2015.

On July 29, 2015, Albion was re-released on the digital distributor GOG.com, albeit only the original version and DOSBox, not the newer port.
