= Nick Faldo's Championship Golf =

1992 video game

- Amiga box cover
- Developers: Arcon International; Arc Developments (C64); Images Software (CD32)
- Publisher: Grandslam Entertainment
- Producer: Paul Chamberlain
- Designer: Neil Paterson (C64)
- Programmers: Neil Paterson (C64); Andrew Perkins (Amiga); Tony Mack (CD32); Richard Underhill (MS-DOS)
- Artists: Gary Tonge (Amiga, C64, MS-DOS)
- Composer: Andi McGinty (Amiga)
- Platforms: Amiga, CD32, Commodore 64, MS-DOS
- Release: 1992: C64; 1993: Amiga; 1993: MS-DOS; 1994: CD32
- Genre: Sports

Nick Faldo's Championship Golf is a golf video game published by Grandslam Entertainment for the Commodore 64 in 1992. Versions for Amiga, Amiga CD32, and MS-DOS followed. Ports for the Sega Genesis and Master System were in development, but never released. It centers around British golf champion Nick Faldo.

== Reception ==
Reception

Review scores
Publication	Score
Amiga Action	88%
Amiga Computing	87%
Amiga Format	90%
Amiga Format	90%
Amiga Joker	77%
Amiga Magazine	8/10
Amiga Power	88%
Power Unlimited	63/100

== Legacy ==
On December 15, 2025, a very early prototype of the cancelled Sega Genesis conversion was released by the Video Game History Foundation, along with many Sega Channel materials.
