= Ambermoon =

1993 video game

- German cover art
- Developer: Thalion Software
- Publisher: Thalion Software
- Producer: Erik Simon
- Designers: Karsten Köper; Erik Simon
- Programmers: Jurie Horneman; Michael Bittner
- Artists: Monika Krawinkel; Erik Simon; Thorsten Mutschall
- Writer: Karsten Köper
- Composer: Matthias Steinwachs
- Platform: Amiga
- Release: 1993
- Genre: Role-playing
- Mode: Single player

Ambermoon is a role-playing game developed and published by Thalion Software, released in 1993 for the Amiga. It was the second part of an unfinished trilogy (Amberstar, released in 1992, being the first).

== Plot ==
In Ambermoon, the player plays as the grandson of the hero of Amberstar. The grandfather of the player explains at the beginning of the game that his presumed-dead companion spoke to him in a dream of a new threat to the land of Lyramion. He consequently sends the player on a journey to Newlake, where he can speak with his old companion.

Those familiar with Thalion's games could find many connections to other games. The main character from Lionheart makes an appearance, as does the main enemy from Amberstar. By way of a dimensional gate, the player briefly enters the world from Thalion's previous game Dragonflight.

== Gameplay ==
The graphics are a mesh of 2D (the outdoor world and many buildings) and 3D (dungeons, special buildings, and cities). Battles are turn-based and are animated in front of a static background. Due to the game's high-quality graphics, large number of enemies and cities, and the considerable size of the game world, extra disks are necessary. Since hard drives for the Amiga were rare, most players had to put up with frequent disk changes (and corresponding long load times), particularly before battle scenes.

During this adventure, the player journeys through not only the islands of Lyramion, but the moons of the game world as well. The game world is very large, and the player interacts with many non-player characters, some of whom become his companions. The player's perspective differs depending upon which character is 'active', for example, playing as a dwarf shows a lower first-person perspective due to their short height.

== Development ==
Ambermoon began development in April 1992, and was released around Easter 1993. Ambermoon was only ever released in German for the Amiga. Although planned and developed the English version was never published. The last beta (v1.07) of the English version was released in 1998 through the Thalion Webshrine. According to The One, Ambermoon lacks sound effects due to "[concentrating] more on implementing atmospheric tunes". Ambermoon's soundtrack was composed by Berlin music student Matthias Steinwachs. The world maps are four times larger than those in its predecessor, Amberstar, with each world having a total surface area of 800x800 squares.

British gaming magazine The One interviewed Erik Simon, Ambermoon's producer, for information regarding the English version's development in a pre-release interview. Ambermoon features first person 3D movement in dungeons, and Simon states that "we have had a bitmap-polygon routine at Thalion for over two years now ... we've not had the opportunity to implement this technique but now the chance has finally arisen. Our revolutionary realtime texture mapping system gives you the possibility to move around freely in three-dimensional dungeons and cities." Simon goes on to express that this feature is "normally impossible" to do on 16-bit machines, and states that "The development has gone from wireframe to solid polygons and now on to texture mapping. Texture mapping uses the same simple calculations that most polygon games use but instead of taking a simple one-colour polygon, we take a bitmap graphic and distort it spatially so that it fits on the polygon." Simon explains that "Many painting programs such as DPaint have been doing this sort of thing for years but the real problem lies with performing it in realtime with dozens of bitplane polygons. This is quite a task because you have to handle every single pixel of the object, instead of using a fast one-colour polygon routine. It's easier to do on the PC than the Amiga, due to the VGA cards [the byte-per-pixel mode], not to speak of the faster CPUs."

Dungeons in Ambermoon are drawn using four bit-planes, giving sixteen colours, but the game itself runs in five planes in 32 colours. Due to this, the game loses "25% of the optimum speed", but The One states that "[Thalion feels] that the advantages of having more colours to play with and the ability to smoothly fade objects to black when there is little light in the dungeon more than make up for this." Simon states that "the average speed of the dungeon section is anything between ten to five frames a second, depending on what's on screen ... There are special routines for turboboards which speed things up on upgraded machines. We're constantly working on optimization, but I don't think we can make it much faster." An optional feature for textured ceilings and floors for Amiga A1200s or better was considered during development. Small fireballs were used for testing having many objects on-screen simultaneously, and larger fires were used to test how Ambermoon handles large objects.

In regards to limitations during Ambermoon's development, Simon stated that "We always have many more ideas than we can program or paint but are unable to for one reason or another. It's not a question of the machine's limitations, it's a question of time [and money] ... Ambermoon is a project with which we are testing to see whether the Amiga's share is still strong enough to afford the development of high-standard software." Simon states that one of the main points of the philosophy of Ambermoon's design is "to use both a complete 2D and 3D system. In our opinion [it's] a very good way to create a whole fantasy world, instead of having just a complex dungeon system like many other RPGs. It combines the thrill of exploring a huge world in 2D without losing orientation ... Interior furniture and architecture that would be too complicated to be realistically displayed in 3D can be portrayed in 2D instead. We're trying to offer the player two RPG games in one which would be able to stand alone as a game each." Simon goes on to state that he feels that the team at Thalion are "the only software house capable of doing this because we have the experience of Amberstar and some new development tools. I think Ambermoon will be the most advanced RPG available on the 16-bit machines. I really hate arrogant comments like that, but take a look at the finished game and you'll see."

Legends of Valour was anticipated to compete with Ambermoon, and Simon stated in regards to Legends that "it failed to impress us here at Thalion ... our screen window is approximately three times bigger and still faster. We're using the same size screen for the texture mapped dungeon in Amberstar which is why our system doesn't tend to 'crumble' distant objects as much as Legends of Valour. Furthermore, we seem to use bigger bitmap blocks so the pixels don't zoom into larger squares as fast." Simon refers to Legends of Valour as "pioneering work on the Amiga". "With our system, for example, it's impossible to have a 'second' storeys [sic] like in Legends, at least at the moment."

== Legacy ==
Ambermoon was a major success for Thalion, but it ultimately failed to prevent the company's collapse, which occurred before they were able to begin the final part of the planned trilogy. Part of the Thalion team went on to Blue Byte, which produced the graphically-similar game Albion, a spiritual sequel to Ambermoon.

In 2022, a fan expansion, Ambermoon Advanced, was announced. The first two of five planned episodes were released in January 2023. On May 14, 2023, the surviving source code for the game and its predecessor Amberstar was uploaded on GitHub by Jurie Horneman, programmer of both games.
