= The Seven Gates of Jambala =

1989 video game

- Developer(s): Thalion Software
- Publisher(s): Grandslam Entertainments
- Platform(s): Amiga, Atari ST, Amiga CD32
- Release: 1989 (Amiga, ST); 1994 (CD32)
- Genre(s): Platform
- Mode(s): Single-player

The Seven Gates of Jambala is a 1989 platform video game developed by Thalion Software and published by Grandslam Entertainments for the Amiga and Atari ST. An Amiga CD32 port was released in 1994. 8-bit ports for the Commodore 64, Amstrad CPC, and ZX Spectrum were cancelled.

== Gameplay ==
Dravion is a student of an old wizard. During a casting of a spell, Dravion is accidentally sent to the realm of Jambala. In order to escape the magical world, he must find the Great Wand that is made up of seven pieces. Each piece is found in one of the seven cities that takes the shape of a horizontally scrolling level. At the beginning Dravion can only throw pixie dust but later learns bigger and better spells. Gold that is found throughout the levels can be used to buy items and information from merchants. Level entrances (the titular gates) are guarded by boss monsters.

== Reception ==
Reception

Review scores
| Publication | Score |
|---|---|
| ACE | 604/1000 (ST) |
| Aktueller Software Markt | 9/12 (Amiga, ST); 6/12 (CD32) |
| Amiga Format | 79% |
| Computer and Video Games | 71% (ST) |
| ST Action | 66% |
| The Games Machine (UK) | 71% (Amiga, ST) |

Computer and Video Games summarized: "[...] this is a playable, addictive game which, although looking only average, has loads of super music and goodies of all-important addictive qualities." Amiga Format called it "a slick and well polished game with small but well-defined sprites, haunting soundtracks and impressive presentation screens." The Games Machine said that "[a]lthough the visuals and aurals of The Seven Gates of Jambala are good, gameplay is less than compelling." ST Action concluded: "Seven Gates of Jambala is a standard platform romp that's been polished near to perfection." ACE liked the graphics and sound but found the gameplay lacking. Aktueller Software Markt reviewed the CD32 version and thought the controls felt bad.
