= Atomino =

1990 video game

- Amiga cover art
- Developer: Blue Byte
- Publisher: Psygnosis
- Composer: Jochen Hippel
- Platforms: Amiga, Atari ST, Commodore 64, MS-DOS
- Release: 1990
- Genre: Puzzle
- Mode: Single player

Atomino is a 1990 puzzle video game originally for the Amiga, Atari ST and MS-DOS. A version was made for the Commodore 64 in 1991. The objective is to build molecules from atoms, with gradually increasing difficulty and speed.

== Gameplay ==
The player is given a grid on which to place atoms, which are supplied at random into a stack. An atom needs a specific number of "bonds", from 1 to 4, which are made by placing atoms next to each other. When all connected atoms have exactly the correct number of bonds, a molecule is completed, and it is removed from the board.

Atoms can be placed on a space, or swapped with an existing atom, which will enter the stack. For instance, even if you place an atom needing 4 bonds on the edge, where it has only 3 neighbors, it can be overwritten with an atom needing fewer bonds.

At each level, an objective is given, like "Build 2 molecules" or "Build 4 molecules with at least 9 atoms". In addition to completing the objective, the player must remove all atoms from the board before the next level starts. Over time, more atoms are added to the stack. If the player cannot complete the objective before the stack is filled to the top, the game is over.

== Reception ==
Reception

Review scores
Publication	Score	
Publication	Atari ST	C64
Zzap!64		93%
Atari ST User	76%	
