= No Second Prize =

No Second Prize may refer to:

- "No Second Prize" (song), a 1984 single by Jimmy Barnes
- No Second Prize (video game), a 1992 racing game by Thalion Software
