= Enchanted Land =

1990 video game

- Developer(s): Thalion Software
- Publisher(s): Thalion Software
- Platform(s): Atari ST, Amiga
- Release: EU: 1990
- Genre(s): Platform
- Mode(s): Single-player

Enchanted Land is a 1990 platform video game developed and published by Thalion Software for the Atari ST. An Amiga port was released later.

== Gameplay ==
The game takes place in the fairytale land of Damiran. The source of magic, Heart of Lore, has broken into 100 pieces. The player is an old wizard, Krugan, who has been tasked to retrieve the pieces that are strewn across the land. The game is a scrolling platform game consisting of six levels. The game features nine different weapons that can be powered-up by potions that are found throughout the levels. Enchanted Land was the first game to use 4-plane multidirectional scrolling in full screen on the Atari ST.

== Reception ==
Reception

Review scores
Publication	Score
Aktueller Software Markt	8/12 (ST); 9/12 (Amiga)
Joystick	84% (ST)
ST Format	92%
Tilt	14/20 (ST); 15/20 (Amiga)
ST Magazine	17/20

Aktueller Software Markt reviewed the Atari ST version and criticized the overloaded graphics but praised the cutting-edge scrolling effect. It was recommended to try the game before buying. ST Format called the game "extremely addictive" and "an enjoyable, absorbing platform game". ST Magazine called Enchanted Land "a very well made and enjoyable arcade game". Joystick said the game is not revolutionary but very well made technically.

According to Thalion's co-founder Erik Simon, the game was in development too long and sold less than expected.
