= ST/Amiga Format =

British computer magazine

ST Amiga Format
- Issue #1, June 1988
- Editor: Ben Taylor & Simon Williams; Ben Taylor; Richard Monteiro
- Categories: Computer magazine
- Frequency: Monthly
- First issue: June 1988
- Final issue Number: July 1989; Issue 13
- Company: Future plc
- Country: United Kingdom
- Based in: Bath
- Language: English
- ISSN: 0954-805X

ST Amiga Format was a computer magazine that covered the Atari ST and Amiga computers. It was published by Future plc to cover the ever growing market for the, then-new, 16-bit home computers. Issues were equally balanced with coverage for both Amiga and Atari ST systems. Issue 1 included a main feature 'ST or Amiga? The Choice is Yours', where the pros and cons for each machine was examined.

ST Amiga Format often included a floppy disk mounted on the cover, which used a unique dual format filesystem that could be read by both the Amiga and ST. The disks included game demos, software utilities, etc.

Regular features included tutorials (on both Amiga and ST), Gamebuster, Gold Dust (a rumours section), Desktop (tips and technical guide for the ST), Workbench (tips and technical guide for the Amiga), Escape Sequence (last page) and the usual news and letters pages.

Issue 13 (July 1989) was the last issue under the dual format. The sale of sister magazine ACE freed up the staff necessary to split the magazine into two separate titles. ST Format and Amiga Format were launched.
