= Dual format =

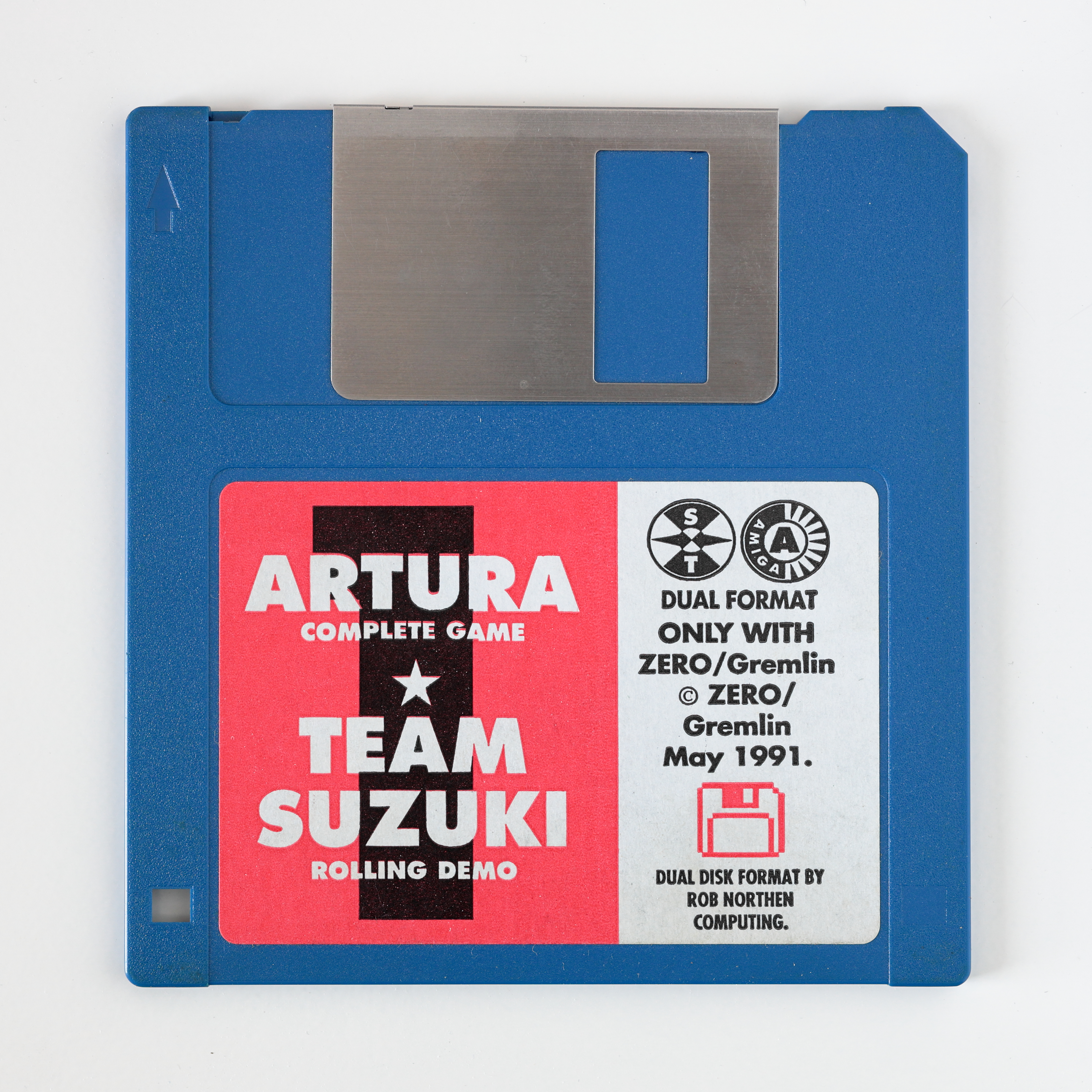
A dual-format games demo diskette for the Atari ST and Amiga.

Dual format is a method of software distribution in which software intended for two or more computing platforms is distributed on the same physical storage medium. The term was originally associated with floppy disks formatted so that otherwise incompatible computers could access software intended for each system. Comparable multi-platform distribution techniques have also been used with other storage media, including Nintendo's Dual Mode Game Paks for the Game Boy and Game Boy Color.

== Implementations ==
=== Floppy disks ===
In the late 1980s, the term was used to refer to disks that could be used to boot either an Amiga or Atari ST computer. The layout of the first track of the disk was specially arranged to contain information usable by both systems, allowing each operating system to interpret the disk in the format it expected. The technique was used for some commercially available games and for disks covermounted on ST/Amiga Format magazine. Other games were distributed on Amiga and IBM PC dual-format disks, while "tri-format" disks could contain Amiga, Atari ST and PC versions of the same software.

Most dual- and tri-format disks were implemented using technology developed by Rob Northen Computing.

The term was later also used for disks containing both Windows and Macintosh software.

Examples of commercially released dual- and tri-format floppy disks include:

- Action Fighter (Amiga/PC)
- Lethal Xcess – Wings of Death II (Amiga/Atari ST)
- Monster Business (Amiga/Atari ST)
- Populous: The Promised Lands (Amiga/Atari ST)
- Rick Dangerous (Amiga/PC)
- Rick Dangerous 2 (Amiga/PC)
- Stone Age (Amiga/Atari ST)
- Street Fighter (Amiga/PC)
- Starglider 2 (Amiga/Atari ST)
- 3D Pool (Amiga/Atari ST/PC)
- Stunt Car Racer (Amiga/PC)
- Bionic Commando (Amiga/PC)
- Carrier Command (Amiga/PC)
- Blasteroids (Amiga/PC)
- E-Motion (Amiga/PC)
- Indiana Jones and the Last Crusade: The Action Game (Amiga/PC)
- Out Run (Amiga/PC)
- World Class Leader Board (Amiga/PC)
- International Soccer Challenge (Amiga/PC)
- MicroProse Soccer (Amiga/PC)

=== Game Boy Game Paks ===
For use on the Game Boy and Game Boy Color, Nintendo used Dual Mode Game Boy Game Paks for cartridges designed to operate on both generations of hardware. Nintendo distinguished these from original Game Boy Game Paks and Game Boy Color-only Game Paks.

Nintendo's Game Boy Programming Manual describes cartridges of this type as "DMG/CGB Compatible", distinguishing them from those restricted to the Game Boy Color. In the cartridge header, the CGB support code 80h identifies the presence of software for both the original Game Boy (DMG) and Game Boy Color (CGB), while C0h identifies software intended exclusively for the Game Boy Color.

The programming manual also documents hardware-dependent branching. When the cartridge is loaded from, the program can determine whether it is running on Game Boy Color hardware or an original Game Boy and perform different processing accordingly. Nintendo describes this as "Branched Processing for CGB and DMG/MGB/MGL", providing separate processing paths for the Game Boy Color and monochrome Game Boy hardware.

The differences between the Game Boy and Game Boy Color versions of the software were more obvious in some games. Some dual mode cartridges contained substantially different software between the two platforms. The instruction manual for Rare's Conker's Pocket Tales explicitly states that there are "two versions of this game", one that plays on the original Game Boy and another that plays on the Game Boy Color. The manual subsequently distinguishes between the "Original Game Boy/Game Boy Pocket version" and the "Color version" when describing their controls and functionality.

Digital Eclipse editorial director Chris Kohler has similarly described games of this type. While discussing the Dual Mode games included in Toy Story: Retro Roundup!, Kohler explained that such cartridges were not simply the same game with different colors, but contained a Game Boy version and a Game Boy Color version and select which version to boot according to the hardware. He also noted that Digital Eclipse studio head Mike Mika had worked on several games using this arrangement.

Dual Mode Game Paks therefore differ technically from the earlier dual format floppy disk technique. An Amiga/Atari ST dual format disk was structured so that systems using otherwise incompatible disk formats could interpret the same physical disk. Game Boy dual mode instead used the common Game Pak medium and the related architectures of the Game Boy systems, with compatible software able to identify the hardware on which it was executing and select or branch to the appropriate version.

Examples of commercially released Dual Mode Game Boy/Game Boy Color Game Paks include:

- 720°
- Centipede
- Chessmaster
- Conker's Pocket Tales
- Dragon Warrior I & II
- Dragon Warrior Monsters
- Frogger
- Game & Watch Gallery 2
- Game & Watch Gallery 3
- Grand Theft Auto
- Harvest Moon GBC
- Harvest Moon 2 GBC
- Monopoly
- Monster Rancher Battle Card GB
- Quest for Camelot
- R-Type DX
- Rampage: World Tour
- Test Drive 6
- Test Drive Off-Road 3
- Tetris DX

== See also ==
- Backward compatibility
- Cross-platform software
- Flippy disk
- Hybrid disc
