= Napoleon I: The Campaigns 1805–1814 =

1991 video game

Napoleon I: The Campaigns 1805-1814
- Developer: Storm Computers Ltd.
- Publisher: Internecine
- Platforms: Amiga; Atari ST
- Release: 1991
- Genre: Strategy

Napoleon I: The Campaigns 1805–1814 is a 1991 video game published by RAW Entertainment.

== Gameplay ==
Napoleon I is a game in which players join the emperor Napoleon's campaign with the coalition allied against him. The game has three campaigns based on historical scenarios: the Grande Armee against the forces of Austria and Russia (1805), two campaigns involving Napoleon's forces in France and surrounding countries (1806, 1809), and the French against multiple countries (1813-1814). Players can play against the computer or a human opponent, and give orders to their troops, and maintain supply lines.

== Reception ==
Reception

Review scores
Publication	Score
Amiga Action	68%
Amiga Power	39%

Wyatt Lee reviewed the game for Computer Gaming World, and stated that "What Napoleon I: The Campaigns 1805–1814 happens to be is a fast-playing, versatile campaign game that fills a void in the genre of computer games based on the Napoleonic era."

The reviewer for Amiga Power praised the game's historical accuracy, but said that "when it comes to playing the game you keep going to make a cup of tea just to get a little excitement."

Jonathan Davies for Amiga Action found that the game would have no appeal to novice players, calling it "a tough, uncompromising, workmanlike simulation".
