= Flink =

1994 video game

- European box art
- Developer: Psygnosis
- Publishers: EU: Psygnosis; NA: Vic Tokai
- Designer: Henk Nieborg
- Platforms: CD32, Mega Drive, Mega CD/Sega CD
- Release: CD32; 1994; Mega Drive: EU: November 1994; Sega CD: EU: 1994; NA: February 1995
- Genre: Platform
- Mode: Single-player

Flink (full name: The Misadventures of Flink according to the title screen) is a 1994 platform video game developed by former members of Thalion and published by Psygnosis.

== Development and release ==
The Amiga CD32 and Mega CD versions relied on CD-ROM media to store large levels, highly detailed graphics, and high-quality music. Except for the CD soundtrack, the Mega Drive and Mega CD versions are identical. All versions were published in Europe by Psygnosis, but only the Mega CD version was released in the United States, where it was published by Vic Tokai. Flink is one of the few Amiga CD32 titles not to see a release for the Amiga home computer on which the CD32's hardware is based. The creators, Erwin Kloibhofer, Henk Nieborg, and Matthias Steinwachs, had previously worked on the Thalion game Lionheart for the Amiga 500.

The soundtrack was composed by Matthias Steinwachs, who described its development in a February 1995 issue of Sega Magazin. Steinwachs initially composed the music using MIDI software before adapting it to the Mega Drive's sound hardware, which provided six FM voices. With assistance from programmer Andreas Molnar, he converted the compositions using the Loudness sound system. The production involved 15 musical pieces, which were repeatedly revised following feedback from the game's developers, including programmer Erwin Kloibhofer and artist Henk Nieborg. Steinwachs estimated that the entire process took approximately five months.

The CD soundtrack was produced separately for the Mega-CD version, using synthesizer arrangements and mastering the recordings onto digital audio tape. Final audio processing took place at Wind, a recording studio in Berlin.

In 1996, Kloibhofer and Nieborg collaborated one last time on The Adventures of Lomax for the PlayStation and Microsoft Windows.

== Reception ==
Reviewing the Mega CD version, GamePro assessed that the quality of the gameplay, graphics, and sound are solid, but that the style is unbearably cutesy, enjoyable only "for an audience that thinks Mickey Mouse is too grown up." Next Generation, while deriding the game for using the same platforming basics as the by-then ten-year-old Super Mario Bros., acknowledged that the mechanics for casting spells was an original touch, and praised the overall strong challenge. They gave it three out of five stars, concluding, "Flink comes perilously close to being so average it makes your brain begin to bleed, but the game still comes up with enough inventive touches, details, and sharp, colorful graphics so that, in the final outcome, the positives outweigh the negatives." Diehard GameFan's reviewers were extremely positive, giving it near-perfect scores and calling it "simply put the best Sega CD action game that I have ever played."
