= Transworld =

Trans World or Transworld may refer to:

== Companies ==
- Trans World Airlines (TWA)
  - Trans World Connection, a affiliated brand name of the airline
  - Trans World Corporation, a holding company for the airline
  - Trans World Express, a regional carrier for the airline
- Transworld Associates, a fiber optic undersea cable in Pakistan
- Trans World Communications, a defunct UK radio broadcasting company
- Trans World Entertainment, an American chain of entertainment media retail stores
- Trans World International, an event company of International Management Group (IMG)
  - Trans World Sport, a sports-related television program produced by Trans World International
- Trans World Radio, a Christian broadcasting company
- Trans-World Group, a London-based aluminium company, active in Russia in the 1990s

== Magazines ==
- Transworld Motocross, a motocross magazine
- Transworld Skateboarding, a skateboarding magazine
- Transworld Snowboarding, a snowboarding magazine

== Other uses ==
- Transworld (horse), a racehorse
- Trans World (video game) (1990), business simulation
- Transworld (publisher), a publishing company in the United Kingdom

== See also ==
- Trans (disambiguation)
- World (disambiguation)
