= PC Leisure =

- Editor: Ciarán Brennan; Steve Cooke; Garth Sumpter; Christina Erskine
- Staff writers: Matt Regan
- Categories: Computer magazines
- Frequency: Quarterly then bimonthly
- Publisher: Terry Pratt
- First issue: Spring 1990
- Final issue Number: Sep/Oct 1991; 9
- Company: EMAP
- Country: United Kingdom
- Based in: Farringdon, London
- Language: English
- ISSN: 0959-1567

PC Leisure was the United Kingdom's first magazine dedicated exclusively to IBM PC compatible (PC) entertainment and was published by EMAP between spring 1990 and September 1991. A total of nine issues were published in its lifetime, the first four being quarterly with the remaining five bimonthly. The magazine was eventually incorporated into PC Review, a new monthly publication launched on October 15, 1991.

== History ==
Within the UK prior to PC Leisure's release, PC entertainment news was supplied via general computing and multi-format magazines such as The One and New Computer Express, but by 1990 the PC entertainment market had sufficiently developed to warrant the introduction of a dedicated magazine.

In November 1989, EMAP tested the waters by including a free PC Leisure preview copy along with What Personal Computer, and the feedback from this venture filled the letters section of the launch issue the following spring.

In May 1991, PC Leisure became the recipient of the PC coverage originally published within the pages of the 16-bit multi-format magazine The One, as EMAP decided to split it into The One for Amiga Games and The One for ST Games. A number of the staff moved to working on The One for Amiga Games.

The final issue #9 Sep/Oct 1991 included a two-page special across pages 28 and 29 stating that the magazine was going to be renamed PC Review and released monthly from October 15, 1991.

== Staff ==
=== Editors ===
- Ciarán Brennan, Spring 1990 to Jan/Feb 1991
- Steve Cooke, Mar/Apr 1991 only
- Garth Sumpter, May/Jun 1991 to Jul/Aug 1991
- Christina Erskine, Sep/Oct 1991 only

=== Art Editor ===
- Jim Willis

=== Designers ===
Jenny Abrook, Andy Beswick, Gregory Brown, Allister Cordice, Pete Hawkes, Nick Howells, Gareth Jones, Yvette Nicholls, Simon Poulter, Richard Slater, Andrea Walker and Jim Willis.

=== Photographer ===
- Ian Watson

=== Contributors ===
Rob Beattie, Kelly Beswick, Neil Blaber, Matt Bloomfield, Paul Boughton, Clive Bremner, Robert Browning, John Cook, Steve Cooke, Tony Dillon, Jim Douglas, Alan Dykes, Christina Erskine, David Fitzgerald, Rik Haynes, Ed Henning, Gordon Houghton, Fiona Keating, Steve Keen, Eugene Lacey, Gary Liddon, Chris Long, Declan McColgan, Steve Merritt, John Minson, Tony Naqvi, Matt Nicholson, Frank O'Hara, Lee Paddon, Russell Patient, Mike Pattenden, Mark Patterson, Gary Penn, Paul Presley, Matt Regan, Gail Robinson, Laurence Scotford, Garth Sumpter, Alastair Swinnerton, Jimmy Taylor, David Upchurch, Austin Walsh and Gary Whitta.

== See also ==
- Historical EMAP Magazines
- The One
