= 5th Gear =

5th Gear may refer to:

- Fifth Gear, a British television show formerly known as "5th Gear"
- 5th Gear (album), an album by Brad Paisley
- 5th Gear (video game), a video game for the Commodore 64, Amiga and Atari ST

== See also ==
- Transmission (mechanics), for the fifth gear in mechanics
