= Wings of Death =

1990 video game

- Developer(s): Eclipse Software
- Publisher(s): Thalion Software
- Designer(s): Marc Rosocha
- Programmer(s): Marc Rosocha
- Artist(s): Erik Simon
- Writer(s): Richard Karsmakers
- Composer(s): Jochen Hippel
- Platform(s): Amiga, Atari ST
- Release: 1990
- Genre(s): Scrolling shooter
- Mode(s): Single-player

Wings of Death is a 1990 vertically scrolling shooter developed by Eclipse Software and published by Thalion Software for the Atari ST, then ported to the Amiga. In Wings of Death, the player controls a mage turned into a winged creature on a quest to defeat a wicked witch. The game was well received and was followed by the science fiction-themed sequel Lethal Xcess in 1991.

== Gameplay ==
Despite its fantasy setting, Wings of Death is a standard vertically scrolling shooter in which multiple enemies in formation enter the screen from above and can either be avoided or destroyed to release power-ups. Each weapon can be upgraded several times, yielding generally more powerful versions. Changing to another weapon resets the player's upgrades. The player may transform into several forms, including a giant eagle, a griffon, and a dragon.

== Plot ==
A spell of the evil witch queen Xandrilia transformed her hated rival, the magician Sagyr, into a winged creature. Now the player's role is to guide Sagyr in his quest to defeat the witch for once and for all, and revert into a human being. His quest takes place through seven levels, from Sagyr's castle to Xandrilia's domain.

== Reception ==
Trenton Webb of Amiga Format, who gave the Amiga version a review rating of 76%, wrote Wings of Death is "chaotic fun, but relies too heavily on luck." Paul Roundell of Amiga Computing later opined the game was "underrated on its release."

== Legacy ==
A sequel to Wings of Death was released in 1991 for the same platforms. In it, the returning Sagyr fights on against Xandrilia's descendants after being transported into a distant future.
