= Leavin' Teramis =

1990 video game

- Developer(s): Thalion Software
- Publisher(s): GER: Thalion Software; EU: Grandslam Entertainments
- Platform(s): Atari ST, Amiga
- Release: EU: 1990
- Genre(s): Shoot 'em up
- Mode(s): Single-player

Leavin' Teramis is a 1990 run and gun video game developed and published by Thalion Software for the Atari ST. A port for the Amiga was released a few months later.

== Gameplay ==
The player is Nigel MacGibbons and has awoken with a hangover in a spaceship full of alien monsters. Nigel has to blast his way through eight levels in a time limit. The game is a run and gun shooter depicted from a top down perspective.

== Reception ==
Reception

Review scores
Publication	Score
ACE	810/1000 (ST)
Aktueller Software Markt	7/12 (ST, Amiga)
ST Action	74%
The Games Machine (UK)	60% (ST)
Amiga Joker	65%

Aktueller Software Markt said the game is a technical masterpiece but the gameplay has too little variety. Amiga Joker recommended the game to action game fans but said casual gamers should try it before buying. The Games Machine compared the game unfavourable to Sega's Alien Syndrome and in conclusion said: "Leave this on the shelves; give it a miss." ACE summarized: "Leavin' Teramis doesn't attempt to be original in any way. What it does do very well is provide shoot 'em up addicts with a very humorous, colourful, and fast way to while away a good few hours." ST Action compared the game to Alien Syndrome, Commando, and Gauntlet and said: "Teramis is a polished hybrid that possesses attractive graphics and more importantly, that "just-one-more-go" feel."
