= The Flintstones (1988 video game) =

- Master system cover art
- Developers: Teque Software Development; Tiertex (Master System)
- Publisher: Grandslam Entertainments
- Composer: Ben Daglish
- Platforms: Amiga; Amstrad CPC; Atari ST; Commodore 64; MSX; Master System; ZX Spectrum
- Release: EU: 1988; EU: January 1992; (Master System)
- Mode: Single-player

The Flintstones is a 1988 video game based on the 1960s television series The Flintstones. The game was developed by Teque Software Development and published by Grandslam Entertainments. The game was released in Europe in 1988, for Amiga, Amstrad CPC, Atari ST, Commodore 64, MSX, and ZX Spectrum. A version for the Master System was released in 1991.

== Gameplay ==
Each version of The Flintstones features identical gameplay. The game contains four levels. The story begins with Fred Flintstone finishing work at a rock quarry and exclaiming "Yabba dabba doo!" which is the game's only spoken line of dialogue, achieved through speech synthesis. For the remainder of the game, character interactions are done through speech balloons.

Fred wants to bowl with Barney Rubble at a bowling alley, but Fred's wife, Wilma, tells him that he must paint their living room first for the arrival of her mother. Playing as Fred, the player must paint the room while also preventing his young daughter, Pebbles, from scribbling on the walls. The player's paintbrush is a squirrel. When stopping Pebbles, the squirrel sometimes runs away and must be captured.

In the second level, Fred must race to the bowling alley while avoiding rocks on the road. Hitting a rock results in the vehicle losing a wheel, requiring the player to search for a replacement and get back on the road. The third level is played as a bowling game between Fred and Barney, with the two players taking turns. In the final level, Fred returns home and discovers that Pebbles is missing from the house. He finds her climbing a construction site and competes against Barney to rescue her, while avoiding nuts and bolts.

A practice mode allows the player to explore each area. A rendition of the theme music from the television series was created by Ben Daglish, and is present throughout the game, except for the ZX Spectrum version.

== Reception ==
Reception

Review scores
Publication	Score
Atari ST User	6/10 (Atari ST)
The Games Machine	68% (Amstrad CPC); 75% (Atari ST); 76% (Amiga); 63% (Commodore 64); 65% (Spectrum)
ST Action	49% (Atari ST)
Zzap!64	40% (Commodore 64)

The Games Machine criticized the bowling level for "the long-winded restacking of the pins after each bowl – this is taking realism too far." The magazine praised the music and noted that the graphics "could challenge the TV cartoon", and concluded, "If you have the patience, The Flintstones could provide an amusing, if generally tough challenge." The magazine noted that the Atari ST version was identical to the Amiga version, except for slightly poorer sound.

Reviewing the Amstrad CPC, Commodore 64 and ZX Spectrum versions, The Games Machine wrote that each version retained the "impressive cartoon-like" graphics and difficult gameplay of the earlier versions. The magazine wrote, "The Commodore version moves at a fair rate, while the Spectrum and Amstrad CPC versions are slow enough to cause frustration."

Chris Jenkins of Computer and Video Games praised the graphics and sound, but considered the bowling level to be the "poorest" portion of the game. Jenkins concluded that the game "is a polished and professional product which deserves to be seen." John Butters of Atari ST User praised the music and sound, and called the graphics "immaculate," but concluded that the game "soon became frustrating rather than addictive". Andy Richards, also of Atari ST User, praised the music, sound, gameplay, and graphics.

One reviewer for ST Action wrote that the painting level "is clever, infuriating, and taxing, but the bowling scene could have been more thoughtfully designed." Another reviewer for ST Action wrote, "Sluggish controls and the slow speed make the painting scene unbelievably tedious and, sadly the bowling scene is, if anything, worse. A lot of time is wasted as the player resets the pins, or whilst Barney bowls, and this means just sitting and waiting until it is your turn again. There is nothing about this program I can recommend."

Paul Glancey of Zzap!64 wrote about the Commodore 64 version, "Poor sprites and feeble backgrounds coupled with a grating rendition of the Flintstones theme tune create a bad impression, and frustrating controls in the painting section do not enthrall. The sub-games are dated – a paint and collect game in '88?! – and the basic Tenth Frame bowling doesn't encourage the player to reach the final section. TV licences work rarely, if at all; The Flintstones certainly doesn't." Paul Sumner, also of Zzap!64, wrote that neither Fred or Barney resembled their television counterparts, but praised the sound and music. Sumner wrote that the gameplay "is a little difficult at first, due mainly to the slightly unresponsive control. But perseverance does reap some reward, though I personally found the game to be too difficult to warrant extensive play."
