= A320 (disambiguation) =

A320 usually refers to the Airbus A320 family of short- to medium-range commercial passenger airliners manufactured by Airbus.

A320 may also refer to:

- "A320" (song) by the Foo Fighters, from the 1998 soundtrack of Godzilla
- A320 Airbus (video game), a 1991 flight simulator computer game
- A320 road (Great Britain)
- Dingoo A320, a micro-sized gaming handheld that supports music and video playback and open game development
- The A320 chipset for AMD's Socket AM4 microprocessor platform
