= Atomix (video game) =

1990 video game

- Developer: Günter Krämer (as "Softtouch")
- Publisher: Thalion Software
- Platforms: MS-DOS, Amiga, Commodore 64, Atari ST
- Release: 1990
- Genre: Tile-based puzzle
- Modes: Single-player, multiplayer

Atomix is a puzzle video game developed by Günter Krämer (as "Softtouch") and published by Thalion Software, released for the Amiga and other personal computers in late 1990. The object of the game is to assemble molecules from compound atoms by moving the atoms on a two-dimensional playfield.

Atomix was received positively; reviewers noted the game's addictiveness and enjoyable gameplay, though criticized its repetitiveness.

== Gameplay ==
Each level requires the player to assemble a molecule of a different chemical compound.

Atomix takes place on a playfield consisting of a number of walls, with the atoms scattered throughout. The player is tasked with assembling a molecule from the atoms. The atoms must be arranged to exactly match the molecule displayed on the left side of the screen. The player can choose an atom and move it in any of the four cardinal directions. A moved atom keeps sliding in one direction until it hits a wall or another atom. Solving the puzzles requires strategic planning in moving the atoms, and on later levels with little free space, even finding room for the completed molecule can be a problem. Once the molecule is assembled, the player is given a score; the faster the puzzle was completed, the higher the score.

Each puzzle must be completed within a time limit. A portion of the player's score can be spent to restart a failed puzzle. The entire game consists of 30 puzzles of increasing difficulty. In addition, after every five puzzles, there is a bonus level where the player must move laboratory flasks filled with various amounts of liquid to arrange them from empty to full.

The game also offers a two-player mode, where two players work on the same puzzle; they take turns which last up to thirty seconds.

== Development ==
Amiga Format reviewed a pre-release version in its May, 1990 issue. It was almost a complete version of the game although it lacked sound.

Initially the game was released for Amiga, Atari ST and the IBM PC; as of May 1990, the C64 version was not yet planned, and was only released a few months later. A ZX Spectrum version was also planned. It was to be distributed by U.S. Gold, but was never released.

The game was published for Enterprise 128 in 2006, and this version was written by Zoltán Povázsay from Hungary.

A clone for the Atari Jaguar called Atomic has been released in 2006, written by Sébastien Briais (AKA Seb from the Removers). A second version called Atomic Reloaded has been released in 2009.

== Reception ==
Atomix received warm reactions from reviewers. They stated that it was highly enjoyable and addictive despite its high difficulty level. Reviewers also pointed out the possible educational application of the game.

However, certain reviewers criticized the game for its repetitiveness and stated that it lacked replayability. Some reviewers also wrote about the game's unoriginality, noting similarities to earlier games, Xor and Leonardo.

Graphics were generally considered adequate, though not spectacular; Zzap!64 called them "a bit dull and repetitive" and "simplistic, but slick and effective", while CU Amiga remarked that despite their simplicity, they "create a nice, tidy display". The soundtrack was found enjoyable, though the Commodore Format reviewer considered it annoyingly repetitive.

Atomix has been the subject of scientific research in computational complexity theory. When generalized to puzzles of arbitrary sizes, the problem of determining whether an Atomix puzzle has a solution is PSPACE-complete. Some heuristic approaches have been considered.

== Legacy ==
Several open source clones of Atomix exist: Atomiks, GNOME Atomix, KAtomic and WAtomic.
