= Amberstar =

1992 video game

- Amiga cover art
- Developer: Thalion Software
- Publisher: Thalion Software
- Producer: Erik Simon
- Designer: Karsten Köper
- Programmer: Jurie Horneman
- Artist: Monika Krawinkel
- Composer: Jochen Hippel
- Platforms: Amiga, Atari ST, MS-DOS
- Release: 1992
- Genre: Role-playing
- Mode: Single player

Amberstar is the first installment in Thalion Software's never-finished role-playing video game trilogy. Although considerably more advanced, the game has numerous similarities to Thalion's earlier game Dragonflight, and was thought to be a sequel by many fans. As with most of Thalion's other releases, the public interest was somewhat limited. A sequel, Ambermoon, was released in 1993.

== Plot ==
The game is set in the fictional world of Lyramion and begins with the player situated at the graves of his parents. As the player sets out for adventure, it becomes apparent that an evil entity named Lord Tarbos, who was imprisoned a thousand years earlier, is about to be released again to wreak havoc upon Lyramion. The player, helped by the various adventurers who join the party along the way, must recover the thirteen missing pieces of the Amberstar, the talisman that initially banished Lord Tarbos, to defeat the demon once again.

== Development ==
The musical score is by Thalion's Jochen Hippel.

== Reception ==
Amberstar received mixed to positive reviews in Germany and the UK. Many critics praised the deep storyline while feeling that the graphics were a bit outdated in comparison to other current RPGs such as Ultima Underworld or Might and Magic: Clouds of Xeen.

The One gave the Amiga version of Amberstar an overall score of 78%, comparing its gameplay to Ultima VI and Eye of the Beholder, stating that it "[mixes] the depth, character interaction and size of [Ultima VI] with the first-person 3D immediacy of [Eye of the Beholder]". The One praises the amount of content in Amberstar, punctuating this by saying "No matter what your predicament, there's always something new to see or do." The One criticises Amberstar's graphics, stating that "the 3D bits are by-and-large redundant, the graphics are unattractive, direct action with the 3D environment is minimal", as well as the UI, calling it "over-complicated and not particularly elegant", furthermore saying "a little more design forethought" would improve Amberstar's overall appeal. The One also criticises Amberstar's switching back and forth between a first-person perspective and a third-person top-down perspective, and questions the purpose of this design decision.

Magazine	Date	Score
Amiga Action	Oct 1992	91%
Amiga Format	Jan 1993	81%
CU Amiga	Dec 1992	65%
The One	Dec 1992	78%
DatorMagazin	Jan 1993	64%
Amiga Joker	Mar 1992	82%
ST Action	Sep 1992	92%
ST Format	Dec 1992	73%
ST User	Oct 1992	82%
ST Review	Jan 1993	83%
Power Play	Mar 1992	85%
ASM	Mar 1992	67%
PlayTime	May 1992	87%
PC Joker	Jan 1993	76%

== Legacy ==
While planned as the first part in a trilogy, Amberstar was succeeded by only one sequel called Ambermoon. Unlike Amberstar, Ambermoon was released only on Amiga. Disappointing sales of both Amberstar and Ambermoon led Thalion Software to close after the sequel's German release. The title of what was supposed to be the third and final game was disclosed by game creator Karsten Köper as being AmberWorlds. On May 14, 2023, the surviving source code for the game and its sequel Ambermoon was uploaded on GitHub by Jurie Horneman, programmer of both games.
