= Chambers of Shaolin =

1989 video game

- Developer: Thalion Software
- Publisher: Grandslam Entertainment
- Composer: Jochen Hippel
- Platforms: Amiga, CD32, Atari ST, Commodore 64
- Release: 1989
- Genre: Beat 'em up
- Modes: Single-player, multiplayer

Chambers of Shaolin is a 1989 beat 'em up video game first released for the Amiga then ported to the Atari ST and Commodore 64. The game was inspired by the 1978 film The 36th Chamber of Shaolin.

== Plot ==
Hang Foy Qua traveled from his hometown of Queping, to the monastery of Shaolin in Tibet in order to train under the temple. Hang's younger sister has been kidnapped by the emperor. By conquering the trials and facing other fighters, Hang must become a fighting master and save his sister from a tyrannical government.

== Gameplay ==
The game offers two distinct styles of gameplay. Initially, the player must clear six tests that showcase the player's skill in combat disciplines, specifically Agility, Balance, Fire, Speed, Stick, and Strength. Clearing the trials requires reacting to (dodging) obstacles thrown at the player, such as dodging projectiles in the Agility and Stick tests, and hitting buttons with the correct timing as in the Balance and Fire tests.

After passing the tests, the player is offered the chance to clear rounds of 1-on-1 fights with other Shaolin fighters. Performance in the previous trials impacts the player's skillset and strengths against other fighters.

== Reception ==
Overall, reception for the game was positive, praising its gameplay and handling.

In a retrospective review, Retro Gamer called it graphically unimpressive, but found the gameplay and controls surprisingly sharp for the time.
