= Terry's Big Adventure =

1989 video game

- Developer: Gametec
- Publisher: Shades Software
- Designer: Gary Walton
- Composer: Allister Brimble
- Platforms: Commodore 64 / C128, Amiga, Atari ST
- Release: 1989
- Genre: Platformer
- Mode: Single-player

Terry's Big Adventure is a game published by Shades Software in 1989 for use on the Atari ST, Commodore 64 and Commodore 128, and by Grandslam Interactive for Amiga.

== Gameplay ==
To return home, young Terry must traverse 12 scenarios, armed only with his yo-yo, which causes him to jump backward when used. Along the way he can collect mushrooms and collect letters that give special powers, but he must defend himself against a varied array of enemies, which includes hedgehogs, balloons, and stars.

== Reception ==
The Games Machine noted its similarities with Super Mario Bros. in terms of gameplay, graphics, and specific ideas such as bonus stages and hidden rooms, but praised the yo-yo as an original weapon, that "can provide some worrying moments - as can the semi-incontrollable leaps and inertia". It gave a 78/100 rating to the Atari ST version, and a 74/100 rating to its Commodore counterpart.

Zzap!64 gave the game an 82/100 rating, describing it as "instantly playable" and noting the game "isn't anything new over Giana Sisters but it's well presented and nicely priced".

German magazine Amiga Joker gave the game a 68/100 rating, mainly criticizing its overly simple graphics and its music theme, so annoying "you'd rather stuff some cotton wool into your ears".
