= Timeball =

1990 video game

- TurboGrafx-16 cover art
- Developer: Now Production
- Publishers: TurboGrafx-16; NEC, Hudson Soft; X68000, Game Boy; Broderbund, Tonkin House
- Programmer: Manuel Constantinidis (original game)
- Platforms: TurboGrafx-16, Game Boy, X68000
- Release: TurboGrafx-16: JP: February 23, 1990; NA: September 12, 1991
- Genre: Puzzle
- Modes: Single-player, multiplayer

Timeball is a puzzle video game released by NEC for the TurboGrafx-16. The object of the game is to guide a ball along pieces of track by moving tiles like a sliding puzzle. The game's name in Japan is Blodia, an anagram of Diablo, the title of a computer game upon which Blodia is based. Versions of Blodia were released exclusively in Japan for the original Game Boy and the X68000. A spin-off titled Blodia Land: Puzzle Quest was released for the Famicom, replacing the ball with cartoon dinosaur-like characters. These versions were developed by Tonkin House and published by Broderbund.

== Gameplay ==
Players must arrange the tiles so the ball traverses all pieces of track.

The grid on screen is composed of tiles. Some tiles have a piece of road, and a black tile represents "the void", an area where one can drag the tile nearby in order to complete a road which will be taken by a ball that will follow the path. Players must arrange the tiles such that the ball traverses all sections of track. The ball can be sped up by pressing a button. If the ball reaches a tile without a piece of track, it falls out of play.

The game also includes a level editor which allows for the creation of custom puzzles. An earlier "prototype" version without the level editor was published for the TI-99/4a and other computers as "Diablo" in 1985.

== Release and reception ==
Reception

Review scores
Publication	Score
Aktueller Software Markt	3/10, 3/10, 7/10, 8/10, 6/10
Famitsu	7/10, 6/10, 8/10, 8/10
Gekkan PC Engine	80/100, 80/100, 75/100, 85/100, 80/100
Génération 4	80/100
Power Play	76/100

Timeball was released as Blodia for the PC Engine in Japan on February 23, 1990.

== See also ==
- Loco-Motion
