= Thalion Software =

German video game company

- Industry: Video games
- Founded: 1988
- Defunct: 1994
- Headquarters: Gütersloh, Germany
- Number of employees: 11 (1992)

Thalion Software was a German video game developer and publisher formed by members of the Atari ST demoscene in October 1988, in Gütersloh, Germany. The main aim of Thalion Software was to produce cutting edge technology games. Despite the technical quality, sales of the games never really matched expectations and by the end of 1994 the developers had left and the company eventually closed. The two founders were Erik Simon (of The Exceptions) and Holger Flöttmann. Flöttmann later went on to found another video games company, Ascaron.

== Game releases ==
- Warp (1989)
- Chambers of Shaolin (1989)
- The Seven Gates of Jambala (1989)
- Leavin' Teramis (1990)
- Atomix (1990)
- Dragonflight (1990)
- Wings of Death (precursor of Lethal Xcess) (1990)
- Magic Lines (1990)
- Tower FRA (1990)
- Enchanted Land (1990)
- A Prehistoric Tale (1991)
- Ghost Battle (1991)
- Tangram (1991)
- Trex Warrior (1991)
- A320 Airbus (1991)
- Amberstar (1992)
- Neuronics (1992)
- No Second Prize (1992)
- Lionheart (1993)
- A320 Airbus Edition:Europa (1993)
- A320 Airbus Edition:USA (1993)
- Ambermoon (1993)

== Employees (in no order) ==
Sources:

- Holger Flöttmann
- Erik Simon (ES/TEX)
- Jochen Hippel (MadMax/TEX)
- Michael Raasch (Daryl/TEX)
- Udo Fischer (-ME-/TEX)
- Günter Bitz (6719/TEX)
- Michael Bittner (Hexogen/TNT Crew)
- Jurie Horneman (Relayer/QX)
- Karsten Köper
- Richard Karsmakers (Cronos/QX)
- Marc Rosocha
- Stefan Kimmlingen (Tyrem/TLB)
- Tim Moss (Manikin/TLB)
- David Moss (SPAZ/TLB)
- Stefan Posthuma (Digital Insanity/TLB)
- Christian Jungen (TNT)
- Niklas Malmqvist (Tanis/TCB)
- Niclas Thisell (Nic/TCB)
- Anders Suurkuusk (Jas/TCB)
- Thorsten Mutschall (GoGo/TCB)
- Klaus-Peter Plog (The Blue Devil/Gigabyte Crew)
- Michael Grohe
- Michael Krause
- Fabian Hammer (Oxygene/DF)
- Markus Laatsch (Chuck/Foxx)
- Tim Lange
- Erwin Kloibhofer
- Henk Nieborg
- Matthias Steinwachs
- Günter Schmitz
- Matthias Sykosch
- Frank Ußner
- Gino Fehr
- Monika Krawinkel
- Manuela Scholz
- Tobias Franz
- Günter Krämer
- Rolf Steffens
- 'Manfred Nöcken
- Uwe Damm
- Celal Kandemiroglu
- Dieter Rottermund
- Michael Hellmich
- David John Rowe
