= Lethal Xcess =

1991 video game

- Cover art by Celal Kandemiroglu
- Developers: X-Troll; Gigabyte Crew
- Publisher: Eclipse Software
- Producer: Marc Rosocha
- Designers: Heinz Rudolf; Claus Frein; Marc Rosocha
- Programmer: Claus Frein
- Artist: Heinz Rudolf
- Writer: Richard Karsmakers
- Composer: Jochen Hippel
- Platforms: Amiga, Atari ST
- Release: 1991
- Genre: Shoot 'em up
- Modes: Single-player, multiplayer

Lethal Xcess, also known as Lethal Xcess: Wings of Death II or just Wings of Death II, is a shoot 'em up game developed by two members of demo crew X-Troll and published by Eclipse Software in 1991 for the Atari ST and Amiga. It is a sequel to 1990's Wings of Death, in which its wizard hero goes into the far future to fight the descendants of the evil witch that he had defeated in the first game. Despite having been acclaimed by critics, the game was a commercial failure.

== Plot ==
The great magician Sagyr has won over his nemesis, the wicked witch Xandrilia, and regained the human shape of his former self. But Xandrilia's curse sends him 3,000 years in the future. There he finds out that the witch's posterity, known as the Xandrilians, plan to rule the universe with an army of monsters and machines. Determined to stop the forces of darkness, Sagyr pilots a small combat spacecraft on a desperate mission to destroy the planet where the Xandrilians live.

== Development ==
Lethal Xcess was originally it was planned to be an independent release, but in the end it became the sequel to Wings of Death where its original story was about Sagyr having been again turned into a gryphon and fighting a restored Xandrilia in fantasy setting, to be titled Xandrilia's Revenge, before it was decided it would a be a science fiction game. Lethal Xcess has been the first commercial project of Heinz Rudolf and Claus Frein, although they had some offers before; due to the disappointing sales, both quit the gaming industry and became IT consultants. While it is a rather standard shooter on the Amiga platform, the game is one of the technically most impressive titles for the Atari ST. Besides many technically impressive features, such as digital sound, sync-scrolling, overscan, and full two-player support, all original copies of Lethal Xcess featured dual format, which allowed the Amiga and Atari versions to boot from the very same disk. An abortive Commodore 64 version was also under development by a different team.

== Reception ==
The Amiga version of the game was well received, including the review scores of 84% from Amiga Action, 83% from Amiga Computing, 70% from Amiga Power, 87% from Génération 4, and 86% from Joystick. It received an overall rating of 9 out of 10 from both ST News and ST Graveyard, while Play Time gave 77% for the Amiga and 74% for the Atari ST.
