= Grandslam Interactive =

British video game publisher

Grandslam Interactive Ltd. (formerly Grandslam Entertainments Ltd. and later Grandslam Video Ltd.) was a video games software house based in Britain. It was formed in late 1987 from a management buy-out of Argus Press Software by former Argus Managing Director, Stephen Hall and close friend David C. Dudman. Grandslam developed and published many games for home computers during the 1980s and 1990s. Originally based in central London, the offices were relocated to Croydon in 1990.

== List of games ==
1988

- Terramex
- Chubby Gristle
- Espionage
- City Survivor
- The Flintstones
- Pac-Land
- Pac-Mania
- Peter Beardsley's International Football
- Alternate Reality: The City

1989

- The Running Man
- Saint & Greavsie
- Thunderbirds
- Chambers of Shaolin
- Warp
- Terry's Big Adventure
- Trivia - The Ultimate Quest
- The Seven Gates of Jambala

1990

- The Hunt for Red October
- Scramble Spirits
- Space Harrier II
- Leavin' Teramis
- Dragonflight

1991

- England Championship Special

1992

- Die Hard 2: Die Harder
- Nick Faldo's Championship Golf
- Stone Age

1993

- Liverpool: The Computer Game
- Beastlord
- Armaeth: The Lost Kingdom
- Legend of Myra

1994

- Bump 'N' Burn
- Nick Faldo's Championship Golf
- Reunion
- Beavers
- ITS Cricket: International Test Series

1995

- Base Jumpers
- ITS Cricket: International Test Series

Unpublished

- Seven Swords of Mendor
- Fighting Survivor
- Realms of Darkness
