= A320 Airbus (video game) =

1991 video game

- Developer: Thalion Software
- Publisher: Thalion Software
- Designer: Rainer Bopf
- Platforms: Amiga, Atari ST, MS-DOS
- Release: 1991, 1993
- Genre: Flight simulator
- Mode: Single-player

A320 Airbus is an amateur flight simulation video game released in 1991 in which the player pilots an Airbus A320. The game was developed over three years with cooperation from Lufthansa, Deutsche Airbus, and Jeppesen. The game was written by Rainer Bopf for the Amiga and converted to the Atari ST by Christian Jungen. The most recent version of the game is 1.44.

In 1993, Thalion published two data disks which could be played as a separate game. They were based on the latest version of the game engine, but focused on different flying areas. Europe Edition covered the area of Europe and USA Edition covered the area of USA. In the latter the player was able to choose the region of West Coast USA or North East USA.

In 1995, Games 4 Europe published an official sequel called A320 Airbus Vol. 2. It was entirely written by Rainer Bopf with no additional help from third parties.
