= Horror Zombies from the Crypt =

1990 video game

- Developer: Millennium Interactive
- Publisher: U.S. Gold
- Platforms: Amiga, Atari ST, MS-DOS
- Release: 1990
- Genre: Platform
- Mode: Single-player

Horror Zombies from the Crypt is a platform game developed by Millennium Interactive and published by U.S. Gold in 1990 for Amiga, Atari ST, and MS-DOS.

Inspired by 1950s horror movies, the player assumes the role of a Count Frederick Valdemar and enters a mansion full of ghastly creatures such as grim reapers, vampires, zombies and mummies. Music in the game includes Montagues and Capulets, played during the introduction.

== Gameplay ==
Creatures attempt to stop the Count as he ventures through 6 levels in search for skulls. All skulls must be collected before the player may exit the level. Before each level there is an introductory screen which explains the goal of the level.
