= Trans World (video game) =

1990 video game

- European cover art
- Developer: Mario Knezovic
- Publishers: NA: Starbyte Software; EU: Starbyte Software
- Artist: Oliver Lindau
- Composers: Markus Schneider; Jochen Hippel (ST)
- Platforms: Amiga, Atari ST, Commodore 64, MS-DOS
- Release: NA: 1990; EU: 1990
- Genre: Strategy
- Mode: Single-player

Trans World is a business simulation video game for the Amiga, Atari ST, Commodore 64, and MS-DOS published by Starbyte Software in 1990.

== Gameplay ==
The player takes control of a new trucking company and competes against up to either three other human or computer players to make the most money. The game has two modes to choose from, a continuous play mode that plays indefinitely or a timed mode that runs a select number of turns. Players control all aspects of the company from purchasing new trucks to hiring mechanics to building new offices.

Each round of the game controls one day of game time with each player taking a turn. Periodically, a random event will happen which can either help or hinder the player's company. Some events are offers to have goods delivered while others are sick days that skip the player's turn. The game ends when a player chooses to end it or when the selected number of rounds have been completed. The winner is the player with the most money at the game's end.
