= The Exceptions =

The Exceptions were a German demo group formed in the 1980s. They were early pioneers writing demos for the Atari ST platform.

== History ==
Usually known by the shortened form Tex they formed in the spring 1986 when Udo Fischer was still a teenager. On obtaining an Atari ST they started exploring what they could do with this new hardware. After finding the initial Basic implementation limiting, they moved onto writing some simple graphical demonstration computer programs in assembly.

After an early period of cracking games software and adding these demo screens to the loaders they eventually realised the coding was more fun. Their first breakthrough was a demo called the Little Color Demo released in the fall of 1987. It was however the release of the then large B.I.G Demo (Best In Galaxy) which propelled them to prominence. It featured a large collection of music ported from various Commodore 64 games by their recently joined musician Jochen Hippel.

They later joined a demo group alliance known as The Union where they were involved in some screens of The Union Demo.

== Release history ==
The Exceptions released many small cracktros and intros before moving onto proper demo releases. A selection of the more influential releases are listed here:

Demo Release History
Year	Demo	Comments
September 1987	Little Sound Demo	Mostly music with some colour scrolling
January 1988	The B.I.G. Demo	113 Tunes, 5 screens
March 1988	The Amiga Demo	An early example of border busting
January 1989	The Union Demo	In collaboration with TNT Crew, The CareBears, Level 16, the Replicants and the Delta Force

== Members ==
Like most demo groups the members used handles or nicknames to identify themselves.

- Mad Max a.k.a. Jochen Hippel (musician).
- Daryl a.k.a. Michael Raasch (coder).
- ES a.k.a. Erik Simon (graphican).
- 6719 a.k.a. Gunter Bitz (coder). His nickname is based on the citycode of his hometown.
- -ME- a.k.a. Udo Fischer (coder).
