= 5th Gear (video game) =

1988 video game

- Commodore 64 cover art
- Developer: Fantastic Four
- Publisher: Hewson Consultants
- Designer: Jeroen Leijten
- Composers: Jochen Hippel (ST, Amiga)
- Platforms: Amiga, Atari ST, Commodore 64
- Release: Amiga: NA: 1990; Atari ST: NA: 1989; Commodore 64: NA: 1988; EU: 1990
- Genre: Driving game
- Mode: Single-player

5th Gear is a computer game for the Amiga, Atari ST and Commodore 64, released on the Rack-It budget label. The original Commodore 64 version was programmed by Jeroen Leijten, with music by Theo and Renier Hongens. It was largely inspired by previous arcade games Steer and Go and Spy Hunter.

== Gameplay ==
The player controls a white car that travels up (and then down) a tricky landscape filled with water, bumps, trees, and enemy vehicles. Cash is earned by completing levels, with an initial $10,000 available. These funds are spent at garages to buy extra fuel, repair the car's armour, and put add-ons for the car. These include a turbo-jump (allowing the car to get airborne unassisted, rather than relying on jumps) and waterproofing.
