= New Computer Express =

British computer magazine

- Issue 126 cover
- Editor: Chris Anderson
- Frequency: Weekly
- Publisher: Future Publishing
- Founded: 1988
- First issue: November 1988
- Final issue: 1991
- Country: United Kingdom
- Language: English
- OCLC: 863285049

New Computer Express was a weekly magazine published by Future Publishing in the UK from 1988 to 1991.

== History and profile ==
New Computer Express was started in 1988. The first issue appeared in November 1988. The launch editor was Chris Anderson. During this time 8-bit micros were still prevalent, and 16-bit micros were growing their share of the market. The PC had yet to cement its hold on the home market and as a result it was a varied landscape. NCE was a multi-format magazine which tried to cover developments in the whole area. For example, in December 1989 it had articles covering the Amiga, Atari ST, PC, Amstrad CPC, BBC Micro, Acorn Archimedes, Commodore 64, MSX, Atari XE, Amstrad PCW, ZX Spectrum, and Sinclair QL. The magazine ceased publication in 1991.
