= Atari ST User =

British computer magazine

- Cover of March 1988 issue
- Editor: John Butters
- Categories: Computer magazine
- Frequency: Monthly
- Circulation: 33,706 (July–December 1988)
- First issue: March 1986
- Final issue: November 1994
- Company: Database Publications Ltd. (a subdivision of Europress)
- Country: United Kingdom
- Based in: London
- Language: English
- ISSN: 0952-3006

Atari ST User is a discontinued British computer magazine aimed at users of the Atari ST range. It started as a pull-out section in Atari User magazine. From April 1987 onwards it became a magazine in its own right (as explained on page 5), outlasting its parent by a number of years. It was published initially by Database Publications in Stockport, and later by Europress in London.

Although ST User did review games and carry demos, far more of the magazine was concerned with 'serious' issues such as hardware, programming, and music than its rivals ST Action and ST Format.

The Cover Disk that was supplied with issue 59, cover dated January 1991 had a boot sector computer virus which infected the memory of the Atari ST and was written to other disks that were not write-protected. Issue 60 had a free games cover disk as an apology, and was supplied with a virus killer. Source is http://www.atarimania.com/mags/hi_res/atari-st-user-issue-059_5.jpg

Towards the end of its print run, ST User merged with the game-oriented magazine ST Action, and publication finally ceased in November 1994, leaving ST Format as the only surviving Atari ST publication that was still widely available.
