= Games-X =

Defunct computer and video games magazine 1991-1992

- Cover of issue 3
- Editor: Hugh Gollner
- Categories: Computer and video games
- Frequency: Weekly
- Publisher: Europress
- First issue: 3 May 1991
- Final issue: April 1992
- Country: United Kingdom
- Language: English

Games-X was a multi-format weekly computer and video game magazine published in the United Kingdom. It was launched in May 1991. The publisher was Europress. Editor Hugh Gollner later described it "a big mistake" in terms of finances.

== See also ==
- Maverick Magazines
