= ACE (magazine) =

Computer and video game magazine

- ACE magazine, issue 1, October 1987
- Editor: Peter Connor & Steve Cooke (co-editors)
- Categories: Video game journalism
- Frequency: Monthly
- Circulation: 48,170 (circa April 1991)
- First issue: October 1987
- Final issue Number: April 1992; 55
- Company: Future plc 1987 to 1989; EMAP 1989 to 1992
- Country: United Kingdom
- Based in: Bath
- Language: English
- ISSN: 0954-8076

ACE (Advanced Computer Entertainment) is a discontinued multi-format computer and video game magazine, first published in the United Kingdom by Future Publishing and later acquired by EMAP.

== History ==
ACE launched in October 1987, roughly the same time as Ludlow-based publisher Newsfield's own multi-format magazine The Games Machine.

The magazine staff consisted mainly of ex-Amstrad Action (AA) and Personal Computer Games staff, including launch co-editors Peter Connor and Steve Cooke. Andy Wilton, ex-AA, was brought in as Reviews Editor, while Dave Packer and Andy Smith were hired as Staff Writers. Trevor Gilham, another ex-AA member, held the position of Art Editor.

Between June and July 1989 (issues 21 and 22) the magazine was sold to EMAP, and Future Publishing redeployed the original ACE staff to work on their Amiga Format and ST Format titles. After the magazine was cancelled in April 1992, a number of the staff working on ACE at the time were moved to The One (for Amiga Games) to relaunch the latter magazine.

== Content ==
Coverage initially included Atari ST, Amiga, C64, ZX Spectrum and Amstrad CPC, but also included newer machines as they were released. Although games features were the mainstay, other articles on graphics and computer music were featured. A cover cassette, and later a floppy disk, was included with the magazine featuring games demos.

Regular editorial features included Interface; News, Letters, The Blitter End. The Specials; features and Gameplay; Screen Test, Arcades, Tricks 'n' Tactics, Adventures.

=== Screen Test ===
Screen Test was the games review section. Games were rated (out of ten) on Visual effects, Audio, IQ Factor, Fun Factor and an overall rating. Games were seen by all the reviewers, and the overall rating was notable for scoring games out of 1000 rather than the usual percentage or mark out of 10. Also introduced was the Predicted Interest Curve graph where the game was given a line graph predicting the long term interest in the game over many months.

== See also ==
- Video game journalism
- Video game industry
