= The One (magazine) =

British video game magazine

- March 1989 issue
- Editor: Gary Penn (Oct 88-Feb 91); Ciarán Brennan (Mar 91-Feb 92); Heather Turley, Paul Presley & Jools Watsham (Apr 92); Jim Douglas (May 92-Aug 92); David Upchurch (Sep 92-Mar 94); Simon Byron (Apr 94-Nov 94); Andy Nuttall (Dec 94-July 95); Toby Gunton (Nov 95-July 96)
- Categories: Video game journalism
- Frequency: Monthly
- Publisher: EMAP
- First issue: October 1988
- Final issue Number: August 1996; 95
- Country: United Kingdom
- Based in: Peterborough
- Language: English
- ISSN: 0955-4084

The One is a discontinued video game magazine in the United Kingdom which covers 16-bit home gaming during the late 1980s and early 1990s. It was first published by EMAP in October 1988 and started with computer games for the Atari ST, Amiga, and IBM PC compatible markets.

Like many similar magazines, it contains sections of news, game reviews, previews, tips, help guides, columnist writings, readers' letters, and cover-mounted disks of game demos.

The magazine was sometimes criticised for including "filler" content such as articles on Arnold Schwarzenegger with the justification that an upcoming film had a computer game tie-in.

== History ==
In 1988 the 16-bit computer scene was beginning to emerge. With Commodore's Amiga and Atari's ST starting to gain more and more coverage in the multi format titles, EMAP decided it was time for a dedicated magazine aimed at the user of these 16-bit computers. The One for 16-Bit Games was launched and covered the Atari ST, Amiga, and PC games market. Produced by editor Gary Penn and a small team of contributors, the magazine went on to gain a circulation figures of over 40,000 readers.

The industry voted The One for 16-Bit Games "Magazine of the Year" in February 1990.

In June 1990, the magazine was extensively redesigned. Some regular features were dropped, the layout was changed, and the logo changed slightly to more emphasize ONE. The magazine was subtitled "For Amiga, Atari ST and PC Games".

=== Splits and reorganisation ===
The ST and Amiga had reached a larger market by 1991 and there were several single format magazines catering to these users. Because of this EMAP, along with recently appointed editor Ciarán Brennan, made the decision to split the magazine into The One for Amiga Games starting May 1991 and The One for ST Games. PC games coverage was transferred to the recently launched PC Leisure.

Because many features fell into the general computing category, content remained similar between the two magazines. Because both magazines were produced by the same production team, the magazines resembled one another. However a few months later both titles would move in their own directions, catering for platform specific games.

In 1992 EMAP was reorganizing their games magazines. Mean Machines was split into two, The One for ST Games was incorporated into Europress's ST Action, and ACE magazine closed. ACE magazine closing meant that there was a well-respected team available. To give The One a new direction and look, the original staff were moved on (speculation suggests they were moved to assist with the launch of ST Review magazine) and the ACE writers took their place. The change of The One was evident with magazines' relaunch. The new editor Jim Douglas and his team produced the new magazine from May 1992, with its shortened logo THE ONE, with the subtitle "Incorporating all the best of ACE". As the subtitle suggested, the magazine layout and content was essentially The One with some of the content of ACE, together producing an entirely new magazine.

Just months after the redesign, most of the staff moved on and David Upchurch took over editorship. Again, the magazine put the word "Amiga" in its title starting October 1992. Now called The One Amiga, this would allow potential readers to recognise the magazine as an Amiga title. The staples were also replaced in favour of a spine bound magazine.

There were many significant changes to the Amiga market in 1993. More coverage was given to games that were A1200 specific and there was the launch of the 32-bit Amiga CD32. All formats were accommodated within the magazine by way of the details box which indicated what specification the game was designed for.

In March 1994, David Upchurch announced his departure in that issue, ostensibly to assist with the launch of PC Games. Deputy Editor, Simon Byron, stepped up to replace him. Just eight issues later and the cycle repeated itself, Simon Byron left, and Deputy Editor, Andy Nuttall replaced him. Despite the new editorship and optimism the magazine page count decreased to 84 - partially as a result of Commodore going into liquidation, making the Amiga market uncertain of what would happen next.

In July 1995 it was announced that EMAP was closing the magazine down. The One content was incorporated into EMAP's other Amiga title, CU Amiga, beginning in the August 1995 edition of the latter.

This was not the end of the original The One magazine however, as Maverick Magazines bought the title and launched their first edition in August 1995. This version, dubbed The One Amiga: Maverick Edition, had a different content. It looked like The One but it lacked the former writing style and spirit of the EMAP team. Beginning in early 1996, the magazine quickly decreased to a pamphlet style magazine of just 16 pages - mostly dedicated to the full game included on the coverdisk - before ending with the final issue of August 1996. Unlike previously, this time around no mention was made of the fact that the magazine was ceasing publication.
