= ST Format =

British computer magazine

- Issue 1, August 1989
- Editor: Nick Peers
- Categories: Atari ST, Video games
- Frequency: Monthly
- First issue: August 1989
- Final issue Number: September 1996; 86
- Company: Future plc
- Country: United Kingdom
- Based in: Bath
- Language: English
- ISSN: 0957-4859

ST Format was a computer magazine in the UK covering the Atari ST during the late 1980s and early 1990s. Like other members of the Future plc Format stable - PC Format and Amiga Format, for instance, it combined software and hardware reviews with columnists, letters pages and a cover disk.

== History ==
The magazine was launched in 1989 when its predecessor, the short-lived ST/Amiga Format was split into two separate publications. Most of the staff went on to work at ST Format with Amiga Format essentially being a whole new magazine.

Later on, the magazine was kept alive by enthusiastic freelancers such as Frank Charlton and Andy Curtis, as well as dedicated staff writers and editors such as Clive Parker and Nick Peers.

ST Format continued publication until 1996, when production of the Atari ST and Atari Falcon computers was all but over. The final issue was published in September 1996, and was the eighty-sixth issue of the magazine. Fan sites for the magazine still exist on the internet, some featuring archives of features from the magazines.

The magazine encouraged backing up, or duplicating, the disk, which was formatted with 10 sectors per track instead of 9, to include more content on the disk. To facilitate the process a backup program was included on the disk in later issues, before then users were advised to back up the directories individually.
