= Amiga Format =

British computer magazine

- The cover of the final issue of Amiga Format (May 2000)
- Former editors: Editors Bob Wade; Damien Noonan; Marcus Dyson (1993–1994); Steve Jarratt; Nick Veitch; Ben Vost
- Categories: Amiga, Video games
- Frequency: Monthly
- Circulation: 161,256 (Jan – Jun 1992)
- First issue: August 1989
- Final issue Number: May 2000; 136
- Company: Future Publishing
- Country: United Kingdom
- Based in: Bath
- Language: English
- ISSN: 0957-4867

Amiga Format was a British monthly computer magazine for Amiga computers, published by Future Publishing. The magazine lasted 136 issues from 1989 to 2000. The magazine was formed when Future split ST/Amiga Format into two separate publications (the other being ST Format).

== Overview ==
The magazine's coverage extended to hardware, software, as well as video games. It is known to have provided each issue with a cover disk containing an assortment of demos and usually free-of-charge software and games, popularising the concept among its rival magazines. At its peak, in the first half of 1992, the magazine's circulation averaged 161,256 copies per issue.

The magazine would encourage the user to back up, in other words, duplicate the magazine cover disks in case there was a problem with the master disk later on, for example, disk errors. The magazine cover disk is bootable and loaded exactly like commercial software on the Amiga, although there were some disks that required the user to load Workbench to access them or a specific program.

== History ==
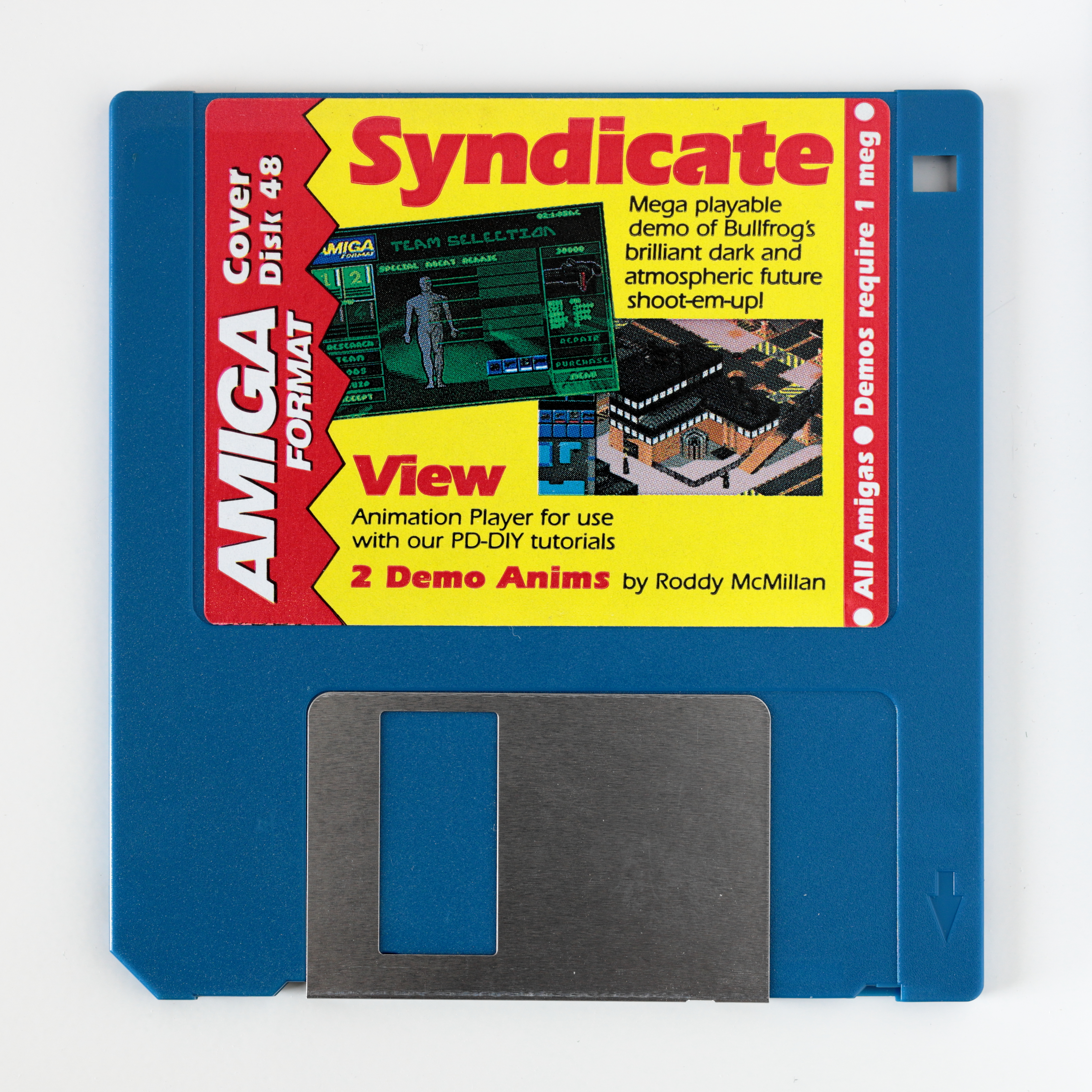
A cover disk featuring game and animation demos

ST/Amiga Format was a monthly magazine that covered the Amiga and Atari ST operating systems, created and published in July 1988 by Future Publishing founder Chris Anderson. The two operating systems were seen as rivals, and because of growing competition between them, in the wake of Future's sale of the video game magazine ACE to EMAP, it was decided to split the magazine into Amiga Format and ST Format in July 1989. As a result, the former dual-format title lasted only 13 issues, and the first issue of Amiga Format was published in August that year.

Amiga Format covered all aspects of Amiga computers, both hardware and software, both application and gaming uses. Future decided to spin off the magazine after reader demands for magazines with narrowed interests. Two magazines resulted: Amiga Shopper, which dealt purely with the hardware and "serious" software side of the Amiga scene, and Amiga Power, which was strictly games-only, and both were launched in May 1991.

The magazine was published monthly and offered various multi-issue tutorials on different application software, such as C programming or LightWave graphics rendering. The last tutorial was cut short in the middle because of the cancellation of the magazine. The magazine also regularly featured comic strips of the webcomic Sabrina Online, which was about the an anthropomorphic skunk woman named Sabrina whose interests included technology like the Amiga computers.

Each issue of Amiga Format was provided with a cover disk containing an assortment of application software, public-domain (i.e. free of charge) games, and new game demos—a practice pioneered by Future Publishing and which it inherited from its predecessor, ST/Amiga Format—popularising the concept amongst its rival magazines. Most of the programs distributed on the disks were public-domain software, shareware, or demos, often available through other means such as modems and bulletin board systems, but they occasionally included full-price commercial titles. Three such examples were the full versions of the games Archipelagos and Vaxine and the word processor Wordworth for the July 1991 issue. This practice drew ire from software publishers, and Amiga Format and its competitors agreed to halt it. In another example, a version of Blitz BASIC was mounted to the November 1993 cover disk, along with a zombie apocalypse game written in that language. Blitz BASIC subsequently overtook AMOS as the preferred way to program games. Later in its lifetime, the magazine turned to the CD as a medium for storing vast quantities of software, which benefited users who lacked Internet access. With its January 1997 issue, it became the United Kingdom's first computer magazine to attach two cover CDs to a single issue, the second for Amiga Advanced Graphics Architecture users.

During Marcus Dyson's time at Amiga Format as editor (1993–1994), a competition was run to find the best game developed by a reader using Blitz BASIC. A game called Total Wormage was entered by Andy Davidson. Although Total Wormage was overlooked by the magazine's judges and thus did not win, Marcus Dyson, who was editor when the magazine held the competition and had departed publishing to join developer Team17, persuaded Amiga Format to transfer rights to the game to the studio (all demos submitted to the competition became property of Future Publishing). Team17 would complete the game and release it commercially as Worms.

Circulation of Amiga Format (blue line with circles) compared with other Amiga magazines. At its peak, in the first half of 1992, the magazine averaged 161,256 copies per issue.

Amiga Format spanned 136 issues in its lifetime, achieving peak circulation at an average of 161,256 copies distributed in the first half of 1992, with the final issue published in May 2000. At the time of CU Amiga Magazine's closure in late 1998, it was the only regularly issued print magazine about the Amiga in the United Kingdom.

In November 2025, issue 40 of Amiga Addict was published both as a tribute to Amiga Format, and as issue 137 of Amiga Format itself, including an optional coverdisk containing X-Copy Professional; with copies available from some UK newsagents.

== Staff ==
Marcus Dyson, whom the magazine hired in 1990 as an art assistant, became editor in 1993 before departing the magazine the following year for Team17. Another writer to become editor was prolific Steve Jarratt. Contributors included Nick Walkland, previously a staff writer for the adventure games magazine Confidential and later part of the television programme Games World, and Richard Burton and David Crookes, both of whom who would later write for Retro Gamer. Other writers included Andy Nuttall and James Leach, both of whom also wrote for other video game magazines before entering Bullfrog Productions.
