= Amiga Action =

Computer science magazine

- September 1993 cover
- Categories: Video game magazines
- Frequency: Monthly
- First issue: October 1989
- Final issue Number: December 1996; 89
- Company: Europress / IDG Media
- Country: United Kingdom
- Based in: Chichester
- Language: English
- ISSN: 0957-4050
- OCLC: 499972962

Amiga Action was a monthly magazine about Amiga video games. It was published in the United Kingdom by Europress (later IDG Media) and ran for 89 full issues, from October 1989 to December 1996. After its closure, it was merged into sister publication Amiga Computing, replacing its games section. This ran for 10 issues until September 1997 when that magazine also folded.
