= Aktueller Software Markt =

German video game magazine

- June 1988 cover
- Editor: Manfred Kleimann; Peter Schmitz
- Managing Director: Axel Grede
- Categories: Video games
- Publisher: Tronic-Verlag
- First issue: March 1986
- Final issue: February 1995
- Country: Germany
- Language: German
- ISSN: 0933-1867
- OCLC: 724287306

Aktueller Software Markt (literally Current Software Market), commonly known by its acronym, ASM, was a German multi-platform video game magazine. It was published by Tronic-Verlag from 1986 until 1995. It was one of the first magazines published in Germany focused on video games, though the first issues of ASM covered the software market in general for almost all platforms at this time, hence the magazine's full name. According to the magazine itself, it was the first computer software journal in Germany. However, it soon evolved into a video game magazine.

== History ==
The first issue was published in March 1986, issue 2/1995 was the last issue. From the first issue until ASM 9/1991, Manfred Kleimann was the magazine's chief editor, then he was replaced by Matthias Siegk. With issue 5/1993, Peter Schmitz took the place of the chief editor until the last ASM.

During the last years of the ASM's history, the name was changed two times. With issue 12/1993, the magazine was renamed ASM – Das Spaß-Magazin, meaning "ASM – The Fun Magazine". Another name change occurred with issue 11/1994, now the magazine's full name was ASM – Das Computer-Spaß-Magazin, literally "ASM – The Computer Fun Magazine", which was used until the last issue.
