= List of Amiga games (A–H) =

This is a list of games for the Commodore Amiga computer system, organised alphabetically by name. See Lists of video games for related lists.

== 0–9 ==
- 007: Licence to Kill
- 1 across 2 down
- 1000 Miglia
- 1869
- 1943: The Battle of Midway
- 1st Division Manager
- 1st Personal Pinball
- 3001: O'Connors Fight
- 3D Construction Kit
- 3D Construction Kit II
- 3D Galax
- 3D Pool
- 3D Soccer
- 3D World Boxing
- 3D World Tennis
- 4 Soccer Simulations
- 4 Wheel Drive
- 4-Get-It
- 4D Sports Boxing
- 4th & Inches
- 4x4 Off-Road Racing
- 50 Great Games
- 500 C.C MotoManager
- 5th Gear
- 688 Attack Sub
- 7 Colors
- 7 Tiles
- 9 Lives
- 944 Turbo Cup

== A ==
- A-10 Tank Killer
- A320 Airbus
- A.G.E.
- A.P.B.
- Aaargh!
- A Mind Forever Voyaging
- A Prehistoric Tale
- ABC Monday Night Football
- ABC Wide World of Sports Boxing
- Abandoned Places
- Abandoned Places 2
- Abuse
- Academy: Tau Ceti II
- Act of War
- Action Cat
- Action Fighter
- Action Service
- Action Stations!
- Addams Family, The
- Advanced Destroyer Simulator
- Advanced Dungeons & Dragons: Heroes of the Lance
- Advantage Tennis
- Adventure Construction Set
- Adventures of Robin Hood, The
- Adventures of Willy Beamish, The
- African Raiders
- After the War
- After Burner
- After Burner II
- Agony
- Air Bucks
- Air Force Commander
- Air Supply
- Air Support
- Airstrike USA
- Air Warrior
- Airball
- Airborne Ranger
- AirTaxi
- Akira
- Aladdin's Magic Lamp
- Alfred Chicken
- Ali Baba
- Alienator
- Alien³
- Alien Bash 2
- Alien Breed
- Alien Breed II: The Horror Continues
- Alien Breed: Tower Assault
- Alien Breed 3D
- Alien Breed 3D II: The Killing Grounds
- Alien Fires 2199 AD
- Alien Legion
- Alien Storm
- Alien Syndrome
- Alien World
- All Dogs Go to Heaven
- All New World of Lemmings
- All Quiet on the Library Front
- All Terrain Racing
- Alpha Waves
- Altered Beast
- Altered Destiny
- Alternate Reality
- Amazing Spider-Man, The
- Ambermoon
- Amberstar
- Amegas
- American Gladiators
- American Tag-Team Wrestling
- Amiga CD Football
- Amiga Karate
- Amnios
- Anarchy
- Ancient Art of War in the Skies
- Ancient Battles
- Ancient Domains of Mystery
- Andromeda Mission
- Annals of Rome
- Another World
- Antago
- Antares
- Antheads: It Came from the Desert II
- Apache
- Apache Flight
- Apano Sin
- Apidya
- Apocalypse
- Apprentice
- Aquanaut
- Aquaventura
- Arabian Nights
- Arachnophobia
- Arcade ClassiX
- Arcade Fruit Machine
- Arcade Pool
- Arcade Volleyball
- Archer Maclean's Pool
- Archipelagos
- Archon: The Light and the Dark
- Archon II: Adept
- Arcticfox
- Arena 2000
- Arkanoid
- Arkanoid: Revenge of Doh
- Armada
- Armalyte
- Armour-Geddon
- Armour-Geddon 2: Codename Hellfire
- Army Moves
- Arnhem: The Market Garden Operation
- Arnie
- Arnie II
- Arthur: The Quest for Excalibur
- Artura
- Arya Vaiv
- Ashes of Empire
- Assassin
- Astaroth
- Astate
- A.M.C.: Astro Marine Corps
- Atax
- ATF II
- Atomino
- Atomix
- A-Train
- Aufschwung Ost
- Aunt Arctic Adventure
- Austerlitz
- Australopiticus Mechanicus
- Autoduel
- AV-8B Harrier Assault
- Awesome
- Axel's Magic Hammer

== B ==
- B.A.T.
- B.A.T. II – The Koshan Conspiracy
- B-17 Flying Fortress
- Baal
- Baby Joe
- Babylonian Twins
- Back to the Future Part II
- Back to the Future Part III
- Backlash
- Bad Company
- Bad Dudes Vs. DragonNinja
- Badlands Pete
- Balance of Power
- Balances
- Balkanski Konflikt
- Ballistic Diplomacy
- Ballistix
- Bally
- Bally II
- Bally III
- Ballyhoo
- Bandit Kings of Ancient China
- Bangboo
- Bangkok Knights
- Bank Busters
- Banshee
- Bar Games
- Barbarian: The Ultimate Warrior
- Barbarian II: The Dungeon of Drax
- Bard's Tale, The
- Bard's Tale 2, The
- Bard's Tale 3, The
- Bargon Attack
- Barney Mouse
- Baron Baldric: A Grave Adventure
- Base Jumpers
- Batman
- Batman Returns
- Batman: The Caped Crusader
- Battle Chess
- Battle Command
- Battle Isle
- Battle Isle Data Disk I
- Battle Isle '93: The Moon of Chromos
- Battle Isle: Battle Field Creator
- Battle Master
- Battle Squadron
- Battle Valley
- Battlehawks 1942
- Battleships
- Battlestorm
- BattleTech: The Crescent Hawk's Inception
- Battletoads
- Bazza'n'Runt
- Bonk's Adventure
- Beach Volley
- Beam
- Beastlord
- Beavers
- Behind the Iron Gate
- Belial
- Beneath a Steel Sky
- Benefactor
- Benny Beetle
- Betrayal
- Better Dead Than Alien
- Beyond Dark Castle
- Beyond the Ice Palace
- Beyond Zork
- Bi-Fi Roll: Action in Hollywood
- Bi-Fi Roll: Snackzone
- Big Business
- Big Run
- Big Red Adventure, The
- Big Sea
- Big Nose the Caveman
- Biing
- Bill & Ted's Excellent Adventure
- Bill's Tomato Game
- Bio Challenge
- Bionic Commando
- Birds of Prey
- Bismarck
- Black Cauldron, The
- Black Crypt
- Black Gold (1989) (by reLINE Software)
- Black Gold (1992) (by Starbyte Software)
- Black Lamp
- Black Magic
- Black Tiger
- Black Viper
- Blade
- Blade Warrior
- Blasteroids
- Blinky's Scary School
- Blitzbombers
- Blitzkrieg
- Blob
- Blobz
- Blockout
- Blood Money
- Blood Wars
- BloodNet
- Bloodwych
- Blue and the Gray
- Blue Angel 69
- Blues Brothers, The
- Blue Brothers 2, The
- BMX Simulator
- Bob's Bad Day
- Bob's Garden
- Body Blows
- Body Blows Galactic
- Bograts
- Bomb Jack
- Bomb Jack 2
- Bomb Mania
- Bomber Bob
- Bombfusion
- Bombuzal
- Bonanza Bros.
- Bonecruncher
- Boooly
- Boppin'
- Border Zone
- Borrowed Time
- Borobodur
- Borodino
- Börsenfieber
- Boulder Dash
- Bouncing Bill
- Brain Box
- Brain Killer
- Bram Stoker's Dracula
- Brat
- Brataccas
- Bravo Romeo Delta
- Breach 1
- Breach 2
- Breathless
- Breed 2000
- Breed 96
- Brian the Lion
- Bride of the Robot
- BrickFast
- Brides of Dracula
- Brigade Commander
- Brutal: Paws of Fury
- Brutal Sports Football
- BSS Jane Seymour
- Bubba 'n' Stix
- Bubble and Squeak
- Bubble Bobble
- Bubble Dizzy
- Bubble Heroes
- Buck Rogers: Countdown to Doomsday
- Buck Rogers: Matrix Cubed
- Bucktooth Bob's Jungle Adventure
- Budokan: The Martial Spirit
- Bug Bash
- Bug Bomber
- Buggy Boy
- Build It
- Builderland
- Bump'n'Burn
- Bumpy's Arcade Fantasy
- Bureaucracy
- Burger Man
- Burning Rubber
- Burnout
- Burntime
- Burntime AGA
- Buster Bros.
- Buzalogamitic wrecking ball
- By Fair Means or Foul

== C ==
- Cabaret Asteroids
- Cadaver
- Caesar
- California Games
- Campaign
- Cannon Fodder
- Cannon Fodder 2
- Capital Punishment
- Capone
- Captain Blood
- Captain Dynamo
- Captain Fizz
- Captain Planet and the Planeteers
- Captive
- Cardiaxx
- Cardinal of the Kremlin, The
- Carnage
- Carrier Command
- Carthage
- Cartoons, The
- CarVup
- Cash
- Castle Incinerator
- Castle Kingdoms
- Castle Master
- Castle of Dr. Brain
- Castle Warrior
- Castles
- Castles 2
- Castlevania
- Catch 'em
- Cattivic
- Cave Story
- Caveman Species
- Cedric
- Cells: Game of Life
- Celtic Legends
- Centerbase
- Centurion: Defender of Rome
- Century
- Chambers of Shaolin
- Champion Driver
- Champion of the Raj
- Champions of Krynn
- Championship Baseball
- Championship Manager
- Championship Manager 93/94
- Championship Run
- Chaos Engine, The
- Chaos Engine 2, The
- Chaos Strikes Back
- Chariots of Wrath
- Charr
- Chartbreaker
- Chase
- Chase H.Q.
- Chess Champion 2175
- Chess Player 2150
- Chess Simulator
- Chicago 90
- Chinese Karate
- Chip's Challenge
- Christminster
- Chrono Quest
- Chrono Quest II
- Chubby Gristle
- Chuck Rock
- Chuck Rock II: Son of Chuck
- Chuckie Egg
- Chuckie Egg 2
- Circuit Wars
- Cisco Heat
- Citadel / Cytadela
- City Defence
- Civilization
- CJ in the USA
- CJ's Elephant Antics
- Clever & Smart
- Cliffhanger
- Clik Clak
- Clockwiser
- Cloud Kingdoms
- Clown'o'Mania
- Cluedo
- Clystron
- Coala
- Codename Hell Squad
- Codename: ICEMAN
- Cognition
- Cohort
- Cohort 2
- Colonel's Bequest, The
- Colonial Conquest 2
- Colony, The
- Colorado
- Coloris
- Combat Air Patrol
- Combo Racer
- Commando
- Computer Diplomacy
- Conflict: Europe
- Conflict: Korea
- Conflict: Middle East Political Simulator
- Conqueror
- Conquests of Camelot: The Search for the Grail
- Conquests of the Longbow: The Legend of Robin Hood
- Conquistador
- Continental Circus
- Cool Croc Twins
- Cool Spot
- Cool World
- Corporation
- Corruption
- Corsarios
- Cortex
- Corx
- Cosmic Bouncer
- Cosmic Pirate
- Cosmic Spacehead
- Cougar Force
- Count and Add
- Count Duckula
- Count Duckula II
- Cover Girl Strip Poker
- Covert Action
- Crack Down
- Craps Academy
- Crash Garrett
- Crash Landing
- Crazy Cars
- Crazy Cars 2
- Crazy Cones
- Crazy Seasons
- Crazy Sue
- Crazy Sue Goes On
- Creature
- Creatures
- Creepers
- Creepy
- Cricket
- Cricket Captain
- Crime City
- Crossfire 2
- Crown
- Crown of Ardania
- Cruise for a Corpse
- Crystal Dragon
- Crystal Hammer
- Crystal Kingdom Dizzy
- Crystal Palace
- Crystals of Arborea
- Cube
- Cubit
- Cubulus
- Curse of Enchantia
- Curse of Ra
- Curse of the Azure Bonds
- Custodian
- Cutthroats
- Cyber Assault
- Cyber Empires
- Cyber Force
- Cyber Games
- Cyber Kick
- Cyber World
- Cyberball
- Cyberblast
- Cybercon III
- Cybernauts
- Cybernoid
- Cybernoid 2
- Cyberpunks
- Cybersphere
- Cyberzerk
- Cybexion
- Cycles
- Cygnus 8
- Cytron

== D ==
- D-Day
- D-Day: The Beginning of the End
- D.R.A.G.O.N. Force
- D/Generation
- Daily Double Horse Racing
- Dalek Attack
- Daley Thompsons Olympic Challenge
- Damocles
- Dan Dare 3
- Danger Castle
- Danger Freak
- Dangerous Streets
- Dark Castle
- Dark Century
- Dark Fusion
- Dark Queen of Krynn, The
- Dark Seed
- Dark Side
- Dark Spyre
- Darkman
- Darkmere
- Das Boot
- Das Deutsche Imperium
- Das Dschungelbuch
- Das Haus
- Das Magazin
- Datastorm
- Dawn Patrol
- Day of the Pharaoh
- Day of the Viper
- Daylight Robbery
- Days of Thunder
- Deadline
- Death Bringer
- Death Knights of Krynn
- Death Mask
- Death or Glory
- Death Trap
- Deathbots
- Deathbringer
- Deep Core
- Deep Space
- Deep, The
- Def Con 5
- Defender 2
- Defender of the Crown
- Defender of the Crown II
- Defenders of the Earth
- Deflektor
- Deja Vu
- Deja Vu II: Lost in Las Vegas
- Deliverance: Stormlord II
- Delivery Agent
- Deluxe Galaga
- Deluxe Monopoly
- Deluxe Strip Poker
- Demolition
- Demon Blue
- Demon Wars
- Demon's Winter
- Demoniak
- Denaris
- Dennis the Menace
- Der Patrizier
- Der Produzent
- Der Reeder
- Der Seelenturm
- Descent: FreeSpace – The Great War
- Desert Racing of BarDos
- Desert Strike: Return to the Gulf
- Designasaurus
- Detroit AGA
- Deuteros
- Devious Designs
- Diablo
- Dick Tracy
- Die Drachen von Laas
- Die Nordländer
- Die unendliche Geschichte 2
- Diggers
- Dimo's Quest
- Dingsda
- Dino Dini's Goal
- Dino Wars
- Dinosaur Detective Agency
- Disc
- Discovery
- Discovery: In the Steps of Columbus
- Diskman
- Disney's Aladdin
- Disposable Hero
- Distant Armies
- Dithell in Space
- Dive Bomber
- Dizzy Down the Rapids
- Dizzy Panic!
- Dizzy Prince of the Yolkfolk
- DNA Warrior
- Doc Croc's Adventure
- Dogfight
- Dogs of War
- Dojo Dan
- Domination
- Dominator
- Dominium
- Donald Duck's Playground
- Donald's Alphabet Chase
- Donk!
- Doodlebug
- Doofus
- Double Agent
- Double Dragon
- Double Dragon II: The Revenge
- Double Dragon 3: The Rosetta Stone
- Double Mind
- Down at the Trolls
- Downhill Challenge
- Dr. Doom's Revenge
- Dr. Plummet's House of Flux
- Dragon Breed
- Dragon Fighter
- Dragon Spirit
- Dragon Wars
- Dragon's Breath
- Dragon's Lair
- Dragon's Lair: Escape from Singe's Castle
- Dragon's Lair II: Time Warp
- Dragon's Lair III: The Curse of Mordread
- Dragonflight
- Dragons of Flame
- Dragonstone
- DragonStrike
- Drakkhen
- Dreadnoughts
- DreamWeb
- Dream Zone
- Driller
- Drip
- Drivin' Force
- Drop It
- Druid II: Enlightenment
- Drôle D'école
- DuckTales: The Quest for Gold
- Dune
- Dune II
- Dungeon Flipper
- Dungeon Master
- Dungeon Master II: The Legend of Skullkeep
- Dungeon Quest
- Dungeons of Avalon
- Dungeons of Avalon 2: Island of Darkness
- Dungeons, Amethysts, Alchemists 'n' Everythin'
- Dylan Dog
- Dyna Blaster
- Dynamite Düx
- Dynasty Wars
- Dynatech
- Dyter-07
- DX-Ball

== E ==
- E.S.S.: European Space Simulator
- Eagle's Rider
- Earl Weaver Baseball
- Earth 2140
- Ebonstar
- Eco
- Edd the Duck
- Edd the Duck 2
- Eggminator
- Elf
- Elfmania
- Eliminator
- Elite
- Elvira: The Arcade Game
- Elvira: Mistress of the Dark
- Elvira II: The Jaws of Cerberus
- Elysium
- Embryo
- Emlyn Hughes International Soccer
- Emmanuelle
- E-Motion
- Emperor of the Mines
- Empire
- Empire Soccer
- Empire: Wargame of the Century
- Enchanted Land
- Enchanter
- Encounter
- England Championship Special
- Enterprise
- Entity
- Epic
- Erik
- Escape from Colditz
- Escape from the Planet of the Robot Monsters
- Espionage
- ESWAT Cyber Police
- E.T.'s Rugby League
- Euro Soccer '88
- Euro Soccer '92
- European Championship 1992
- European Football Champ
- European Soccer Challenge
- Evil Garden
- Evil's Doom
- Evolution Cryser
- Exile
- Exodus 3010
- Exodus: The Last War
- Exolon
- Exploration
- Extase
- Exterminator
- Extreme Violence
- Eye of Horus
- Eye of the Beholder
- Eye of the Beholder 2
- Eye of the Storm
- Eyes of the Eagle

== F ==
- F.O.F.T.: Federation of Free Traders
- F1
- F/A-18 Interceptor
- F-117A Stealth Fighter 2.0
- F-15 Strike Eagle II
- F-16 Combat Pilot
- F-16 Falcon 1
- F-16 Falcon 2
- F17 Challenge
- F-19 Stealth Fighter
- F29 Retaliator
- FA Premier League
- Faery Tale Adventure, The
- Fah-Yo
- Falcon
- Fallen Angel
- Fantastic Adventures of Dizzy
- Fantastic Voyage
- Fantasy World Dizzy
- Fascination
- Fast Eddie's Pool
- Fast Food Dizzy
- Fate: Gates of Dawn
- Fatman
- Fears
- Feeble Files, The
- FernGully Computerized Coloring Book, The
- Ferrari Formula One
- Fields of Glory
- FIFA International Soccer
- Fighter Bomber
- Fighter Command
- Fighter Duel Pro 2
- Fightin' Spirit
- Fighting Soccer
- Fill 'em
- Final Battle, The
- Final Command
- Final Conflict, The
- Final Countdown
- Final Fight
- Final Mission, The
- Final Odyssey
- Fire
- Fire & Brimstone
- Fire and Ice
- Fire Brigade
- Fire Power
- Fire Zone
- Fireforce
- Fireteam 2200
- First Contact
- First Samurai
- Fish!
- Fist Fighter
- Flames of Freedom
- Flamingo Tours
- Flashback
- Flight of the Amazon Queen
- Flight of the Intruder
- Flight Simulator II
- Flimbo's Quest
- Flink
- Flip It & Magnose
- Flood
- Floor 13
- Fly Fighter
- Fly Harder
- Flying High
- Fool's Errand, The
- Football Champ
- Football Glory
- Football Glory Indoors
- Football Manager
- Football Manager 2
- Football Manager World Cup Edition
- Footballer of the Year
- Forest Dumb Forever
- Forgotten Worlds
- Formula One 3D
- Formula One Grand Prix
- Fort Apache
- Fortress Underground
- Foundation
- Foundation Director's Cut
- Foundation's Waste
- Frankenstein
- Franko: The Crazy Revenge
- Frenetic
- Fright Night
- Frontier: Elite II
- Fugger
- Full Contact
- Full Metal Planete
- Fullspeed
- Fun School 2
- Fun School 3
- Fun School 4
- Fun School Specials
- Funsoft Inc.
- Furball
- Fury of the Furries
- Future Space
- Future Sport
- Future Tank
- Future Wars
- Fuzzball
- Future Basketball

== G ==
- Gainforce
- Galactic
- Galactic Conqueror
- Galactic Empire
- Galactic Warrior Rats
- Galaga 89
- Galaga 92
- Galaxy 94
- Galaga Deluxe
- Galaxy Force
- Galaxy Force II
- The Games '92: España
- Garfield: Big Fat Hairy Deal
- Garfield: Winter's Tail
- Garrison
- Garrison 2
- Gateway to the Savage Frontier
- Gateway Y
- Gauntlet
- Gauntlet II
- Gauntlet III: The Final Quest
- Gazza Soccer 2
- Gazza's Superstar Soccer
- GBA Championship Basketball: Two-on-Two
- Gear Works
- Gee Bee Air Rally
- Geisha
- Gem Stone Legend
- Gemini Wing
- Gem'X
- Genesia
- Genetic Species
- Genghis Khan
- Genius
- Germ Crazy
- German Trucking
- Ghost Battle
- Ghostbusters II
- Ghosts 'n Goblins
- Ghouls'n Ghosts
- Giana's Return
- Gilbert: Escape from Drill
- Global Chaos
- Global Commander
- Global Effect
- Global Gladiators
- Globdule
- Globulus
- G-LOC: Air Battle
- Gloom
- Gloom 3
- Gnome Ranger
- Go
- Gobliiins
- Gobliins II: The Prince Buffoon
- Goblins Quest III
- Godfather, The
- Gods
- Gold of the Americas
- Golf of the Aztecs, The
- Gold of the Realm
- Gold Rush!
- Golden Axe
- Golden Eagle
- Golden Path, The
- Golden Wing
- Goldrunner
- Goldrunner 2
- Graeme Souness Vektor Soccer
- Graffiti Man
- Graham Gooch World Class Cricket
- Graham Taylor's Soccer Challenge
- Granny's Garden
- Grand Prix Circuit
- Gravity
- Grav Attack
- Gravity Force
- Great Courts
- Great Courts 2
- Great Giana Sisters, The
- Great Napoleonic Battles
- Gremlins 2: The New Batch
- Gridiron!
- Guardian
- Guardian Angel
- Guardians
- Guild of Thieves, The
- Gunbee F-99
- Gunship
- Gunship 2000
- Guy Spy and the Crystals of Armageddon

== H ==
- H.A.T.E.
- Hacker
- Hacker II: The Doomsday Papers
- Halley Project, The
- Halls of Montezuma
- Hammerfist
- Hannibal
- Hanse
- Hanse 2: Gold
- HardBall!
- Hard Drivin'
- Hard Drivin' 2: Drive Harder
- Hard Nova
- Hard'n'Heavy
- Hare Raising Havoc
- Harlequin
- Harpoon
- Hawkeye
- Head over Heels
- Heart of China
- Heart of the Dragon
- Heavy Metal
- Heavy Metal Heroes
- Heimdall
- Heimdall 2
- Hell Raiser
- Hell Squad
- Hell Run
- Hellfire Attack
- Henrietta's Book of Spells
- Heretic II
- Hex
- Hexuma
- High Seas Trader
- High Steel
- Highway Patrol 1
- Highway Patrol 2
- Hillsea Lido
- Hillsfar
- Hired Guns
- History Line 1914-1918
- Hitchhiker's Guide to the Galaxy, The
- Hoi
- Hole-in-One Miniature Golf
- Hollywood Hijinx
- Hollywood Pictures
- Home Alone
- Home Alone Computerized Coloring Book, The
- Hong Kong Phooey
- Hook
- Hooray for Henrietta
- Horror Zombies from the Crypt
- Hostages
- Hostile Breed
- Hot Ball
- Hot Rod
- HotShot
- Hound of Shadow, The
- Huckleberry Hound
- Hudson Hawk
- Hugo
- Human Killing Machine
- Humans, The
- Humans 2
- Humans 3
- Hunt the Fonts
- Hunter
- Hybris
- Hyperdome
