= List of PC games (Numerical) =

The following page is an alphabetical section from the list of PC games.

== Numerical ==
Title	Developer	Publisher	Genre(s)	Operating system(s)	Date released
_Summer	Hooksoft	Hook	Visual novel	Microsoft Windows	15 July 2005
0 A.D.	Wildfire Games	Wildfire Games	RTS	Microsoft Windows, Linux, macOS	16 August 2010
007 First Light	IO Interactive	IO Interactive	Action-adventure	Microsoft Windows	May 27, 2026
007 Legends	Eurocom	Activision	First-person shooter	Microsoft Windows	2 November 2012
007: Licence to Kill	Quixel	Domark	Top-down shooter	MS-DOS	20 April 1989
007: Quantum of Solace	Treyarch, Beenox	Activision, Square Enix	First-person shooter	Microsoft Windows	31 October 2008
1-0 Soccer Manager	New Era Software	Wizard Games	Sports, management	MS-DOS	1992
10 Second Ninja X	Four Circle Interactive	Curve Games	Puzzle-platform	Microsoft Windows	July 19, 2016
100ft Robot Golf	No Goblin	No Goblin	Sports	Microsoft Windows	March 16, 2017
1001 Spikes	8bits Fanatics; Nicalis	Nicalis	Platform	Microsoft Windows, OS X, Linux	June 3, 2014
101 Dalmatians: Escape from DeVil Manor	DreamForge Intertainment	Disney Interactive	Action, adventure, strategy	Microsoft Windows	1997
102 Dalmatians: Puppies to the Rescue	Crystal Dynamics	Disney Interactive	Platform	Microsoft Windows	2000
10th Frame	Access Software	US Gold	Sports	MS-DOS	1986
11-11: Memories Retold	DigixArt; Aardman Animations	Bandai Namco Entertainment	Adventure	Microsoft Windows	November 9, 2018
140	Jeppe Carlson		Platformer	Microsoft Windows, Linux, macOS	16 October 2013
18 Wheels of Steel: Haulin'	SCS Software	ValuSoft	Vehicle simulation	Microsoft Windows	8 December 2006
180	Ste Pickford, David Whittaker	Mastertronic Added Dimension	Sports	Commodore 64	1986
1830: Railroads & Robber Barons	Simtex	Avalon Hill	RTS	MS-DOS	1995
1869	Max Design	Max Design	Strategy	MS-DOS	1992
1914 Shells of Fury	Randomeida	Strategy First	Simulation	Microsoft Windows	14 August 2007
1942: The Pacific Air War	Microprose	Microprose	Flight simulator	MS-DOS	1994
1979 Revolution: Black Friday	iNK Stories	iNK Stories	Adventure; Interactive drama	Microsoft Windows, OS X	April 5, 2016
198X	Hi-Bit Studios	Sonka	Action	Microsoft Windows	June 20, 2019
221B Baker Street	Datasoft	Datasoft	Puzzle	MS-DOS	1987
2400 A.D.	Origin Systems	Origin Systems	Adventure	MS-DOS, Apple II	1987
2XKO	Riot Games	Riot Games	Fighting	Microsoft Windows	January 20, 2026
3-D Bomberman	Hudson Soft	Hudson Soft	Arcade, maze, strategy		1984
3-Demon	PC research INC		Adventure	MS-DOS	1983
3D Construction Kit	Incentive Software	Domark	Simulation	MS-DOS	1 July 1991
3D Construction Kit II	Incentive Software	Domark	Simulation	MS-DOS	10 November 1992
3D Maze Man: Amazing Adventures	Webfoot Technologies	eGames Inc	Arcade	MS-DOS	1998
3DiTeams	Duke University Medical Center, Virtual Heroes, Inc.	Duke University Medical Center, Virtual Heroes, Inc.	Serious game	Microsoft Windows	1 November 2007
3Kingdoms	Project Community		MUD		1992
4D Sports Boxing	Distinctive Software	Mindscape	Sports	Amiga, MS-DOS, Atari ST, macOS	15 June 1991
4D Sports Tennis	Distinctive Software	Mindscape	Sports	MS-DOS	1990
4 Elements	Playrix Entertainment		Adventure Game	Microsoft Windows	3 September 2008
4Story	Zemi Interactive	Gameforge	MMORPG	Microsoft Windows	2008
4th & Inches	Accolade		Sports, American football	Amiga, Commodore 64, Apple II, Apple IIGS, MS-DOS	1987
4x4 Hummer	Avalon Entertainment	505 Games, 1C Company	Racing	Microsoft Windows	15 June 2009
4x4 Off-Road Racing	Odan MicroDesign	Epyx	Racing	Amstrad CPC, Atari ST, Amiga, MS-DOS, Commodore 64, MSX, ZX Spectrum	1988
5	Ram	Visual Art's	Eroge, visual novel	Microsoft Windows	25 July 2008
5 A Day Adventures		Dole Food Company	Education	Microsoft Windows	1994
50 Mission Crush	John Gray	Strategic Simulations, Inc	RPG	Apple II, Atari 8-bit, Commodore 64, MS-DOS	1984
500cc Grand Prix	Microïds	Microïds	Racing	Amstrad CPC, Atari ST, Commodore C64/128	1987
688(I) Hunter/Killer	Sonalysts Inc.	Electronic Arts	Submarine simulator	Microsoft Windows	4 July 1997
7 Colors	Gamos Ltd.	Infogrames	Strategy	Amiga, MS-DOS	1991
7554	Emobi Games	Emobi Games	First-person shooter	Microsoft Windows	16 December 2011
7th Legion	Vision, Epic MegaGames	MicroProse	RTS	Microsoft Windows	30 September 1997
80 Days	Frogwares		Adventure	Microsoft Windows	2005
8BitMMO	Archive Entertainment		MMORPG	Microsoft Windows, Linux, macOS	14 December 2013
9: The Last Resort	Tribeca Interactive	GT Interactive	Adventure game	Microsoft Windows, macOS	30 September 1996
9 Monkeys of Shaolin	Sobaka Studio	Buka Entertainment; Ravenscourt	Beat 'em up	Microsoft Windows, Linux, macOS	October 16, 2020
911 Operator	Jutsu Games	PlayWay	Simulation	Microsoft Windows, Mac	February 24, 2017
