= Karyssia: Queen of Diamonds =

1987 video game

- Cover by Peter Carter
- Developer: Incentive Software
- Publisher: Incentive Software
- Designers: D&R Shacklady
- Engine: Graphic Adventure Creator
- Platform: ZX Spectrum
- Release: 1987
- Genre: Text adventure game
- Mode: Single-player

Karyssia: Queen of Diamonds is a fantasy-themed, text-based graphic adventure game designed and published by Incentive Software in 1987 for the ZX Spectrum. In Karyssia, the player is cast in a role of an adventurer on a quest to rid the realm of the titular evil queen. The game received positive reviews. It was developed using Graphic Adventure Creator (GAC), is a game creation system/programming language for adventure games created by the company.

== Plot ==
Loranin, the rightful heir to the throne of Arduarin, has asked the protagonist to end the evil reign of Queen Karyssia. This will involve a long journey to reach Karyssia's castle and kill her.

== Reception ==
ACE gave it an overall review score of 695/1000, calling it "certainly one of the better GAC games released by Incentive". Mike Gerrard of Your Sinclair wrote that "apart from a few careless screen layouts this is one of the best GAC games I've yet seen. The speech function is often limited to saying 'Hello' just to get a response from the characters, but I liked the way the authors seem to have successfully packed lots of features into the program. Highly recommended".

According to Popular Computing Weekly, apart from spell casting gameplay element, "the game is an average fantasy romp, OK, but not outstanding." On the other hand, a reviewer for Crash gave it an overall score of 87/100: "Karyssia is a fine adventure with many admirable features. The pretty 3-D graphics are thin on the ground, and the location descriptions aren't the most evocative I've read, but the plot, which unwinds along three separately loading parts, holds the attention marvelously".
