= Hell Squad =

Hell Squad may refer to:

- Hell Squad (1958 film), written and directed by Burt Topper
- Hell Squad (1985 film)
- Hell Squad for the Commodore Amiga
