= Warblade (disambiguation) =

Warblade is a computer game.

Warblade may also refer to:

- Warblade (comics), a Wildstorm character
- Warblade (Dungeons & Dragons), a character class in the roleplaying game
