= Confuzion =

1985 video game

- Developer: Incentive Software
- Publisher: Incentive Software
- Programmer: Paul Shirley
- Composer: Rob Hubbard
- Platforms: ZX Spectrum, Amstrad CPC, Commodore 64, BBC Micro, Acorn Electron
- Release: 1985
- Genre: Puzzle
- Mode: Single-player

Confuzion is a 1985 puzzle video game developed and published by Incentive Software for the ZX Spectrum, Commodore 64, BBC Micro, and Acorn Electron. The object is to guide a spark along a fuse wire. It is similar to the 1982 arcade game Loco-Motion. Confuzion was written by Paul Shirley who later wrote Spindizzy.

Zzap!64 magazine considered Confuzion to be the best arcade-puzzle game available at the time for the Commodore 64.

== Audio track ==
The cassette tape on which the game was supplied also contained an audio track also titled "Confusion", which was composed by the band Private Property (Matt Smith Lyrics, Joanne Holt/Steve Salt Music) and performed by Joanne Holt, Matt Smith, Steve Salt, Chris Weller and Gary Seaward. Rob Hubbard translated the original track into the game's soundtrack. Rob Hubbard's version of the music is mentioned in the book Bits and pieces: a history of chiptunes by Kenneth B. McAlpine.

The band persuaded Incentive Software to change their audio cassette duplication process from monophonic to stereophonic, so that the music could be better appreciated (mono was fine for the computer program data which was distributed on cassette tapes in the 80s).

The graphic design for the cover of the cassette was created by Matthew Tidbury.
