= Driller (video game) =

1987 video game

- Developer: Major Developments
- Publisher: Incentive Software
- Designers: Chris Andrew; Ian Andrew
- Engine: Freescape
- Platforms: Amiga, Amstrad CPC, Atari ST, Commodore 64, MS-DOS, ZX Spectrum
- Release: 1987
- Genre: Puzzle
- Mode: Single-player

Driller (known as Space Station Oblivion in the United States) is a 1987 puzzle video game. It was written by British developers Major Developments and published by Incentive Software for the ZX Spectrum, Commodore 64, Amstrad CPC, Amiga, Atari ST, and MS-DOS. It uses the Freescape 3D game engine.

== Plot ==
In the far future, the human race has abandoned Earth for the reaches of outer space, having ruined the planet in the relentless quest for resources and in endless conflict. In a desperate search to find a new home, they found Evath, a life-sustaining planet with two moons, Mitral and Tricuspid. They sent a ship, named "Exodus" to colonize this new planet with explorers, embryos and supplies. Generations passed, and the colony on Evath was formed. Without the rule of law, the oldest members of the Exodus' crew, the Elders, were forced to take control, form an army and bring the rule of law to Evath.

Lesleigh Skerrit aspired to work for the Driller Federation. His grandfather had been a member of the Federation, but he was falsely accused of murder and banished as a Ketar. Only later did the evidence contesting his guilt surface, but it was too late - the law did not allow someone banished as a Ketar to return to Evath. Lesleigh was not bitter and did not seek retribution. He wanted to study law to prevent this kind of mistake happening again.

Called in by his superior, Montigue Yarbro, he is offered a lifetime opportunity - to complete his training and gain a promotion to Elite within the Driller Federation in one fell swoop. His experience on Mitral bore him well - he was to go to Mitral and attempt to avert the coming catastrophe. Mitral, having been abandoned in its unstable state by the Ketars, was going to explode within four hours, and the explosion would take Evath with it. Skerrit's mission was to use the excavation probe "Last Hope" to place eighteen drilling rigs around Mitral to allow the gas to dissipate harmlessly into space and prevent this disaster. Things are not so simple though, with the security systems activated prior to the Ketars' departure.

== Gameplay ==
The game requires the player to maneuver the excavation probe, through a first-person view, through eighteen regions (in the shape of a rhombicuboctahedron) of the moon Mitral, and place a drilling rig in each of them to allow a minimum of 50% of the gas to escape. The position is established by a mixture of clues from the landscape (including an "X marks the spot" in the first zone) and trial and error. The security systems will attack Lesleigh upon sight, and he must disable or avoid them by any means possible. Only a few can be destroyed by shooting, while the rest must be dispatched by mechanical means through switches or similar.

The eighteen regions are actually platforms above the true surface of Mitral; the excavation probe cannot fly or hover (although it can rise and lower itself slightly on hydraulics), and moving off a platform causes the player to fall onto the surface and become marooned. However, in one area the player can find a garage containing a hovering vehicle that can be used to explore and attack security systems, though not to place drilling rigs.

== Development ==
Driller was the first game to use the Freescape engine, which allowed the production of full three-dimensional environments using filled polygons in which the player could move around freely. It also gave the player the ability to look up and down, as well as rotate left and right, something which was rare amongst 3D games of the time. The same engine was used for Driller's sequel, Dark Side, with updated versions for Total Eclipse, The Sphinx Jinx, Castle Master and Castle Master II: The Crypt.

== Reception ==
Reception

Review scores
Publication	Score
Amstrad Action	96%
Crash	97%
Computer and Video Games	34/40
Sinclair User	9/10
Your Sinclair	9/10
Zzap!64	96%
ACE	956
The Games Machine	95%

Awards
Publication	Award
Zzap!64	Gold Medal
C+VG	C+VG Hit
Crash	Crash Smash
Amstrad Action	4th best game of all time

The game received positive reviews from several sources. CRASH awarded the game 97%, praising its use of 3D graphics, "challenging" gameplay, and the exploration of game's world. The magazine's readers voted it the best overall game of 1987. Your Sinclair gave Driller 9/10 with reviewer Phil South stating that "the game took a year to build, and it shows in the quality of the workmanship and the gameplay. I can tell that people are going to be sending in tips for this for months to come. Superb!" Zzap!64 awarded the game 96%. Amstrad Action reviewed the game in the January 1988 issue with an overall rating of 96% and earned the AA 'Mastergame' accolade. Orson Scott Card wrote in Compute! that "the lame science fiction story ... is a thinly veiled excuse for what's really a programmer's exercise in 3-D graphics. But once you stop expecting the story to make sense, this is a fun game, as you explore a strange world ... a fascinating experience".
