= Castle Master =

1990 video game

- Cover art of the compilation release
- Developer: Incentive Software
- Publisher: Domark
- Designer: Ian Andrew
- Programmers: Chris Andrew; Paul Gregory; Sean Ellis
- Artist: Mike Salmon
- Writer: Mel Croucher
- Engine: Freescape
- Platforms: ZX Spectrum, Commodore 64, Amstrad CPC, Atari ST, Amiga, IBM PC
- Release: 1990
- Genres: Role-playing, puzzle
- Mode: Single-player

Castle Master is a 1990 video game developed by Incentive Software and published by Domark. It was released for the ZX Spectrum, Commodore 64, Amstrad CPC, Amiga, Atari ST and IBM PC. A compilation was released also in 1990 that contained the original and the sequel, Castle Master II: The Crypt.

== Gameplay ==
The player approaches the castle, which is rendered in flat-shaded 3D polygons.

Initially the player chooses between playing as the prince or princess. The character not chosen is then taken away by a dragon to Castle Eternity. (The location of keys and some other items differ slightly between the two characters.)

The game requires the player, through a first person view, to explore Castle Eternity. There are riddles on many of the castle walls, which give gameplay hints. There are also keys and pentacles hidden in various locations for the player to collect. Many rooms contain spirits which attack the player and reduce his or her health. The player's health (represented by a barbell where weights indicate the amount) is also the player's strength which is important for some puzzles. The player's only weapon is an unlimited supply of rocks to throw, but a single hit is sufficient to exorcise most of the spirits. The ultimate goal is to kill the boss spirit Magister (who can only be killed when all other spirits in the castle are destroyed) and thereby rescue the character's opposite number.

The player only has a single life; if health is reduced to nothing the game is restarted from the beginning unless the player loads a saved game.

== Development and release ==
Castle Master was built using the updated Freescape engine, which allowed solid, fully three-dimensional environments to be produced. The same engine (albeit updated for each game) had been used for Driller, Dark Side and Total Eclipse which had previously been released by Incentive Software. Castle Master marked the first release in a deal with Domark who marketed the game leaving Incentive free to concentrate on the development.

A sequel using the same engine, Castle Master II: The Crypt, was published together with Castle Master on a compilation exclusively for members of The Home Computer Club. The two games later featured on Domark's Virtual Worlds compilation in 1991 which also included Driller and Total Eclipse.

The game's backstory was written by Mel Croucher.

== Reception ==
Reception

Award
Publication	Award
Amstrad Action	Mastergame

The game was ranked the 39th best game for the Amiga in Issue 0 of Amiga Power (May 1991). The budget re-release was reviewed by Linda Barker in Issue 17 (September 1992) receiving a 70% score. Jeux & Stratégie commented that the Freescape games were starting to lose originality and awarded the game a score of 7/10.
