= Legend of Faerghail =

1990 video game

- Cover art by Celal Kandemiroglu
- Developer: Electronic Design Hannover
- Publisher: reLINE Software
- Designers: Olaf Barthel; Veith Schörgenhummer; Matthias Kästner
- Programmer: Olaf Barthel
- Artist: Matthias Kästner
- Composer: Andreas Starr
- Platforms: Amiga, Atari ST, MS-DOS
- Release: 1990
- Genre: Role-playing
- Mode: Single-player

Legend of Faerghail is a 1990 role-playing video game, developed by Electronic Design Hannover and published by reLINE Software for the Amiga, Atari ST and MS-DOS.

== Gameplay ==
Legend of Faerghail is set in a medieval fantasy world. The player first creates a character by selecting race and class. Characters have attributes (such as wisdom, strength and constitution), skills (such as pick-pocketing and various languages) and hit points.

The game is viewed from first-person perspective. The game world includes an overworld split by a mountain range, and eight dungeons.

It also offered the player the opportunity to continue their characters from previous games such as Phantasie I, Phantasie III, The Bard's Tale and The Bard's Tale II: The Destiny Knight, although Faerghail does not take place in the same fictional world as these games.

== Reception ==
Peter Olafson of Computer Gaming World in 1991 described the game as "a Bard's Tale cousin with a horde of bells and whistles". The magazine praised the Amiga version's graphics and audio, but criticized the lengthy load times, poor play balance when starting with new characters, and errors in the translation. The magazine's Scorpia was much more negative, describing the game as a "German import that should never have crossed the Atlantic". She criticized the IBM PC version's graphics, documentation, and combat as "poor" and "absurd", and "a mediocre effort at best". Zzap!64 awarded an overall of 90%, highlighting game mechanics such as the language system, different ways of tackling locked doors, and wearing effects on weapons and armour. The game's presentation was also praised, with its atmospheric sound effects.
