= Splat! (video game) =

1983 video game

- ZX Spectrum cover
- Developers: Ian Andrew; Ian Morgan
- Publisher: Incentive Software
- Platforms: ZX Spectrum, Commodore 64, Amstrad CPC, SAM Coupé
- Release: 1983
- Genres: Maze
- Mode: Single-player

Splat! is a maze video game published for the ZX Spectrum in 1983 by Incentive Software of Reading, England. It was subsequently released for the Amstrad CPC, Commodore 64, and SAM Coupé.

== Gameplay ==
ZX Spectrum version

The player guides Zippy, an X-shaped sprite, through a top-down maze featuring solid walls, hazards, and collectible rewards. The maze view scrolls randomly left, right, up, or down. The objective is for the player to survive for a length of time without making contact with either the edges of the screen, represented as brick walls, or hazards such as water and spikes, all of which result in losing a life. If the player survives, they receive a score bonus and advance to the next level, which is a continuation of the maze with less interval between scrolling steps and a shorter duration. The first level lasts about two minutes, and by the seventh and final level, this duration decreases to around forty seconds. Points are awarded for collecting plums and clumps of grass, some of which are invisible.

Completing a level triggers a voice saying "Yippee!". On the ZX Spectrum release, this was remarkable due to it overcoming the Spectrum's rudimentary sound capabilities. It was a very early use of digitized speech sound effects in home computer games.

== Promotion ==
In a launch promotion, Incentive Software offered £500 to the player with the highest score by 14 January 1984. The prize was won by 17-year-old James Tant, who scored 112,930 points. This was the first of Incentive Software's game-promoting competitions, for which the company was named.

== Releases ==
The ZX Spectrum version was programmed by Ian Andrew, founder of Incentive Software, with Ian Morgan. It was released in 1983. In 1984, the Commodore 64 version was published, credited to Ian Andrew and Steve Zodiac. The game was released for the Amstrad CPC in 1985, attributed to Ian Andrew and Paul Shirley, using different colours from previous releases such as pink instead of white for the maze background. The SAM Coupé version was released in 1991, coded by Colin Jordan and using that machine's advanced audio capabilities in the background music.

== Legacy ==
The game was re-released for Spectrum, Commodore 64 and Amstrad CPC in 1992 by Alternative Software as part of the 4-Most Thrillers compilation along with Martech's Mega Apocalypse, The Fury and Vixen.
