= Testament (video game) =

1996 video game

- Developer(s): Insanity
- Publisher(s): APC&TCP; Islona; Signum
- Series: Testament
- Platform(s): Amiga
- Release: 1996
- Genre(s): First-person shooter
- Mode(s): Single-player

Testament is a 1996 video game by Insanity for the Amiga. It is a horror first-person shooter.

== Plot ==
The game follows a soldier who participates in an expedition to find crypt of the ancient magus Ghuwta. Ghuwta a powerful sorcerer who ruled a strong empire was 4,000 years ago. The player's character gets separated from the expedition and has to escape the haunted land.

== Gameplay ==
The game has similar gameplay to Wolfenstein 3D and Doom. There are 16 levels in the game and the player has to find a piece of scroll (the eponymous Testament) in every single level. The piece is usually hidden behind a door and so the player has to find a key first. To fight enemies, players can use four weapons -a basic handgun, a machine-gun, a fireball-gun and a double-gun.

== Development ==
The game was developed by Insanity. Filip Doksanský originally intended Testament to be a port of Wolfenstein 3D' for Amiga. The game was introduced in 1996, during Amiga Workshop. The game was released the same year.

== Reception ==
The game has received generally favourable reviews. Andy Smith gave the game 92% in his review. He commented it as "a splendid game that concentrates on making the gaming experience as enjoyable as possible." Another reviewer, Joachim Froholt, commented Testament as "a hugely entertaining and atmospheric game which stands up surprisingly well when compared to the best 3D shooters of today."

In the Czech magazine Amiga Review the game scored with 60%. The review praised the atmosphere, gameplay and music. On the other hand, it criticised the technical aspect of the game such as AI of enemies or the engine.

== Legacy ==
A sequel, Testament II, was produced by Insanity in 1998. It was the last title released by the team. Its members later founded the company Black Element Software.

== See also ==
- Breathless (video game)
- Behind the Iron Gate
- Cytadela (video game)
- Fears (video game)
- Gloom (video game)
- Alien Breed 3D
