= Gloom 3 =

1997 video game

- Developer: Alpha Software
- Publisher: Guildhall
- Composers: Chris Burns, Richard Murfin
- Platform: Amiga
- Release: 1997
- Genre: First-person shooter
- Mode: Single-player

Gloom 3 (also known as Ultimate Gloom and Gloom 3: Zombie Edition) is a video game for the Amiga computer, released in 1997. Gloom 3 was the third proper, commercially released clone of the first-person shooter Doom in the Gloom series on the Amiga.

Gloom 3's author, Gareth Murfin, was proprietor of Alpha Software, with additional graphics made by James Caygill and Jason Jordache.

The game was one of two games produced by Alpha Software for the Amiga, the other being Zombie Massacre, at a time when the machine was less popular. Although the game was critically well received by publications such as CU Amiga, at the time of release games for the Amiga were on the decline and not deemed commercially viable, and the game received criticism for its appearance.

Despite the "3" in the title, this is actually the second game in the Gloom series, as there is no such game as Gloom 2. According to one of the people who worked on this game, the reason for the game being called "Gloom 3" was because he confused Gloom Deluxe for Gloom 2, even though Gloom Deluxe was actually an updated version of the first game, not a sequel.

The game was released as freeware in 2013. Following the source code for the Gloom engine being released in 2017, a compatible source port for modern systems was created in 2020 called ZGloom.
