= 5 A Day Adventures =

- Developer: eMotion Studios
- Publisher: Dole Food Company
- Director: Paul Lundahl
- Producer: Patsy Northcutt
- Programmers: Grig Billam, John-Erik Omland
- Artists: Halstead Craig Hannah, Michael Ringseis
- Writer: Lissa Rovetech
- Composer: Phil Schroeder
- Platforms: Microsoft Windows, Mac OS
- Release: 1993
- Genre: Education
- Mode: Single-user

5 A Day Adventures is an educational entertainment computer product developed by eMotion Studios.

== Purpose ==
The software teaches third-grade students to eat fruits and vegetables daily. It features singing and rapping partially-clothed cartoon fruit and vegetables that explain how their actual counterparts are grown, nutritionally valued and cooked.

== Publication history ==
The program was published and produced by the Dole Food Company, in collaboration with the Society for Nutrition Education and Behavior. It was given to more than 18,000 schools across the United States and bundled with the Macintosh Quadra 630 series. In all, 270,000 copies were distributed.

== See also ==
- Preventice
