= Incentive Software =

British video game developer

Incentive Software Ltd.
- Industry: Video games
- Founded: 1983
- Founder: Ian Andrew
- Successor: Superscape
- Headquarters: Reading, Berkshire, United Kingdom

Incentive Software Ltd. was a British video game developer and publisher founded by Ian Andrew in 1983. Programmers included Sean Ellis, Stephen Northcott and Ian's brother Chris Andrew.

Later games were based on the company's Freescape rendering engine. Developed in-house, Freescape is considered to be one of the first proprietary 3D engines to be used in video games, although the engine was not used commercially outside of Incentive's own titles. The project was originally thought to be so ambitious that according to Ian Andrew, the company struggled to recruit programmers for the project, with many believing that it could not be achieved.

According to Paul Gregory (graphics artist for Major Developments, Incentive's in-house design team), Freescape was developed by Chris Andrew starting in September 1986 on an Amstrad CPC, as it was the most suitable development system with 128K memory and had adequate power to run 3D environments. Due to the engine's success, it was later ported to all the dominant systems of the era: ZX Spectrum, IBM PC, Commodore 64, Amiga, and Atari ST. Freescape development ended in 1992 with the release of 3D Construction Kit II.

The company was renamed Dimension International as it moved into the VR field in 1995 with its next-generation Superscape VRT engine, then later changed name again to Superscape.

== List of titles ==
The following games were published and/or developed by Incentive Software:

Year	Title	Platform
1983	Splat!	Amstrad CPC, Commodore 64, ZX Spectrum
1983	Mountains of Ket	ZX Spectrum
1983	1984	BBC/Electron, ZX Spectrum
1984	Millionaire	Amstrad CPC, BBC/Electron, ZX Spectrum
1984	Temple of Vran	ZX Spectrum
1984	The Final Mission	ZX Spectrum
1984	Confuzion	Amstrad CPC, BBC/Electron, Commodore 64, ZX Spectrum
1984	Back Track	Dragon 32
1985	Moon Cresta	Amstrad CPC, BBC, Commodore 64, Dragon 32, ZX Spectrum
1985	Eddie Steady Go!	Dragon 32
1986	The Graphic Adventure Creator	Amstrad CPC, BBC, Commodore 64, ZX Spectrum
1986	The Ket Trilogy	Amstrad CPC, BBC/Electron, Commodore 64, Dragon 32,
1986	Winter Wonderland	Amstrad CPC, BBC, Commodore 64, ZX Spectrum
1986	Dragon's Tooth	BBC
1986	The Legend of the Apache Gold	Amstrad CPC, Commodore 64, ZX Spectrum
1987	The Adventure Creator	Electron
1987	Driller	Amiga, Amstrad CPC, Atari ST, Commodore 64, IBM PC, ZX Spectrum
1987	Karyssia: Queen of Diamonds	ZX Spectrum
1988	The ST Adventure Creator	Atari ST
1988	Dark Side	Amiga, Amstrad CPC, Atari ST, Commodore 64, IBM PC, ZX Spectrum
1988	Total Eclipse	Amiga, Amstrad CPC, Atari ST, Commodore 64, IBM PC, ZX Spectrum
1990	Castle Master	Amiga, Amstrad CPC, Atari ST, Commodore 64, IBM PC, ZX Spectrum
1990	Castle Master II: The Crypt	Amiga, Amstrad CPC, Atari ST, Commodore 64, IBM PC, ZX Spectrum
1990	Total Eclipse II: The Sphinx Jinx	Amstrad CPC, Commodore 64, ZX Spectrum
1991	3D Construction Kit	Amiga, Amstrad CPC, Atari ST, Commodore 64, IBM PC, ZX Spectrum
1992	3D Construction Kit II	Amiga, Atari ST, IBM PC
