= Gloom (video game) =

1995 Amiga video game

- Developer: Black Magic Software
- Publisher: Guildhall
- Composer: Kev Stannard
- Platforms: Amiga, Amiga CD32
- Release: May 14, 1995
- Genre: First-person shooter
- Mode: Single-player

Gloom is a 1995 computer game for the Amiga computer. Gloom was the first commercially released Amiga clone of first-person shooter Doom.

== Gameplay ==
Gloom features 'Messy' or 'Meaty' graphics settings. If 'Messy' graphics are enabled, gibs from enemies explode more violently but disappear promptly, and if 'Meaty' graphics are enabled, all gibs from defeated enemies will remain on the floor where they died until the level is completed. Gloom Deluxe is playable on a workbench screen, a feature absent from its predecessor. Gloom has a two-player mode, and can be played over a network or by using split screen.

== History ==
Gloom was developed as an Amiga Doom clone by Mark Sibly (programmer) Kurt & Hans Butler (graphics), Laki Schuster (additional artwork) and Kev Stannard (music). A later version of the game, Gloom Deluxe, featured higher resolution graphic modes.

Gloom was followed by Gloom 3 by Alpha Software, who also produced Zombie Massacre. A Gloom 2 was announced by Black Magic Software along with Deluxe but was not ultimately released.

A reverse engineered engine for the game was worked on in 2011 called XGloom. In January 2017 the assembly and BlitzBasic 2 source code of Gloom was released as public domain software under unlicense on GitHub. The assets were released "for historical and archiving purposes". A source port for modern systems (including AmigaOS 4) was then created in 2020 called ZGloom, which also supports the various custom levels and total conversions created for the engine, including Gloom 3 and Zombie Massacre.

== Development ==
Gloom's map editor and utility programs were written in Blitz BASIC, a programming language written by Mark Sibly, one of the developers of Gloom. Gloom was developed in a year, and development began in May 1994. In a 1995 issue of The One, a British gaming magazine, Gloom was previewed before release with some information about its development. Gloom was also the cover story of this issue, and a demo of Gloom was included on the cover disk. The One's logo is on several walls in Gloom in the demo. Several developers at Black Magic Software were interviewed, including Mark Sibly, Hans and Kurt Butler, who worked on graphics, and Kev Stannard. Mark stated in regards to Gloom's name: "The name sort of started out as a joke ... just something to call the project while we were working on it. By the time we had to settle on a 'real' name, we threw around some petty weird ones like Gorefest '95, and Bloodbath, but wound up sticking with Gloom. Probably because we were all used to it."

The crew behind Gloom met while working on a game together, with Mark describing the situation as "a bit of a drama, to be honest. We'd gone over there to work for this rich guy who wanted to get into the games publishing biz, but things turned pretty ugly at the end. We actually finished the game, but nothing ever came of it." While it is a Doom clone, the development team attempted to differentiate Gloom from its inspiration and other Doom clones by dividing the game into "distinct graphic styles" to "alter the mood of the game entirely." A trait noted by Kurt Butler is that many other Doom clones' sprites "don't really stand out from the background graphics ... I think this is due to the fact that they used colours too dull and similar to the background shades." Gloom's enemy sprites are designed to stand out from the background, which aids the player to see them at a distance.

A key feature of Gloom is that all enemies explode into gibs upon being killed rather than leaving a corpse, and to promote this feature, a competition was run in The One magazine to correctly match up pictured in-game gibs with what body part/organ they are, with the winner's face being put into Gloom. The game was deliberately designed to be more fast-paced and arcade like than other first-person shooters. The game even features playable arcade cabinets hidden in some levels.

Gloom was stated to cost £29.99 in 1995.

== Reception ==
Reception

Review scores
Publication	Score
CU Amiga	90% (Amiga)
The One	90% (Amiga)

The game was ranked the 18th best game of all time by Amiga Power. The One magazine gave Gloom an overall score of 90%, stating: "The emphasis of the game is on action, and there is plenty of it. ... The only disappointing thing I can think of is that there is a distinct lack of weapons. Only one gun can be carried at a time ... The guns get quite beefy but the ability to carry a massive arsenal and swap between shotguns, bazookas, et al is sadly missing." The One found the gibbing of enemies "immensely satisfying" and referred to Gloom as "bloody brilliant"

CU Amiga gave Gloom an overall score of 90%, praising Gloom's rock soundtrack, and calling its graphics and enemies 'impressive'. CU Amiga expressed that they feel Gloom differentiates itself from Doom, stating that while Doom 'has more atmosphere', Gloom is "more frantic". CU Amiga summarises Gloom's combat as "excellent".

In The 100 Greatest Amiga Games, Tom Crossland wrote that "this 1995 FPS seems quite cultish. The original version is horrendously blocky (to the point of hardly being able to see anything) but Gloom Deluxe cleaned this up a bit. The over the top gore and gibbing in the game is fun but I'm afraid the appeal of Gloom was always rather lost on me. It was very difficult to get into an Amiga FPS in the post-Doom world."

Gloom Deluxe was listed as among the 5 Best Amiga Games Of All Time by Amitopia, declaring "Gloom Deluxe is simply in the list of best Amiga games because it is the best 3D FPS game for Amiga and it is only available for the Amiga platform. It is a gem that shouldn’t be overlooked. For what you get, you get a lot with this game." A previous review on the site also took issue with it being dismissed as a mere Doom clone. Nostalgia Nerd noted that "this game IS DOOM. But yet its not. It manages to be what DOOM is, with less resources, less memory and less potential profit, but yet somehow manages to be it's [sic] own game. Also, top marks for the cover art. I played it recently, and was hooked for some considerable time."

== See also ==
- Breathless (video game)
- Behind the Iron Gate
- Cytadela (video game)
- Fears (video game)
- Alien Breed 3D
- Testament (video game)
