= Celtic Legends =

1991 video game

- Developer: Ubi Soft
- Publisher: Ubi Soft
- Platform: Amiga
- Release: 1991

Celtic Legends is a 1991 turn-based strategy video game published by Ubi Soft for Amiga.

== Gameplay ==
Celtic Legends is a game in which two sorcerer-generals, Eskel and Sogrom, wage war against each other in the land of Celtika.

== Reception ==
Reception

Review scores
Publication	Score
Aktueller Software Markt	9/12
Amiga Action	91%
Amiga Format	85%
Amiga Power	89%

Allen Greenberg reviewed the game for Computer Gaming World, and stated that "Legends is really a respectable piece of work, one only hard-core strategists may wish to avoid. Those casual players who enjoy some depth to their simulations, without the danger of drowning, will probably have a good time with it."

Alan Bunker for Amiga Action called the game "Overwhelmingly addictive and fantastic fun to play", noting how its graphics and sound added to its appeal and depth

Karl Foster for Amiga Power called the game "a real challenge to master even against the computer player" but noted that the two-player option "brings to light numerous new ways of completing the game".

Tom Malcom for Info felt that the game "adds so much pizazz and polish" to the strategy, and wargaming genre, and complemented the control interface.

Ed Ricketts for Amiga Format said that despite needing a little more on the effects side, he found it "a really absorbing, and pretty intelligent game that has real long-term potential".

Mike Pattenden for CU Amiga found that the game has "more than enough depth and variety to keep you going" despite its restricted role-playing element.
