= Brides of Dracula (video game) =

1992 video game

- Developer: Gonzo Games
- Platforms: Amiga, Atari ST
- Release: UK: 1992
- Genre: Action
- Modes: Single-player, Multiplayer

Brides of Dracula is a 1992 action-platformer video game developed and published by Gonzo Games for the Amiga and Atari ST. Playing as either Dracula or Van Helsing, players must race the other character in a split screen to collect thirteen brides or items to defeat the other. Developed by a team within Gonzo Games titled The Toast Factory, the game's design was inspired by licensed horror titles. Upon release, Brides of Dracula received mixed reviews, with critics faulting the game's graphics due to the split-screen design, and repetition of gameplay.

== Gameplay ==
The Amiga version of Brides of Dracula, depicting the split screen gameplay between Dracula and Van Helsing.

Players choose one of two characters with a separate objective: Dracula, who aims to find thirteen women as brides, bite them, and lead them back to his castle, and Van Helsing, who must find thirteen items, such as a silver bullet or prayer book, that can destroy Dracula. The chosen character must find each woman or item, and return it to their starting point; once all thirteen have been collected, that character wins. The game is a side-scrolling split screen title where the player controls their character on one end of the screen, and the opposing character pursues their objectives on the other. Both characters explore the same game world, split across five areas, which can be traversed jumping across platforms, going up stairs, or using teleporters, secret passages and dungeons. As they explore the world for their chosen items, players must avoid hazards, including villagers, other monsters or vampire hunters, environmental hazards, and the opposing character. Players can defend using basic combat moves including a kick or punch, and if they are successful in attacking the other player, they can cause the other to lose a weapon or bride. The game supports local multiplayer for two, with each player assuming the role of Dracula and Van Helsing.

== Plot ==
In the town of Bistritz, Transylvania, Van Helsing is summoned by carriage after receiving a telegram for assistance. Directed at the local inn to the graveyard by the villagers, who deny knowledge of vampires, Van Helsing meets a woman. The woman states that Dracula has kidnapped her sister to his castle in the night, and pleads that you save her from the vampire. Meanwhile, Dracula prepares to kidnap thirteen women from the town to become his brides, draining their life force so he can once and for all destroy Van Helsing. Without his stake and garlic, Van Helsing must find objects to complete the ritual to destroy Dracula. The game begins as both characters start a race to destroy the other.

== Development ==
The game was published by Gonzo Games, a British company, and the third title after Wipe Out and Street Hockey. The development team within Gonzo Games, titled The Toast Factory, included executive producer Paul Smith and programmers Jason Green, Alan Botwright, Greg Modern and Eddie Haynes, who had previously worked on games for other companies including Turrican, Judge Dredd and The Hunt for Red October (1990 video game). Smith stated that development originally explored licensed horror concepts, including Bride of Frankenstein and Werewolf in London, before settling on the vampire theme. The company showcased the game at the 1990 European Computer Entertainment Show trade show.

== Reception ==
Reception

Review scores
Publication	Score
Aktueller Software Markt	3/10
Amiga Action	70%
Amiga Computing	31%
Amiga Format	73% / 54%
Amiga Power	59%
Amiga Joker	39%
CU Amiga	73%

Upon release, the game received mixed reviews. Critics were mixed on the gameplay, with several finding the game repetitive. Amiga Computing critiqued the game's execution, considering the "back-and-forth" act of collecting brides or weapons was "thoughtless". Many critics found the game to lack depth overall, with Aktueller Software Markt deriding its "utter lack of substance", and Amiga World considering its exploration mechanics could have benefited from being able to search or talk to characters. The graphics and sound were also criticised, with Amiga Computing faulting the "stilted" animation and small sprites, and Amiga Joker describing the game's presentation as "awful" due to the decision to display the game in split screen. Several reviewers expressed amusement at the animation of the Van Helsing character.
