= Fears (video game) =

1995 video game

- Developer(s): Bomb Software
- Publisher(s): Manyk
- Designer(s): Alberto Longo; Pierpaolo Di Maio
- Programmer(s): Frederic Heintz
- Artist(s): Stephane Elbaz; Laurent Sebire; Corentin Jaffre; Carlos Pardo
- Composer(s): Mathieu Berthaud
- Platform(s): Amiga 1200
- Release: 1995
- Genre(s): First-person shooter
- Mode(s): Single-player

Fears is a first-person shooter released in 1995 for the Amiga 1200 developed by Bomb Software and published by Manyk. The game features thirty levels, and also includes a built in level editor. Fears received average to positive notices in the Amiga press, following the release of previews and a demo, with retrospective reviews more critical. The game was reissued for a 25th Anniversary Edition in 2020.

== See also ==
- Breathless
- Behind the Iron Gate
- Cytadela
- Gloom
- Alien Breed 3D
- Testament
