= Behind the Iron Gate =

1995 video game

- Developer(s): Ego
- Publisher(s): Black Legend
- Programmer(s): Witold Gantzke
- Composer(s): Adam Skorupa
- Platform(s): Amiga OCS/ECS
- Release: EU: 1995
- Genre(s): First-person shooter

Behind the Iron Gate (Polish: Za Żelazną Bramą) is a first-person shooter computer game for Amiga computers, released in 1995 by Polish developer Ego. The game is coded by Witold Gantzke. Music is composed by Adam Skorupa, who also created soundtrack for The Witcher.

== See also ==
- Breathless
- Cytadela
- Fears
- Gloom
- Alien Breed 3D
- Testament
