= Cytadela (video game) =

1995 video game

- Developer: Virtual Design
- Publishers: Black Legend; Arrakis Software
- Designers: Paweł Matusz; Artur Bardowski; Jakub Bardowski; Jan Rózycki; Artur Opala; Marcin Stangel
- Programmer: Paweł Matusz
- Artists: Artur Bardowski; Radek Czeczotka
- Composer: Artur Opala
- Platform: Amiga 500
- Release: 1995
- Genre: First-person shooter
- Mode: Single-player

Cytadela or Citadel is a 1995 first-person shooter developed by Virtual Design and released by Polish publisher Arrakis Software and in English by Black Legend for the Amiga 500 and later. The game is set on a prison island in the middle of a prisoner revolt. The game received generally positive reviews in the Amiga press. An open-source version for modern PCs was started in 2006. A fixed up version for the original Amiga was released in 2022. The source code to the original was also released under a noncommerical license.

== See also ==
- Breathless
- Behind the Iron Gate
- Fears
- Gloom
- Alien Breed 3D
- Testament
