= D.R.A.G.O.N. Force =

1989 video game

- Developer: Interstel Corporation
- Publisher: Interstel Corporation
- Designer: Roger Damon
- Platforms: Amiga, MS-DOS
- Release: 1989
- Genre: Turn-based strategy

D.R.A.G.O.N. Force is a 1989 computer wargame published by Interstel Corporation for Amiga and MS-DOS. The name is an acronym for "Drastic Response Assault Group Operations Network".

== Gameplay ==
D.R.A.G.O.N. Force is a strategy game in which the player commands a squad of commandos.

== Reception ==
Jesse W. Cheng reviewed the game for Computer Gaming World, and stated that "there is a nice flavor to the game, as one really feels like he or she is in the middle of a firefight with all the chaos and confusion".
