= 9 Lives (video game) =

1990 video game

- Developer: ARC
- Designer: Graham 'Kenny' Everett
- Artist: Simon Lawson
- Platforms: Amiga, Atari ST
- Release: November 1990
- Genre: Platform
- Mode: Single-player

9 Lives is a platform game released in 1990 for the Amiga and Atari ST. It was developed by ARC, a software division of Atari Corporation. The player takes the role of Bob Cat, who must rescue Claudette from a mad scientist who kidnapped her.

== Plot ==
Bob Cat must rescue his girlfriend Claudette Cat from a mad scientist who kidnapped her.

== Gameplay ==
9 Lives is a platform game where the player takes the role of Bob Cat, and accessing different areas of the level relies on jumping. The longer the player holds down the joystick, the more power is used to jump; the height and distance of a jump is determined by how much power the player uses.

Mutant animals are scattered throughout each level and attack Bob if he gets too close, causing the player to slowly lose energy while touching them. Bob can attack enemies using a ball of wool, stunning them temporarily. Bob's energy and jump meters are represented by icons of Bob's tail on the left and right of the screen. The player has nine lives, and the player loses a life when they run out of energy, fall onto a spike trap, or fall too far down. Six cats are locked in cages on each level; the player must find keys throughout the level to unlock them. Freeing all six cats allows the player to go to the next level. Keys can also be used to unlock secret rooms, which have items such as powerups or extra lives.

The game has four levels, with the final level being the mad scientist's warehouse. Each level has more than a hundred rooms. Throughout each level Bob can pick up powerups giving the player various temporary abilities including flight, invisibility, and immunity to damage; potions created by the mad scientist may have negative effects if picked up. Food restores energy when picked up, and items such as jewels award points.

== Development ==
9 Lives was developed by ARC, a software division of Atari, and was released for Amiga and Atari ST in November 1990. The game's designer Graham 'Kenny' Everett said in regards to the artstyle of the game that "Cartoon style games have never really taken on in computer games, which is really surprising as it lends itself so well to animation. I think the gameplay aspect has always been lacking in these games and so we decided to try and combine comical cartoon style characters with fast moving gameplay." Bob Cat was named after Bob Katz, an ARC staff member.

In 1991, the Atari ST version of 9 Lives was included in the compilation Discovery Xtra.

== Reception ==
Reception

Review scores
Publication	Score
Atari ST User	91% (Atari ST)
Raze	93% (Atari ST); 90% (Amiga)
ST Action	88% (Atari ST)
The One	82% (Atari ST)
Amiga Action	80% (Amiga)
Zero	79/100 (Atari ST)
Pelit	76/100 (Amiga, ST)
ST Format	74% (Atari ST)
Datormagazin	70% (Amiga, ST)
Amiga Format	64% (Amiga)
Aktueller Software Markt	6/12 (Amiga, ST)
Amiga Joker	44% (Amiga)
Power Play	19% (Atari ST)

9 Lives' cartoon graphics and sense of humor were praised by critics, and reviews noted the game's difficulty. Amiga Format criticized its difficulty, noting the game's jump mechanic as a "nice idea" that is "almost impossible" in practice due to the precision required, and Datormagazin said that the game was "rather difficult" to the point of being "utterly impossible" and "tiresome". Power Play called the game "antiquated", summarizing the game as a whole as "a wasteland of ideas combined with amateurish technical execution".

Raze noted the game's "impressive" graphics, and ST Action stated that it has "originality, inventiveness, and great playability all in one game", and noted its "large variety" of animations and sprites. The One compared 9 Lives to "mediocre" games based on licensed characters, stating that the game is "what [they] should have been", praising its visuals and gameplay, calling it "an exciting platform game which guarantees hours of absorbing fun". Amiga Format expressed that the game "captures that Tom and Jerry feel" and praised its "big and bold" graphics, but criticized the game as shallow, stating that "great graphics are no substitute for gameplay"

Several magazines praised the games' sense of humor; ST Format praised its Looney Tunes-style humor, and Atari ST User called the game "a delight" that "oozes charm and humour". Multiple critics from Amiga Action reviewed the game, with Steve Merret calling the game "an excellent platform romp", praising its variety and visuals, calling it "extremely well animated" and expressed that the game's humor "add[s] to its character". Doug Simmons from Amiga Action was more critical, stating that he "didn't enjoy it in the slightest", describing its gameplay as "very awkward".

Amiga Joker praised the game's visuals but criticized its gameplay, calling it a "neat platform game ... ruined by imprecise controls and stuttery scrolling". Aktueller Software Markt criticized the game's "imprecise" controls, expressing that the game "performs badly" and that the game is too expensive. ASM and Power Play criticized the game's music, with the former comparing it to a charivari, and the latter stating that "the music is half of a professional standard".

Zero expressed that the game "falls slightly flat", criticizing it as unoriginal, stating that "there's nothing outstandingly new here, just a fairly well put together platform game". Pelit criticized the small color palette of the Amiga version.

== See also ==
- Bobcat
