= Fireteam 2200 =

1991 video game

- Developer: SimSystems
- Publisher: SimSystems
- Platforms: Amiga, MS-DOS
- Release: 1991
- Genre: Computer wargame

Fireteam 2200 is a computer wargame published in 1991 for Amiga and MS-DOS by SimSystems.

== Gameplay ==
Fireteam 2200 is a game in which ground combat in the 23rd century can be played against the computer, or using a modem it can be played as a two-player game or head-to-head.

== Reception ==
Jesse W. Cheng reviewed the game for Computer Gaming World, and stated that "FireTeam 2200 was able to combine wargaming "realism," role-playing, solid EGA graphics and excellent AdLib sounds into a nice package. Despite the game's weaknesses (no scenario builder, lack of mouse support and a bit of complexity), this game would be a worthy addition to any wargame grognard's collection."

Alan Bunker for Amiga Action rated the game 70% and described it as "a game that will probably occupy you for a couple of days or so but not much longer".
