= Abandoned Places: A Time for Heroes =

1992 video game

- Developer: ArtGame
- Publisher: International Computer Entertainment
- Designers: Francis Staengler; István Fábián
- Artist: Jeno Klimits
- Composers: George Dragon; Lajos Suvak
- Platforms: Amiga, MS-DOS
- Release: EU: 1992
- Genres: Role-playing, dungeon crawl
- Mode: Single-player

Abandoned Places: A Time for Heroes is a Hungarian dungeon crawl role-playing video game developed by ArtGame and published in 1992 by International Computer Entertainment for Amiga and MS-DOS. An Amiga-only sequel, Abandoned Places 2, was released in 1993.

== Plot and gameplay ==
The player's party fighting a monster in a cave

The narrative sees a band of four heroes from the land of Kalynthia, to save their homeland from the clutches of the evil arch mage Bronagh.

During dungeon crawls the game switches to a 3D view and plays similar to Dungeon Master.

== Development ==
Abandoned Places was developed by the founders of Hungarian video game development company ArtGame, István Fábián and Ferenc Staengler, along with musician György Dragon, who joined them in 1989. The game was inspired by Advanced Dungeons & Dragons and Dungeon Master tabletop role-playing games. Starting in spring 1990 the company pitched the game to several publishers, including Electronic Arts, but they were finalizing the publishing deal for a similar game, Raven Software's Black Crypt just a week before, so they rejected the game. The game was finished and tested by January 1992, a month before its release. The developers received little to no compensation for their work on the game, they were even banned from the game's Hungarian launch event.

== Reception ==
Reception

Review scores
Publication	Score
Amiga Action	82% (Amiga)
Amiga Computing	93% (Amiga)
Amiga Format	80% (Amiga)
Amiga Power	80% (Amiga)
Amiga Mania	90% (Amiga)
CU Amiga	83% (Amiga)
Amiga Joker	75% (Amiga)

Amiga Power gave the Amiga version of Abandoned Places an overall score of 80%, praising the size of the game world, and expressed that Abandoned Places' leverage over other similar RPGs is that it has extensive above-ground locations in addition to its subterranean dungeons, furthermore, stating that "what you do above ground is every bit as important as your endeavours below." Amiga Power also praises Abandoned Places' level of difficulty, but criticises its "poor" graphics, calling its animations "lackluster" and almost '8-bit' looking in combat, expressing that "when so much effort has been put into every other aspect of something as huge as Abandoned Places, it seems a shame that it's so completely outgunned in such a very important area."
