= The Golden Path (video game) =

1986 video game

- Developer(s): Magic Logic
- Publisher(s): Firebird
- Platform(s): Amiga, Atari ST
- Release: EU: 1986
- Genre(s): Graphic adventure

The Golden Path is a point-and-click adventure video game published in 1986 by Firebird Software. The game's player character is Y'n Hsi, a Chinese Bhikkhu (Buddhist monk) and nobleman. Y'n Hsi seeks to depose Ch'un Kuei, a tyrannical warlord who murdered Y'n Hsi's father.
