= Crystal Hammer =

1988 video game

- Developer: reLINE Software
- Platform: Amiga
- Release: 1988
- Genre: Breakout clone
- Modes: Single-player, multiplayer

Crystal Hammer is a 1988 video game developed by reLINE Software for the Amiga.

== Gameplay ==
Crystal Hammer is a game similar to Breakout in which players control a bat in the form of a space capsule to hit an orb into an array of bricks presented as colored crystals. Hitting crystals with orb will knock them out, with the objective of the game to clear all in a level. Some crystals take more than one hit to clear, or provide players with abilities that increase the size of the bat or give it a weapon, slow or multiply the ball. The game features 30 levels.

== Reception ==
Reception

Review scores
Publication	Score
New Computer Express	3/5
TheOne	41%

Compute! praised Crystal Hammer for its "crisp and clear" sound and its "excellent" graphics and animation. The New Computer Express praised the game's visuals as an "enjoyable visual feast" and the smooth animation of the ball, whilst finding the obstacles flickered in a distracting way. Dismissing the game as "uninspired", TheOne viewed the game as derivative and featuring "little innovation or variation" from similar titles in its genre, finding the backdrops as "not particularly special" and the sound effects as "far from memorable".
