= Advanced Destroyer Simulator =

1990 video game

- Developer: Futura Games
- Publisher: Futura Games
- Platforms: Amiga, Amstrad CPC, Atari ST, MS-DOS
- Release: 1990

Advanced Destroyer Simulator is a naval-based video game, published by Futura Games for the Amiga, Atari ST, Amstrad CPC, and MS-DOS in 1990. Players are able to maneuver and carry out a variety of ship functions manually. The player faces various types of enemy ships and aircraft.
