= Globdule =

1993 video game

- Developer(s): Ex Animo Designs
- Publisher(s): Psygnosis
- Platform(s): Amiga
- Release: October 1993

Globdule is a 1993 video game from Psygnosis.

== Gameplay ==
Globdule is a quirky platformer that stars a melancholic pink blob dreaming of escape from his dreary underground life to become a toy. The game's premise is whimsical, and the blob can stick to any surface, including ceilings, adding inventive traversal to otherwise familiar platform gameplay. The visual style and character design are deliberately odd, using a gelatinous figure with oversized eyes. The game includes standard platform features like secret rooms, trap doors, and bonus lives.

== Development ==
The game was first mentioned in November 1992. The title was slated to release for Sega Genesis in Autumn 1994 but never did.

== Reception ==
Reception

Review scores
Publication	Score
Amiga Action	79%
Amiga Force	51%
Amiga Power	82%
Amiga Joker	62%
Amiga Format	69%
Joystick	80%
Kingston Informer	2/5

Kingston Informer gave the game a score of 2 out of 5 stating "This is definitely a game for the younger player, a competent but annoyingly fiddly offering from Psygnosis. If you want to buy one of its games, go for Wiz 'n' Liz, a far superior product."
