= Fighter Duel Pro 2 =

1994 combat flight simulator video game

- Developer(s): Jaeger Software
- Publisher(s): Jaeger Software
- Platform(s): Amiga
- Release: WW: January, 1994
- Genre(s): Simulation

Fighter Duel Pro 2 is a 1994 video game published by American studio Jaeger Software for the Amiga.

== Gameplay ==
Title screen

Fighter Duel Pro 2 is a flight simulator with SVGA-quality graphics and flight models.

== Reception ==
In 1996, Computer Gaming World declared Fighter Duel Pro 2 the 118th-best computer game ever released.
