= Antago =

1990 video game

- Cover art
- Publisher(s): Art of Dreams
- Platform(s): Amiga, Atari ST
- Release: 1990
- Genre(s): Puzzle
- Mode(s): Single-player

Antago is a puzzle video game released in 1990 by Art of Dreams for the Amiga and Atari ST.
