= Preventice =

American software company

Preventice, Inc.
- Type: Private company
- Industry: mHealth
- Founded: 2007; 19 years ago
- Founder: Jonathan Otterstatter; Scott Burrichter; Greg Wobig; Dan Spors
- Headquarters: Rochester, Minnesota, United States
- Key people: Jonathan Otterstatter (CEO)
- Website: www.preventice.com

Preventice, Inc., formerly known as Boost Information Systems, Inc., was founded in 2007 by Jonathan Otterstatter, Scott Burrichter, Greg Wobig, and Dan Spors. The company is headquartered in Rochester, Minnesota.

== Overview ==
The company develops mobile to cloud-based health technologies for smartphone, tablets, and the web. Through collaborations with Merck, Mayo Clinic, and Pfizer the company has released close to 40 applications for prescription medication management, cardiac care, sleep apnea, and diabetes management.

In August 2012, the U.S. Food and Drug Administration approved the BodyGuardian Remote Monitoring System, a series of small wearable monitors created by Preventice in collaboration with the Mayo Clinic. The BodyGuardian system is to be used by doctors to track non-lethal arrhythmia or irregular heartbeats in ambulatory patients. The monitors are paired with a dedicated cell phone that allows doctors to check on a patient's heart rate at any time through a secure web site on their computers or via their iPad tablets.
