= Aunt Arctic Adventure =

1988 video game by Mindware

- Publisher: Mindware
- Platform: Amiga
- Release: 1988
- Genre: Platform

Aunt Arctic Adventure is a platform game released in 1988 by Mindware for the Amiga. The player guides Charlie the chimp through the various levels to rescue his aunt, who was kidnapped and taken to the Arctic to work as a circus performer.

== Gameplay ==
The game can be played by one or two players. If two, the second player controls Penguin Pete. Actual gameplay involves picking up bananas and treasures to earn extra points while avoiding enemies such as Eskimos, spiders, and penguins, as well as traps like pitfalls, flying daggers and axes, and burning floors. A handful of levels have additional challenges, such as reduced/absent lighting, and traps disguised as sections of wall that are tripped by the player.

Aunt Arctic Adventure has 50 levels. The levels include things such as invisible walls, ropes and ladders to climb on, hurdles to jump, etc. Completing the game requires logic and puzzle-solving skills as well as fast reflexes. Generally, the game was divided into "sets" of four levels each, which shared the same music (except for levels without a music trigger) and enemies, and the fourth level of a set was usually arranged as an obstacle course that was more straightforward, but deadlier.

== Reception ==
Info gave the game 4 stars and said "The graphics are almost too cute, and the music is bright and snappy. Joystick control is smooth, and the scenery scrolls across and up and down seamlessly."
