= Breathless (video game) =

1995 video game

- Developer: Fields of Vision
- Publisher: Power Computing
- Designers: Alberto Longo; Pierpaolo Di Maio
- Programmer: Alberto Longo
- Artists: Gianluca Abbate; Lino Grandi
- Composers: Pierpaolo Di Maio; Tiziano Cappiello
- Platforms: Amiga 1200, Amiga 4000, CD32
- Release: 1995
- Genre: First-person shooter
- Mode: Single-player

Breathless is a first-person shooter released in 1995 for the Amiga 1200 developed by Fields of Vision and published by Power Computing. The game is set in a gladiatorial arena ran by alien overlords who have turned rebelling humans into cyborgs, featuring twenty levels that feature maps of varying height and the player seeking keycards or pressing switches to progress. Breathless received generally positive notices in the Amiga press, following several previews and demos being released. The game was later ported to the Amiga CD32 in 2014. The game's source code was released in 2017, leading to projects to port the game to modern PCs.

== See also ==
- Cytadela
- Behind the Iron Gate
- Fears
- Gloom
- Alien Breed 3D
- Testament
