= Crazy Sue Goes On =

1992 Commodore Amiga video game

- Publisher(s): MC Publications
- Designer(s): Hironymus Jumpshoe
- Artist(s): DJ Braincrack
- Composer(s): MC Mad Brush
- Platform(s): Amiga
- Release: 1992
- Genre(s): Platform
- Mode(s): Single-player

Crazy Sue Goes On, also known as Crazy Sue 2 and Crazy Sue II, is a 2D platform game for the Amiga which is the sequel to Crazy Sue, in which the player again takes the role of the little girl named Crazy Sue, and must defeat the wife of the evil Wizard of Doom whom she defeated in the first game.

== Gameplay ==
Gameplay screenshot

The gameplay is almost unmodified from Crazy Sue, but levels got bigger and more complicated, however there still is only horizontal scrolling. Some differences are in level design. The player often has to go back to locations, and climb around in large levels. There also are some timed power-ups which can be activated at special locations (something which did not exist in the first game).

The game's story connects directly to Crazy Sue. The Wizard of Doom has been destroyed, but now his wife, the Mistress of Death, put a horrible curse on the kingdom of Ereanor and kidnapped Sue's teddy bear. Therefore, Crazy Sue sets out once again to fight the forces of evil.

The game has only four levels, as compared to 10 in the first game. They are considerably larger and less linear though, so the game has about the same length overall. In the first level, Crazy Sue arrives at the castle of the Mistress of Death, and has to use speed scrolls in order to not run out of time. In levels two and three she has to fight through the castle and library. In level four she enters the sewers to reach the place of the final battle.

After defeating the Mistress of Death, a message mentions "her uncle Ice Death, but that's another story" - suggesting that a third Crazy Sue was planned, with a third relative of the bad guys' family as villain, but such a game never was released.

== Release and reception ==
Crazy Sue Goes On was first released in 1992 as cover disk of the Amiga Mania magazine by MC Publications in the UK and in the Amiga Fun magazine by CompuTec Verla in Germany. Amiga Joker gave the game a review score of 60%.
