= Graphic Adventure Creator =

Adventure game creation system released in 1985

- Graphic Adventure Creator for the C64
- Developers: Sean Ellis, Brendan Kelly, Dave Kirby, "The Kid"
- Publisher: Incentive Software
- Designer: Sean Ellis
- Platforms: ZX Spectrum, Amstrad CPC, Commodore 64, BBC Micro
- Release: 1985
- Genres: Game creation system, utility
- Mode: n/a

Graphic Adventure Creator (often shortened to GAC) is a game creation system/programming language for adventure games published by Incentive Software, originally written on the Amstrad CPC by Sean Ellis, and then ported to other platforms by, amongst others, Brendan Kelly (Spectrum), Dave Kirby (BBC, Electron) and "The Kid" (Malcolm Hellon) (C64). The pictures in the demo adventure, Ransom, were made by Pete James and the box cover art by Pete Carter.

GAC was released in 1985 for the Amstrad CPC and in 1986 for the ZX Spectrum, Commodore 64 and BBC Micro. A simplified version without graphics, called just the Adventure Creator, was also released for the Acorn Electron in 1987. GAC was ported to the Atari ST in 1988 as ST Adventure Creator (STAC) by the original author.

GAC had a more advanced parser than The Quill, allowing commands like GET THE LAMP THEN LIGHT IT, and a built-in graphics editor. Over 300 titles were written using GAC. It also came with a built in text compressor.

== Reception ==
GAC was well received, earning a Zzap! Gold Medal Award and a Crash Smash. Your Sinclair reviewed the ZX Spectrum version giving it a 9/10 score. The ST version reached number 18 on the bestsellers chart in August 1988.

== See also ==
- The Quill, another common text adventure engine
