= Scetlander =

Scetlander (later known as Lander Software) was a software publisher which released titles for various 8- and 16-bit home computer systems in the 1980s and 1990s.

== Games ==
Gold Series
- Genre: Edutainment
- Developer: Scetlander
- Publisher: Scetlander
- Platforms: Amiga, Atari ST, Commodore 64, MS-DOS, Windows, ZX Spectrum
- First release: 1989

Gold Series is a collection of educational games for the ZX Spectrum designed to make learning English and maths fun and easy. The games were then ported other various computers including Atari ST, Amiga, and Commodore 64 and MS-DOS. Each game focuses on a particular topic. The games can have their difficulty settings set to suit a player's skill, and cater for various age groups.

The Amiga and Atari ST versions were programmed by Terence Anthony Mancey.

=== Mix and Match ===
This game was created in 1988 for MS-DOS, coded by David Jolliff. It was ported to the BBC Micro in 1990 and ported to ZX Spectrum, Atari ST and Amiga in 1991. The technical editor of the game was Cliff Johnson. It is aimed to teach children under 5 years how match different objects together aided by the sea serpent Maggie. It also came with a Maggie badge in the pack along with a manual. The game is divided into four game types including "Two of a Kind", "Odd one Out", "Forget-me-not" and "Clock + Calendar". Each of those types (except the Calendar) have six activities: pictures, shapes, same, large, small, and numbers.

The game was also translated into the Belgian language on the Belgian Ministry of Education's behalf.

Mix and Match

Review scores
Publication	Score
Sinclair User	79% (ZX Spectrum); 77% (ZX Spectrum)
ST Format	37% (Atari ST)

=== Count and Add ===
This game was designed for the ZX Spectrum in 1992 and was ported to the Atari ST the same year. The game is aimed to teach children how to count objects and add them together aided by Shades the dog. There are six activities:

- Sets 1 - player counts the objects on the screen.
- Sets 2 - player types the number of objects to require and then reveal them.
- Animals - player counts scattered objects on the screen.
- Train - player counts two different sets of objects and adds them together.
- Spider - players do additional sums before the spider reaches the butterfly.
- Clock - player tells the time on the clock.
Count and Add

Review scores
Publication	Score
Sinclair User	78% (ZX Spectrum)
Your Sinclair	7/10 (ZX Spectrum)
Atari ST Review	4/5 (Atari ST)
ST Format	8.25/10 (Atari ST)

=== Hooray for Henrietta ===
This game is aimed to teach children aged 5–12 mathematics, including addition, subtraction, multiplication and division. It was created in 1989 by T.R. Tulloch for MS-DOS and ported to ZX Spectrum in 1990. The object of the game is to help the protagonist Henrietta save her trouble prone boyfriend Henry and recover his wedding clothes which have been stolen by the parrot John. In each maths activity, the player has a limited time to solve a number of problems before John can cover Henrietta in cold custard.

The game is the first to be produced as joint project with the Scottish Council for Education and Training. It also came with a John the Parrot badge and a guide for configuring and running the game.

In 1996 the game was remade for Windows, with 3D graphics and high quality sound and music.

Hooray for Henrietta

Review scores
Publication	Score
Crash	78% (ZX Spectrum)
Sinclair User	80% (ZX Spectrum); 81% (ZX Spectrum)
CU Amiga	7/10 (Amiga)

=== Henrietta's Book of Spells ===
This game aims to teach children aged 7–14 language skills. It was created in 1989 by T. R. Tulloch for Archimedes A3000, Commodore 64 and MS-DOS. The game was ported to ZX Spectrum and Amiga in 1990 and ported to Atari ST in 1991. The object of the game is to help the protagonist Henrietta undo Morgana the Morbid's spell which turned her husband Henry into a frog. The difficulty of the game can be adjusted from five to nine letter words. Each activity earns the player a letter. Activities include:

- Flash - player has to memorise a word then type it in.
- Complete - player has to fill the gaps of a word with correct vowels.
- Crack-It - player has to decipher substituted letters.
- Hangman - player has to guess correct letters with a limited number of tries.
- Jumble - player has to crack an anagram of jumbled letters into a proper word.

After all five letters have been collected, the player must do a final Word Jumble to break Morgana's spell. The game was written in the STOS language by David Jolliff but was written in the AMOS language for the Amiga. In 1996 the game was remade for Windows with 3D graphics and using five different languages, including English, Spanish, French, German and Italian.

Henrietta's Book of Spells

Review scores
Publication	Score
Crash	75% (ZX Spectrum)
Sinclair User	78% (ZX Spectrum); 84% (ZX Spectrum)

=== Spellbound ===
This game, designed by William Cochrane with graphics by Donald Anderson, teaches children spelling. Unlike the other games it has the platform of an arcade game. The object of the game is to guide a helicopter (in one level a submarine) driven by Hal through five levels while shooting Professor Grime's robots. In each level the player needs to collect all the letters that make up the goal word from the robots. After the winning a level the player must retype the goal word twice. The levels consist of Underground, Underwater, Downtown, North Pole and Space Base.

== Other ==
In addition to the Gold Series Scetlander developed a number of other games, mostly for the BBC Micro computer.

Game	Genre/Topic(s)	Year	Platform(s)	Notes
A Pathway to Bearings	Mathematics, Navigation	1990	BBC Micro	
A Walk Around the Zoo	Navigation	1990	BBC Micro, Archimedes A3000	
Airline Reservation Package	Business Studies, Information Technology	1988	Archimedes 305, Archimedes 400	
Basic Mathematics	Mathematics	1988	ZX Spectrum	
Bearings Suite A	Navigation, Mathematics	1988	Archimedes 305, Archimedes 400	Consists of "Left or Right", "Playpark" and "A Walk Around the Zoo".
Bearings Suite B	Navigation, Mathematics	1988	Archimedes 400	
Bearings Suite C	Navigation, Mathematics	1988	Archimedes 400	
Care Hire	Information Technology, Business Studies, Environmental Studies	1988	Archimedes 305, Archimedes 400	
Carrigan Street	Simulation	1990	BBC Micro	
Catch	Business/Fishing Simulation	1988, 1990	BBC Micro, Archimedes A3000, Archimedes 305, Archimedes 400	
Cell Growth	Biology	1988	ZX Spectrum	
Comal Demons	English	1988	Archimedes 400	
Compass Points	Navigation	1990	BBC Micro	
Counting and Adding	Mathematics	1990	BBC Micro	
Cycling	Road Safety	1988	ZX Spectrum	
Datafile	Database editing	1988	Archimedes 305	
Forest	Economics, Ecology	1990	BBC Micro	
Historical Farming	Simulation, History	1990	BBC Micro	
Holiday	Language, Environmental Studies	1988	ZX Spectrum, Archimedes 305, Archimedes 400	
Housebuilder	Simulation, Construction	1988	ZX Spectrum	
Journey	Navigation	1988	BBC Micro	
King of the Jungle	Safari	1990	BBC Micro	
Know Your Compass Points	Navigation	1990	BBC Micro	
Left or Right	Navigation	1990	BBC Micro, Archimedes A3000	
Mapmaster	Navigation, Cartography	1990	BBC Micro	
Matrix	Databases, English	1990	BBC Micro	A touch screen and an overlay keyboard could be applied.
Mazemaster	Puzzle	1988	Archimedes 400	
New Community Suite	Simulation, Economics	1990	BBC Micro	
The New Community	Environmental Studies	1988	ZX Spectrum	
Pathfinder	Navigation	1990	BBC Micro	
Playpark	Navigation	1990	BBC Micro, Archimedes A3000	
Predictype	Word Processing	1985	Acorn RISC	
Project Space	English	1990	BBC Micro, MS-DOS	An audio cassette was provided.
Radar	Navigation, Flight Simulation	1990	BBC Micro	
Snapshot	Environmental Studies	1988, 1990	ZX Spectrum, BBC Micro	Available for BBC Master 128 only.
Stock Control Simulation	Business Studies	1988	Archimedes 305, Archimedes 400	
Weather	Weather Forecasting	1990	BBC Micro, MS-DOS	Additional features in DOS version.

== Re-release ==
In 1994 WizardWorks re-released updated remakes of the two Henrietta games on CD.

In 1995 Lander Software released a "Lander Gold" CD compiling four games remade with 256 colour VGA graphics, mouse compatibility digitised sound and music. The CD included "Hooray for Henrietta", "Henrietta's Book of Spells", "Count and Add" and "Spellbound".
