= Black Gold (video game) =

1989 video game

- Developer: reLINE Software
- Publishers: reLINE Software; Rainbow Arts
- Platforms: Amiga, Atari ST, Commodore 64, MS-DOS
- Release: 1989
- Genre: Business simulation
- Modes: Single-player, multiplayer

Black Gold (also known as Oil Imperium) is a business simulation game released in 1989 by reLINE Software.

== Gameplay ==
The goal of the game is to promote and sell oil and defeat competitors using a number of fair and unfair strategies. A game move always takes a month, and each action in the game costs one or more days.

The game is designed for four players, either human (using a hot seat method) or computer-controlled. Players take on the management of one of four corporations: "Interoil", "All American", "Transoil" or "Explora Inc."

There are four different game objectives to choose from: to play a three-year game, to survive the longest of all the game companies, to receive an 80% market share or to reach 60 million dollars. There are some game mechanic variations between the missions. For example, when playing to the first 60 million dollars, drilling a borehole takes longer than in the other missions.

There are eight oil-producing regions to choose from where players must acquire licenses, tankers and oil fields: Alaska, North America, Central America, South America, Europe, USSR, the Gulf region and Indochina.

The player can request an expert opinion of an oil field's probable yield before purchase. Once a field has been bought, the player may drill manually or pay game money for automatic drilling. Enemies in the game can disrupt play using sabotage. This can be done by igniting the oil fields, destroying tankers, manipulating balance sheets, etc. To protect against such moves, a player can hire a security company.

In the course of the game there are three action sequences. Oil sales can lead to delays, and the player must manually lay pipeline. Manual drilling requires the player to correct the deviation of the drill head. Finally, burning oil wells must be extinguished using dynamite. The latter can be carried out by a specialist called Ted Redhair (inspired by the famous Red Adair).

== Reception ==
Kevin Warne reviewed Oil Imperium for Games International magazine, and gave it 2 stars out of 5, and stated that "it has the potential to be a good game, but after five fruitless attempts to get anything going at all they've used up all my goodwill and patience. At the very best this is strictly for those who really like these kind of games and are prepared for the hard work involved".

== Reviews ==
- Games Preview (August 1989)
- Amiga User International (October 1989)
- Commodore User (November 1989)
- Joystick (German) (August 1989)
- Commodore User (September 1989)
- Zero (November 1989)
- ACE (Advanced Computer Entertainment) (October 1989)
- Amiga Computing (November 1989)
- Atari ST User (December 1989)
- Your Amiga (October 1989)
- ASM (Aktueller Software Markt) (October 1989)
- ASM (Aktueller Software Markt) (May 1989)
- Joker Verlag präsentiert: Sonderheft (1993)
- Joker Verlag präsentiert: Sonderheft (1994)
- Power Play (1989)
- Power Play (July 1989)
- Amiga Format (October 1989)
- Amiga Action (October 1989)
- Power Play (December 1991)
