= Cytron =

1992 video game

- Developer: Lunatic Software
- Publisher: Psygnosis
- Platform: Amiga
- Release: 1992
- Genre: Action-adventure

Cytron is a video game developed by Lunatic Software for the Amiga and published by Psygnosis in 1992.

== Gameplay ==
The first level

Cytron is a futuristic Gauntlet-type maze action/adventure game. The story tells that on a distant research facility, the robots serving the researchers have gone haywire and have taken the researchers hostage. Earth sends a remote-controlled robot called Cytron to rescue the researchers.

The player controls Cytron either with a joystick or a mouse. A novel idea is that Cytron is able to split into two smaller robots, Cyt and Ron, which can be controlled individually, and later joined again. Both Cyt, Ron and Cytron can use various weapons, and there are computer terminals in various places in the mazes, allowing access to various facilities.
