= Alien Breed 3D =

1995 video game

- Box art by Kevin Jenkins
- Developer: Team17
- Publisher: Ocean Software
- Director: Martyn Brown
- Producer: Kenny Grant
- Programmer: Andy Clitheroe
- Composer: Bjørn Lynne
- Series: Alien Breed
- Platforms: Amiga, CD32
- Release: EU: October 1995
- Genre: First-person shooter
- Modes: Single-player, multiplayer

Alien Breed 3D is a first-person shooter video game developed by Team17 and published by Ocean Software for the Amiga in 1995. It is the fourth installment in the Alien Breed franchise, a series of science fiction-themed shooters, and the first to use a first-person perspective.

Set on a fictional planet, the player's character, Captain J. T. Reynolds, enters a military base that has been overrun by a genetically engineered breed of aliens, which have escaped the base's laboratory, killing everyone there but Reynolds. While venturing across various sites of the base as he seeks a means of escape, he is forced to fend off the aliens on his own for his survival, using a range of weaponry at his disposal.

Team17 initially conceived of a three-dimensional Alien Breed game for MS-DOS computers, but ruled out the idea in the wake of id Software's new first-person shooter, Doom. It was brought to fruition when Andy Clitheroe, a mathematics student from the University of York, demonstrated a demo of his 3D engine running on an Amiga computer. Clitheroe became the project's sole programmer, and was not joined by anyone involved in the previous Alien Breed games. Only one person, composer Bjørn Lynne, had any prior involvement in a Team17 project.

The game was released to a generally favorable reception, with some reviewers regarding it as the best "Doom clone" for the Amiga, although reactions to its departure from the Alien Breed series' style of gameplay by fans were ambivalent. Critics praised the game's atmosphere and level architecture, in particular the inclusion of layered storeys and underwater areas, although the graphics were criticised for appearing pixelated, as was the lack of automap. The game's two-player deathmatch garnered mixed appraisals. The game was followed by a sequel, Alien Breed 3D II: The Killing Grounds, in 1996.

== Gameplay ==
The player fights an enemy using a grenade launcher. From the top left, the UI includes a health meter, a meter showing the amount of ammunition for the current weapon, and squares indicating which of the four coloured keys have been collected, which light up when so.

Alien Breed 3D is a first-person shooter in which the player fights their way through a military base on a fictional planet that has become infested with hostile aliens, with the goal being to reach the base's shuttle and escape. Across the game's 16 levels, the player must utilise their arsenal of weapons to kill the aliens, which include red doglike creatures, various gunned aliens, a class of hovering aliens, and "tree creatures who spawn flying eyeballs". The player begins the game with a pulse rifle, and four others, a double-barrelled pump-action shotgun, a plasma gun, a grenade launcher, and a rocket launcher, must be located and picked up. The player must also find supplies of ammunition to replenish their respective weapons' stocks. As the player progresses, their character may sustain damage. Picking up a health kit heals the character.

The game has maps of varying depths with platforms and floors above others, something the Doom engine was not capable of.

It is possible to switch to switch between the full-screen and the default one-third screen sizes by pressing Numpad 0 on the keyboard, with UI elements removed in full-screen mode. A null modem multiplayer mode exists wherein two Amiga machines or CD32 consoles are linked via the serial port. Two players fight each other in a deathmatch battle until one of them is killed. The battles are set in the same levels as single-player mode, except that all doors are unlocked and there are no monsters.

== Plot ==
Osiris III's commanding officer, Captain J. T. Reynolds contacts Earth Defense Force General R.E. Grant reporting how the secret Project Osiris has slipped out of scientists' hands: attempts have been made to cultivate the alien eggs found in Azirin by cloning them and combining with human DNA, leading to remarkable results, but due to system failures, the Breed has been unleashed and killed people at the research station. In the message, Reynolds announces that he has found weapons and other supplies in a decommissioned observatory and plans to return to the base to find an escape route from the planet and possibly destroy the Breed's source in the meantime before his own oxygen supplies dwindle.

== Development ==
Team17, a British game developer and publisher known for its Alien Breed series, considered 3D follow-up instead of the top-down view of its predecessors. It was planned to be MS-DOS-only, but the arrival of id Software's Doom led to the team not pursuing its development. The origins of Alien Breed 3D can be traced back to the University of York, where Andy Clitheroe, then a mathematics student, observed his peers being impressed by Doom. This included Clitheroe's girlfriend, his future wife Jackie, who was introduced to the game by a friend who bought a copy. Clitheroe sought to impress her by attempting a take on the popular shooter.

A friend of Clitheroe reverse engineered a demo to create an algorithm that would emulate a number-per-pixel mode on Amiga 1200, which relied on planar graphics for display. Number-per-pixel algorithms were favoured by other Doom clones for the Amiga for the convenience of changing the colour of each individual pixel, and Clitheroe used his friend's technique to create a first-person engine by himself. By chance, Team17's creative director, Martyn Brown, read a message on the Internet by the York student about his engine, which, at the latter's girlfriend's pressing, was then demonstrated in the company's offices on an Amiga computer. Brown became convinced that a clone of Doom for the Amiga could be made, and Team17 immediately hired Clitheroe and acquired his engine. Team17's co-founder Martyn Brown soon telephoned id Software's John Carmack for the licencing rights to Doom for the Amiga, but Carmack turned down the offer, asserting in Brown's words, "Technically, it can’t be done; you can't do a first-person shooter on the Amiga." Team17 thus decided that their engine should morph into a project for the first three-dimensional Alien Breed game.

The game's producer, Kenny Grant, who in early 1995 had seen nearly all Doom clones released for Amiga, stated that Team17 sought to avoid mistakes made by developers of those shooters. Playability and character movement were emphasised, which Grant himself found to be poor in the shooters. Clitheroe was the game's sole programmer, and Mike Green and Charles Blessing, two friends he brought over from his university in York, would aid him in the game's art and some of the editor code, with Blessing being credited as the game's 3D object designer, Green with designing the alien graphics, and both as level designers. Not one person involved in the previous Alien Breed games' development worked on Alien Breed 3D, and only one person, Worms composer Bjørn Lynne, had any prior involvement in a Team17 game project. Notably, features characteristic of the series, such as weapon shops, were left out.

In early 1995, Team17 secured a deal with publisher Ocean Software where the latter would distribute Team17's games, including Alien Breed 3D for Amiga AGA machines (i.e. the Amiga 1200/4000) and a CD-ROM version for the CD32. The game was released as Alien Breed 3D in October 1995 for those formats. The CD-ROM version features a soundtrack composed by Bjørn Lynne. That version's box claimed that it contained more levels than the desktop Amiga version, but no evidence exists supporting the statement. To deter piracy, a copy protection scheme was put in place where a codebook was provided consisting of black varnish printed on black paper, one of which was needed to play the game. However, The Escapist reports that the codes were easier to read after they had been photocopied.

Team17 released the source code for Alien Breed 3D and its sequel, Alien Breed 3D II: The Killing Grounds, for personal use on the March 1997 cover CD of Amiga Format.

== Reception ==
Reception

Review scores
Publication	Score
Amiga Computing	91% (AMI)
Amiga Format	93% (AMI)
Amiga Power	91% (AMI)
GamePro	88% (AMI)
GamesMaster	79% (AMI)
Amiga CD32 Gamer	91% (CD32)
CU Amiga	93% (AMI); 86% (CD32)
The One	94% (AMI)

According to data from the European Leisure Software Publishers Association, in its first month, the game was the second-best-selling full-price Amiga game, behind Team17's own Worms. It was also the best-selling Amiga 1200 game for four consecutive months, and the CD32 version peaked as the second-best-selling game for the console, also behind Worms. According to Martyn Brown, by February 1996, the game sold 11,000–12,000 copies, with 15 per cent being for the CD32.

Alien Breed 3D was released to generally favourable reviews. Reviewers widely compared its gameplay to Doom, with some calling it the best Doom clone for Amiga. One such reviewer was for GamePro, who praised the level design and their inclusion of stairs and lifts, but found the graphics to be pixelated sometimes, while noting that the game is best played with a graphics accelerator. Amiga Format called it one of the best Amiga games of all time, praising the frantic gameplay and writing that it underscores the potential of the Amiga 1200. The One lauded the monster design and the combination of graphics and sound effects to create a frightening atmosphere, stating, "It is the best of the Doom clones on the Amiga A1200 by far, and is far more like Doom than any of the others."

CU Amiga praised the level architecture for including layered storeys and underwater areas, the visual effects such as those used for water, and deemed the multiplayer mode "probably the best two player combat game on Amiga." Amiga Computing praised the plot and found the game to be challenging enough, while cautioning that it should only be played on an Amiga machine expanded with a graphics accelerator for a smooth frame rate. Amiga Power believed that having a wholly different set of people develop Alien Breed 3D benefitted the game's quality, but the magazine criticised the lack of a map and the inability to look up and down, and the low level total of 16. Regarding the multiplayer mode, it criticised the two-player deathmatch mode and directly refuted the box's claim that the game supported a cooperative mode. GamesMaster offered a more modest appraisal; while more favourable to the game than to Fears, it criticised the graphical detail, controls, and difficulty and believed that the game was an overambitious attempt to create the definitive Doom-clone for the Amiga that did not live up to the hype, ultimately preferring Gloom.

Regarding the CD32 release, Amiga Format alluded to the advantage of Marathon, a first-person shooter for the Macintosh, of letting players look up and down. It metaphorically describing Alien Breed 3D as having had its wings clipped to limit its flight height, but favourably factored in the value of the game against the console's greatly lower price compared to the Macintosh, and praised the soundtrack. Amiga CD32 Gamer found the viewing screen size to be small and the game's rendering of 3D graphics particularly taxing on the console, but was sparing in its criticism of the graphics, praised the sound effects, and called the game "immensely addictive." CU Amiga considered the CD32 release to be shovelware in that it was ported from the Amiga with little effort put into utilising the CD-ROM's potential. It also took issue with the serial cable requirement for the multiplayer mode, citing low demand for the cable, and criticised the copy protection scheme and the low game speed that cannot be improved with an accelerator, an upgrade that is impossible on the CD32. However, it praised the version's compatibility with Amiga 1200 computers.

Despite its critical success, the game's departure from the Alien Breed series' formula of gameplay was met with mixed fan reactions. Retro Gamer largely attributes it to the 2D games "bombard[ing] the player with waves of enemies", compared to a small number of enemies appearing on the screen at a time in Alien Breed 3D. The magazine also cites the multiplayer mode, which in the 3D version lacks enemies and has all doors open. The game was ranked the 12th best game of all time by Amiga Power. The game's engine was nominated for the Technical Innovation of the Year award at the 1996 Golden Joystick Awards. Retro Gamer listed Alien Breed 3D as one of the "Perfect Ten Games" for the Amiga 1200. While dismissing the screen size as "dreadfully annoying", it concluded that "the finely structured level design, stunning visuals and gruesome deaths delivered a Doom-like experience that many felt the Amiga could never achieve."

== Legacy ==
Soon after the game's release, Clitheroe resumed work as the programmer for a sequel, Alien Breed 3D II: The Killing Grounds. It was released in July 1996.

Retro Gamer described how Alien Breed 3D inspired other developers to attempt their own Doom clone for the Amiga, including Breathless and Genetic Species, which benefitted from third-party peripherals such as external CD-ROM drives and expansion cards with additional RAM and more powerful processors that were retailed until around 1998, despite Commodore International's 1994 demise. The expansion cards were so powerful that the Amiga saw the release of a faithful conversion of Quake.

Alien Breed 3D reappeared as one of the 25 games compiled for the A500 Mini console, released in 2022. It was also remade by a fan in 2021 as Project Osiris, which uses the GZDoom engine.

== See also ==
- Breathless (video game)
- Behind the Iron Gate
- Cytadela (video game)
- Fears (video game)
- Gloom (video game)
- Testament (video game)
