= Amegas =

1987 video game

- Developer: Guido Bartels
- Publisher: reLINE Software
- Platform: Amiga
- Release: 1987

Amegas is a video game clone of Arkanoid written by Guido Bartels for the Amiga and published by reLINE Software in 1987. In Australia the game was published by Ozisoft.

== Gameplay ==
The player controls a paddle, situated at the bottom of the screen. The paddle can only be moved horizontally, and is used to stop the ball leaving the bottom of the screen. Should the ball leave the bottom of the screen, the player loses a life, and the ball is reset on the paddle. Every time the ball hits a brick, the brick disappears. When the player has destroyed all the bricks in a round, he or she will progress to the next round, and a new wall of bricks will be produced. The patterns the bricks are laid out in varies from round to round. Sometimes, upon the ball colliding with a brick, the brick will fall and can be collected by the paddle to produce a bonus for the player. The bonus the player receives depends upon the color of the brick which has fallen.

The game varies from its inspiration, Arkanoid, in a couple of ways. Firstly, the screen is much larger, and on most levels, there are a significantly increased number of bricks to destroy. Secondly, the bricks do not fall randomly; a small black dot on a brick denotes that it will fall if hit by the ball.
