= Final Countdown (video game) =

1990 video game

- Developer: Demonware Softwarehaus
- Publisher: Demonware Softwarehaus
- Producer: Will Weber
- Designers: Kurt Cotoaga; Andreas Herbst
- Artists: Boris Kunkel; Jörg Ritter
- Composer: Torsten Gellrich
- Platform: Amiga
- Release: 1990
- Genre: Action game
- Mode: Single-player

Final Countdown is a side-scrolling action-adventure game developed and published by Demonware Softwarehaus for the Amiga, and released in 1990. The game is set in the 25th century, and sees players taking on the role of a female space station commander who boards an asteroid-like space ship to investigate it after it is found to be on a collision course for Earth, navigating around and dealing with various hazards and hostile robots along their way.

== Gameplay ==
Players take on the role of a female space commander who must explore various levels of an alien spaceship (disguised as an asteroid). Each level is divided into three floors, and differ in obstacles, hostile robots and other hazards, with special teleporters that are used to switch between levels. To navigate around the levels, players can walk where possible, and use a jetpack to move between floors - if a lift is not available to do so - as well as to cross gaps and avoid certain hazards like active mines. Using the jetpack consumes fuel, which can only be replenished by picking up energy cells scattered around the level. Along with hazards, each level comes with a variety of robots - while some are peaceful, others will kill the player or trigger a ship-wide alarm. For hostile robots, the player can make use of energy doors to control where they operate, alcoves to get past them, or set down mines to destroy them - these can be acquired in levels in an inactive form; once set down, they can be picked up before they activate.

Computer consoles found in levels can be interacted with - these require text commands to operate, such as "SHOW IMAGE" or "TYPE FILE", with the player able to use computers to either read documents, view image files, or activate and deactivate certain lifts, robots and doors. Some actions are security locked, and the player is required to find the right code to avoid triggering an alarm. The player will respawn in a level if they touch a hazard or hostile robot, but this will consume mission time in doing so. The game is over if they trigger the ship's alarm or take too long to complete the game.

== Synopsis ==
In the year 2437AD, an asteroid is detected entering the Solar System, near to Pluto. An orbital communication facility, designated Tercom I, attempts to scan the asteroid, but its onboard AI computer systems determine it is not a natural object, after all efforts to investigate it remotely are thwarted by an unknown entity. Deciding to investigate themselves, Tercom I's commanding officer, Laira Tyrik, teleports to the asteroid's interior. Once aboard, she discover the asteroid is in fact an alien ship, which is slowly entering a collision course with Earth and is equipped with powerful weapons technology that could destroy not only the planet, but the Solar System as well.

To prevent this, Laira explores the ship, dealing with hazards and alien robots, whilst carefully interacting with the ship's computer, effectively deactivating systems and setting it on a course that will leave the system.

== Reception ==
Final Countdown received mixed but mostly positive reviews, including 75% and 76% in Amiga Action, 70% in Amiga Format, 81% in Amiga Joker, 6/10 in Datormagazin, and 32% in PowerPlay.
