= Fate: Gates of Dawn =

1991 video game

- Cover art
- Developer: reLINE Software
- Publisher: reLINE Software
- Platforms: Amiga, Atari ST
- Release: 1991: Amiga; 1992: Atari ST
- Genre: Role-playing video game
- Mode: Single-player

Fate: Gates of Dawn is a role-playing video game released by reLINE Software in 1991 for the Amiga and in 1992 for the Atari ST.

== Story ==
Winwood, a proud owner of a small record shop on Fifth Street, is kidnapped by an evil wizard into a parallel medieval fantasy world and has to find his way back.

Screenshot of Fate: Gates of Dawn showing Winwood

== Features ==
The game is viewed from first-person perspective and notable for its huge game world. It takes hours for the player to travel from one end of the game world to the other and up to months to complete the game. It includes an overworld with 4 towns and some smaller villages, a wilderness split by a mountain range and over 200 islands. It also features an underworld with nine dungeons with up to seven levels apiece.

The player can control up to 4 parties, 28 characters in total. Some quests are thereby only solvable by teamwork. Characters are not created by the player but have to be invited to join the group. There are hundreds of NPCs with their own personalities and AI. The game has 32 character-classes, 11 races and over 200 magic spells and potions. It features a realistic environment including day and night cycles and weather which affects the characters.

== Background ==
The development of the game began in 1986. Although mentioned in the manual, a PC version was never released because of the bankruptcy of the game company. Only a few original English versions were sold for the same reason. Copies nevertheless spread all over the world. Today the game is freeware with permission of the creator of the game. It can be downloaded legally, for example on RuneTek98's site or on Mightandmagicboard.de.

It is notable that from these copies of the game the copy protection but not the password protection was removed. Password requests are not made at the start of the game but at intervals in the game repeated after some time. Just ignoring these requests or a wrong answer leads not to an abrupt end to the game, but gameplay deteriorating until it becomes unplayable. Therefore, a copy of the manual is still required for the right code.

The Amiga version of the game has better sound quality and 32 colors compared to the Atari ST version with 16 colors. The game makes use of a strong compression algorithm to fit on only two 880 Kilobyte floppy discs. Nudity of the German version was self-censored in the English release.

Screenshots of the game from the self-censored English version (left) and the uncensored German version (right)

== Reception ==
The game received awards e.g. an Amiga Joker but was not a commercial success, the company reLINE failing for the first time just when the English version was about to be published.

Amiga Joker: 88%
Amiga Power: 70%
Amiga Format: 77%
Amiga Mania: 81%
Australian Commodore and Amiga Review: 94%
CU Amiga: 70%
Games-X 20: 4/5
Génération 4: 81%
MegaZone: 70%
