= Better Dead Than Alien =

1988 video game

- Developer(s): Oxford Digital Enterprises
- Publisher(s): Electra
- Platform(s): Amiga, Atari ST, Commodore 64, MS-DOS
- Release: Dec 1988
- Genre(s): Fixed shooter
- Mode(s): Single-player, Multiplayer

Better Dead Than Alien is a fixed shooter published in 1988 for the Amiga, Atari ST, Commodore 64 and MS-DOS by Electra.

A fixed shooter allowing some vertical movement, the player takes control of hero Brad Zoom's ship in his quest to save civilization from aliens. The game is full of humor and the intro screen is in magazine style.
