= Zombie Massacre (video game) =

1998 video game

- Developer: Alpha Software
- Publisher: Epic Marketing
- Composer: William Morton-
- Engine: Gloom
- Platform: Amiga
- Release: 1998
- Genre: First-person shooter
- Mode: Single-player

Zombie Massacre (working title of Gloom 3: The Director's Cut) is a 1998 video game produced by Alpha Software for the Amiga computer. It is a clone of the first-person shooter Doom.

== Production ==
Zombie Massacre's authors were proprietor of Alpha Software, Gareth Murfin, Dave Boaz‚ Dave Newton (coder)‚ Frank Wille with graphics by James Caygill‚ Jason Jordache‚ Liam Weford, Slawomir Stascheck and music by William Morton (musician). Working at a time when Amiga machines were being squeezed out of the market, Alpha Software produced one other game for the platform. Zombie Massacre was released as freeware in 2013. Following the 2017 release of the game engine's source code, a compatible source port for modern systems was created in 2020 called ZGloom.
