= ReLINE Software =

German video game company

- Industry: Video games
- Founded: 1987
- Founder: Uwe Grabosch, Holger Gehrmann
- Fate: Defunct
- Headquarters: Hannover, GER
- Area served: Worldwide

ReLINE Software was a German game development company founded by Uwe Grabosch and Holger Gehrmann in Hannover in 1987.

The company acted first as a developer for Softgold, Rainbow Arts, Golden Games, Magic Bytes, micro-partner, and Robtek; the company later became significantly more independent and co-published games with Magic Byte.

Titles from the eighties include: Operation Hongkong, Drum Studio, Extensor, Hollywood Poker, Space Port, Amegas, Crystal Hammer, Hollywood Poker Pro, Black Gold (also known as Oil Imperium), Dyter-07, and Window Wizard (also known as Window Willy).

Games of the early nineties include Legend of Faerghail, Fate: Gates of Dawn and Centerbase.

Holger Gehrmann and Olaf Patzenhauer continued reLINE Software as a software label in 1993. The games Biing! and Biing! 2 originated from this time. However, the planned development of Oil Imperium 2 was cancelled.

ReLINE Software closed in 2004. In February 2008, Holger Gehrmann fell to his death from a seven-story office building months before his 40th birthday. Olaf Patzenhauer died some time between late 2011 and mid-2012.
