= Warblade =

- Platforms: Windows, OS X, iOS
- Genre: Shooter

Warblade is a shareware computer game for Microsoft Windows and OS X, written by Norwegian developer Edgar M. Vigdal. It is also available for retail in the App Store for iOS devices (in iPhone/iPod Touch and iPad versions). The game is a 2D space shooter in the vein of the perennial classic Galaga. It is a rewrite and modernization of a popular Amiga shareware game, Deluxe Galaga, which was written by the same author back in the mid-1990s. Where technically possible, the graphics and sounds are respectful to their Amiga origins.

== Gameplay ==
The player controls a small ship, which moves along the bottom of the screen. An assembly of bug-like alien creatures fly onto the screen and shoot at the player's ship. The player must defeat all the aliens on the screen by shooting at them from the ship to advance to the next level. On defeating some aliens, random bonuses will be dropped for the player to collect, such as money, improved weaponry, or mini games.

=== Levels ===
Levels are made in packs of four, with each pack introducing a new alien design. The first two levels of a pack are levels containing only small aliens. The third level introduces larger versions of the aliens. When defeating a larger alien, there is the opportunity to collect a rank marker. When six different rank markers have been collected, the player advances a rank. The fourth and final level of the pack, alternates between a kamikaze level, in which aliens dive from above the screen, and a bonus level, in which the player earns a bonus if all aliens are defeated before they leave the screen area. Every 25 levels there is a boss level.

=== Shop ===
At the end of each pack, the player is taken to the shop where there is the option to purchase upgrades, such as extra lives and improved weapons.

=== Memorystation ===
A memorystation is one of two mini games that can be entered by collecting a falling bonus from an alien. The object of memorystation is to find pairs by turning over grid-like squares. If all pairs in a memorystation are found, the player receives bonus points and the next time a memorystation is entered there are more squares.

=== Meteor Storm ===
A meteor storm is the second mini game that can be entered by collecting a falling bonus from an alien. During a meteor storm, the player must navigate through falling rocks. Occasionally, money, points or gems can be collected that are also falling from the top of the screen. If the player reaches the end of the meteor storm, they are rewarded with a large number of points and amount of money.

=== Gem Drop ===
A gem drop is a third mini game that cannot be entered by collecting a bonus. The only way to enter a gem drop is to collect 100 gems, through the use of gem bombs, or collecting gems in memorystations and meteor storms. A gem drop is much like a meteor storm, however only gems fall, and they are worth large numbers of points. If the player collects 1000 gems in one game, a super gem drop is entered, where gems are worth 20 times what they are worth in usual gem drops.

== Legacy ==
In May 2007 it was revealed that Vigdal had begun planning a sequel to Warblade, dubbed Warblade II. On 19 December 2011, Vidgal revealed the new main screen design for the sequel, now titled Warblade MK II. The new game was to include a level editor, as well as completely redesigned graphics and levels. It was to be released for Windows, OS X, iOS and Android.

It was announced on the sequel's official Facebook page that on April 1, 2015, the creator of Warblade, Edgar Vigdal had died, casting the future of the sequel into doubt. It was later stated in the comment section to that post, that "as Edgar died and no-one can follow his code, yes, the project is not continuing."
