= 3D Construction Kit =

- Cover art
- Developer: Incentive Software
- Publishers: Domark, Incentive Software
- Programmers: Paul Gregory; Sean Ellis
- Artists: Eugene Messina; Chris Andrew; Ian Andrew; Kevin Parker
- Engine: Freescape
- Platforms: Acorn Archimedes, Amiga, Amstrad CPC, Atari ST, Commodore 64, MS-DOS, ZX Spectrum
- Release: EU: 29 May 1991
- Genre: Game creation system
- Mode: Single-player

3D Construction Kit (US, Canada and Israel release title: Virtual Reality Studio), also known as 3D Virtual Studio, is a utility for creating 3D worlds in Freescape. Developed by Incentive Software and published by Domark, it was released in 1991 on multiple platforms. The game originally retailed for £24.99 for the 8-bit version, and £49.99 for 16-bit version and the 32-bit Acorn Archimedes version, in the United Kingdom. A sequel, 3D Construction Kit II, was released in 1992, but only available on Amiga, Atari ST and MS-DOS.

== Features ==
Church created using 3D Construction Kit

Incentive Software had released games using the Freescape engine before, but with 3D Construction Kit, the company took the concept to a whole new level, giving users the ability to create their own worlds and games. In 3D Construction Kit, interaction with the world is usually limited to a cursor controlled with the keyboard, offering the possibility of interaction with nearby objects.

The kit has a very simple graphical user interface, allowing users to create and manipulate objects within the game's 3D environment. Primitives such as cubes, cuboids and pyramids can be easily created and edited to be scaled and placed on the 3D world. Colours can be selected for individual elements, making the free roaming worlds more varied and complex. The user-created virtual world is divided into areas, reducing the processing power required to render objects. The areas can be as large as the memory allows.

Animations may also be added to the primitives, either by looping or simple moving attributes to objects, to create simple, although seemingly advanced, animations.

In order to make games rather than worlds, 3D Construction Kit also allows for the addition of conditions, using the very simple-to-program Freescape Command Language (FCL). Sensors, animations and interactivity with the elements can be added with relative ease. Players are able to move around the virtual worlds by walking or flying. Elements such as proximity sensors triggering events, enemies making the player appear in another zone of the game when hit, and the ability to activate switches in order to open doors, make the worlds created with 3D Construction Kit come to life and add a level of uncertainty to the gameplay.

The interface of the game is customisable; by adding a 320×200, 16-colour IFF screen created with any image editing program, the games created with this tool could be made to look more professional.

=== Freescape Command Language ===
3D Construction Kit employs the Freescape Command Language (FCL), which allows functions to be performed when certain conditions occur within the Freescape environment. On 16-bit versions, these commands can be used in any of three places:

- Object conditions: executed when some kind of interaction with the specified object takes place
- Area conditions: executed each frame while the viewpoint is within the confines of the specified area
- General conditions: executed every frame regardless of the viewpoint position.

The 8-bit versions do not allow the creation of object conditions, but add procedures – conditions that can be executed from general or area conditions but are not otherwise triggered by the game engine.

Although the 8-bit and 16-bit versions of the language are similar, they are not interchangeable.

=== Sound ===
The 16-bit 3D Construction Kit has a standard sound bank which can store up to 32 sounds. Sounds 0–6 are predefined. These are: "00 Laser out", "01 Shooter", "02 Bump", "03 Explosion", "04 Ping", "05 Smash" and "06 Clang". The user can add up to 26 other sounds of their choosing.

The 8-bit version has a sound bank of 12 predefined sounds.

== Ports ==
3D Construction Kit was originally released for the Amstrad CPC, ZX Spectrum and Acorn Archimedes in May 1991. It was later adapted for numerous other platforms, including versions for the Amiga, Atari ST, PC as well as the Commodore 64 and Commodore 128.

The different versions of the game varied slightly in their user interface, which was progressively improved with each successive release. The 3D Construction Kit packages came with a 30-minute video tape, featuring an introduction and a tutorial presented by Ian Andrew, the original designer of the Freescape system. 3D Construction Kit is available in five language editions: English, German, French, Spanish and Italian.

== Reception ==
Reception

Review scores
Publication	Score
Your Sinclair	92% (ZX Spectrum)
Your Commodore	100% (C64)

Award
Publication	Award
Crash	Crash Smash

The ZX Spectrum version was critically acclaimed, receiving 92% from Your Sinclair and a Crash Smash from CRASH. The Commodore 64 version received a 100% rating from Your Commodore. The Amiga version received scores above 90% by three magazines: The One, Amiga Format and Amiga Action. Computer Gaming World was much less positive, warning that the PC version "is not for the fainthearted or the boot-up-and-play-without-looking-at-the-manual crowd". The magazine criticized the software only providing one large precreated object and the inability to reuse elements from the sample provided game, and stated that "the Freescape world itself [is] unsatisfying ... a heartless and barren place ... long abandoned by all forms of life". It concluded, "Users with no interest in programming are advised to stay well away".
