= Total Eclipse (1988 video game) =

- Cover art
- Developer: Major Developments
- Publisher: Incentive Software
- Designers: Paul Gregory, Chris Andrew, Sean Ellis, and Ian Andrew
- Composer: Wally Beben
- Engine: Freescape
- Platforms: Amiga, Atari ST, Amstrad CPC, C64, MS-DOS, ZX Spectrum
- Release: 1988
- Genres: Adventure, first-person shooter
- Mode: Single player

Total Eclipse is a first person adventure game released for the Amiga, Atari ST, Amstrad CPC, Commodore 64, MS-DOS and ZX Spectrum computers in 1988 and published by Incentive Software. It can also be considered an early example of a first-person shooter.

== Plot ==
In Ancient Egypt, a priest angry at the population turning against the gods has put a curse on a pyramid dedicated to the Sun God Re, and any object obstructing Re's shrine from the Sun will be destroyed. The player is an unnamed archaeologist who learns that on 26th October 1930, a total eclipse will obstruct the sun above Cairo, and the curse will cause the Moon to explode, devastating Earth with debris. He decides to travel to the pyramid and destroy Re's shrine, preventing the curse.

The game starts having just arrived with his biplane parked outside the pyramid he is about to enter, two hours before the eclipse. The player has to enter and explore the pyramid, avoid traps, trigger and activate puzzles and navigate through maze-like rooms. Causes of death include dehydration, and heart attack caused by various hazards such as falling off ledges, getting crushed by falling stones and taking too many hits from poison darts. Throughout the maze the player can discover treasure to accumulate their score, ankhs that serve as keys to locked doors, and water troughs to replenish the water bottle.

== Gameplay ==
Total Eclipse added multi-levels and stairs to the 3D environment (Atari ST version)

Like the previous Freescape games developed by Major Developments, Total Eclipse takes place from the point of view of the main character, who can move freely within the 3D environment of the game. This time, however, the emphasis is more on adventure, puzzle-solving and survival; with multi-level environments to move around and explore.

The key elements of the game consist of:

- A water jar, with water which diminishes as the player progresses; when it is empty the player will die of dehydration. The jar can be refilled with water found around the levels.
- A heart-rate monitor, which serves as a health indicator. When the player suffers from damage or walks around a dangerous area, the rate will increase. The player can lower it by resting, sacrificing some of the available time. If the heart rate increases too much the player suffers a heart attack resulting in Game over.
- A torch, with a limited battery-life, which allows you to explore some of the darker areas of the game.
- A magnetic compass for navigation
- A wrist watch and a depiction of the sun with the moon as it passes across the sun's face, both of which show the remaining time.
- A pistol which is used for manipulating the environment, such as shooting at doors, chests and mechanisms to open or trigger them. There are also a few enemies. The pistol has infinite ammo.

Items that can be found in the pyramid are

- Pairs of symbols, which the player must shoot in order to trigger something (e.g. open a locked door)
- Pools or fountains of water to fill the water jar.
- Ankhs that serve as keys to barred doors; these are finite throughout the pyramid, and part of the challenge consists of not wasting them.
- The player can also find treasure, which simply serves as a side quest and only accumulates score.

== Development ==
Total Eclipse was the third game to use the Freescape engine, which allowed the production of full three-dimensional environments using filled polygons in which the player could move around freely. However, the engine was improved for this release, adding spheres to the collection of shapes used for building the 3D environments.

Like the previous Freescape-based games, it also gave the player the ability to 'crouch', and look up and down, as well as rotate left and right, something which was rare amongst 3D games of the time. The same engine was used for its sequel, Total Eclipse II: The Sphinx Jinx.

== Reception ==
Reception

Awards
Publication	Award
Crash	Crash Smash
Your Sinclair	Megagame
Amstrad Action	Mastergame

Amiga/ST Format gave Total Eclipse a score of 78% in its July issue of 1989, bemoaning the similarity to previous Freescape games as its biggest downfall. The reviewer, Gary Barett, concluded, "Do not misunderstand me, though, Total Eclipse is the best of Freescape games, but the originality has gone".

Zzap! awarded a higher score of 84%, praising the game's moody music and claustrophobic feel, and stating that "Dark Side comes close in terms of realism but to my mind Total Eclipse has a lot better atmosphere".
