= 3D Construction Kit II =

- Released as Virtual Reality Studio 2.0 in North America
- Developer: Incentive Software
- Publisher: Domark
- Programmer: Paul Gregory
- Artists: The Kremlin (Domark); Liam Johnston; Marc Epstein
- Composers: Dave Chapman; Oxford Mobius
- Engine: Freescape
- Platforms: Amiga, Atari ST, MS-DOS
- Release: EU: 1992; NA: 10 November 1992
- Genre: Game creation system
- Mode: Single player

3D Construction Kit II (released in North America as Virtual Reality Studio 2.0), is a utility for creating 3D virtual worlds in Freescape. Developed by Incentive Software and published by Domark, it was released on November 10, 1992 as a sequel to 3D Construction Kit. Unlike its predecessor, 3D Construction Kit II was released simultaneously on three platforms: Amiga, Atari ST and MS-DOS.

== Features ==
3D Construction Kit II takes advantage of the refined Freescape III engine for its 3D graphics. Compared to the original, 3D Construction Kit II has double the number of controls and commands for added complexity and flexibility. Transparent objects can be created and ones that fade over time. The game supports rounded objects such as "flexicubes" and spheres, which were not possible in the original 3D Construction Kit. This feature is emphasised in the modified cover art.

The sound effects editor is improved, allowing players to add sounds and music to their virtual creations. The program comes with a library of predesigned 3D "clipart" aimed at novice users who may not know how to create more complex structures themselves.

As in the previous version game files may be compiled into stand-alone programs that can be run independently of the editor.

Like the original 3D Construction Kit, the program came packaged with a tutorial on VHS video cassette.

== Reception ==
The Amiga version received a score of 80% on Amiga Power, 78% on Amiga Format and 72% on CU Amiga.

== See also ==
- Virtual Reality
- VRML
