= List of video game magazines =

This is a list of video game magazines. The primary focus of the magazines in this list is or was video game journalism for at least part of their run. For general computing magazines that may also cover games, consult the list of computer magazines.

== Overview ==
Journalist reporting and evaluation of video games in periodicals began from the late 1970s to 1980 in general coin-operated industry magazines like Play Meter and RePlay, home entertainment magazines like Video, as well as magazines focused on computing and new information technologies like InfoWorld or Popular Electronics.

However, dedicated magazines focusing primarily on video game journalism wouldn't appear until late in 1981, when several magazines were launched independently of each other at about the same time. Computer and Video Games premiered in the U.K. in November 1981. It was soon followed by Electronic Games in the US, founded by Bill Kunkel, Arnie Katz and Joyce Worley, who had previously written the "Arcade Alley" column in Video. While Electronic Games covered arcade and console games as well as computer software, Computer Gaming World was focused entirely on the latter. The video game crash of 1983 badly hurt the market for North American video game magazines. Computer Gaming World, founded in 1981, stated in 1987 that it was the only survivor of 18 color magazines for computer games in 1984.

Meanwhile, in Japan, the first magazines entirely dedicated to video games began appearing from 1982, beginning with ASCII's Login, followed by several SoftBank publications and Kadokawa Shoten's Comptiq. The first magazine dedicated to console games, or a specific video game console, was Tokuma Shoten's Family Computer Magazine, which began in 1985 and was focused on Nintendo's Family Computer (Nintendo Entertainment System in the West). This magazine later spawned famous imitators such as Famicom Tsuushin (loosely, "Famicom Journal") in 1986 (now known today as Famitsu) and Nintendo Power in 1988.

In the mid-2000s, the popularity of print-based magazines started to wane in favor of web-based magazines. In 2006, Eurogamer's business development manager Pat Garratt wrote a criticism of those in print games journalism who had not adapted to the web, drawing on his own prior experience in print to offer an explanation of both the challenges facing companies like Future Publishing and why he believed they had not overcome them.

== List ==
Name (Note: Title of the publication; in case the title was changed during a magazine's run, older titles are attached in brackets.)	Founded (Note: The year of first publication)	Defunct (Note: The last year of publication, if the magazine is defunct; if the print edition of a magazine brand is discontinued, the magazine is listed as defunct.)	Country (Note: Country of publication; if a magazine was circulated in multiple countries, only the country of origin is given.)	Publisher (Note: The name of the publisher; if the publisher changed during a publication's run, all publishers are given with their respective publication years in brackets.)	Topics (Note: Brief summary of the general range of topics, platforms and genres covered.)	Ref. (Note: References for all used information)
110% Gaming	2014		United Kingdom	DC Thomson	Gaming for kids	
360 Magazine	2005	2012	United Kingdom	Imagine Publishing	Xbox 360	
360 Gamer	2005	2014	United Kingdom	Uncooked Media	Xbox 360	
3DO Magazine	1994		United Kingdom	Paragon Publishing	3DO	
4Players Magazin (a.k.a. 4Players iPad Magazin)	2011	2014	Germany	Computec Media GmbH	Video game journalism	
Ação Games	1991	2003	Brazil	Editora Abril, Editora Azul	General video gaming	
ACE	1987	1992	United Kingdom	Future Publishing (1987–1989); EMAP (1989–1992)	Atari ST, Amiga, C64, ZX Spectrum, Amstrad CPC, and newly released machines	
Aktueller Software Markt	1986	1995	Germany	Tronic Verlag	General video gaming	
Amiga Action	1989	1996	United Kingdom	Europress	Amiga games magazine which merged with Amiga Computing in 1996.	
Amiga Force	1992	1994	United Kingdom	Europress Impact	Amiga games magazine	
Amiga Format	1989	2000	United Kingdom	Future Publishing	Amiga games magazine	
Amiga Joker	1989	1996	Germany	Joker Verlag	Amiga games magazine	
Amiga Power	1991	1996	United Kingdom	Future Publishing	Amiga games magazine	
Amstrad Action	1985	1995	United Kingdom	Future Publishing	Amstrad CPC	
Amtix	1985	1987	United Kingdom	Newsfield Publications Ltd.	Amstrad CPC games magazine; merged with Computing With The Amstrad	
Appli Style	2010		Japan	East Press (2010–2014); Appli Style (2014–present)	Mobile games	
Arcade	1998	2000	United Kingdom	Future Publishing	General video gaming	
Atari Age	1982	1984	United States	The Atari Club	Atari related topics	
B's LOG	2002		Japan	Enterbrain (2000–2013); Kadokawa (2013–present)	Female-oriented, otome, BL	
Bad Influence! Magazine	1992	1992	United Kingdom	Europress	general video gaming	
Bazinama	2002	2019	Iran	?	Iranian video game magazine	
Big K Magazine	1984	1985	United Kingdom	IPC Magazines Ltd	Commodore 64 games	
BugBug	1992		Japan	Sun Publishing; Fujimi Publishing; Schola Magazine; Tatsumi Publishing	Bishōjo game	
CD-Action	1996		Poland	Fantasyexpo	Video games	
CGMagazine	2010		Canada	CGMagazine Publishing Group	Video Games, Movies, Comics, Tech	
Click!	1999	2009	Poland	Bauer	Biweekly in 1999–2001, monthly from 2002 onwards	
Commodore Force	1993	1994	United Kingdom	Europress Impact	Commodore 64 games	
Commodore Format	1990	1995	United Kingdom	Future Publishing	Commodore 64 games magazine	
Comptiq	1983		Japan	Kadokawa Shoten	Multi-media games	
Comp Ace	2007		Japan	Kadokawa Shoten	Bishōjo games and visual novels	
Computer and Video Games	1981	2004	United Kingdom	Future Publishing	Home computing, arcade games, video games; web-based magazine defunct as of February 2015.	
Computer Gamer	1985	1987	United Kingdom	Argus Specialist Publications	Computer game topics	
Computer Game Review	1991	1996	United States	Sendai Publication Group	Computer gaming magazine	
Computer Gaming World	1981	2006	United States	Ziff Davis	PC game topics, occasional console game topics	
Crash	1983	1992	United Kingdom	Newsfield & Europress	Sinclair Spectrum, SAM Coupé	
CU Amiga (previously: Vic Computing [1982–1983]; Commodore User [1983–1990])	1983	1998	United Kingdom	EMAP	Commodore computers; started as computer magazine; by 1985 mostly games coverage.	
Cube	2002	2005	United Kingdom	Paragon Publishing	GameCube Magazine	
Cybermycha	2000	2008	Poland	Egmont	Children's magazine, especially in early years.	
DC-UK	1999	2001	United Kingdom	Future Publishing	Dreamcast games magazine	
Debug	2023		United Kingdom	Debug Media	Indie games magazine	
LoveLive!Days (previously: Dengeki PC Engine [1992–1996]; Dengeki G's Engine [1996–1997]; Dengeki G's Magazine [1997–2022])	1992		Japan	ASCII Media Works	Love Live! anime and games (previously: NEC Consoles [1992–1996]; Bishōjo games [1996–2005]; Bishōjo games and anime [2005–2022])	
Dengeki Hime	1997	2014	Japan	Media Works (1997–2008); ASCII Media Works (2008–2014)	Eroge	
Dengeki Maoh	2005		Japan	ASCII Media Works	Seinen manga, light novels and video games	
Dengeki Nintendo (previously: Dengeki SUPER Famicom [1993–1996]; Dengeki NINTENDO64 [1996–2001]; Dengeki GB Advance [2001]; Dengeki GAMECUBE [2002–2006]; Dengeki Nintendo DS [2006–2012]; Dengeki Nintendo for Kids [2012–2013])	1993		Japan	Media Works (1993–2008); ASCII Media Works (2008–present)	Nintendo related topics	
Dengeki PlayStation	1995	2020	Japan	Media Works (1995–2008); ASCII Media Works (2008–present)	PlayStation games	
Diànzǐ Yóuxì Ruǎnjiàn	1994	2012	People's Republic of China	China Association for Science and Technology	China's first video game magazine. Covered PC and console gaming, anime, music, etc.	
Donya ye Bazi	2005	2014	Iran	Donyaye Bazi Organization	First Official Iranian Game Magazine	
E-Login	1995	2003	Japan	Enterbrain	Eroge	
Edge	1993		United Kingdom	Future Publishing	Console, PC, Arcade, Mobile games	
Electric Brain	1989	1993	United Kingdom	Space City Publishing	Console games	
Electronic Fun with Computers & Games	1982	1984	United States	Fun & Games Publishing Inc.	Video, computer and arcade games	
Electronic Games / Computer Entertainment	1981	1985	United States	Reese Communications (previously: Reese Publishing Company [1981–1983])	Video, computer and arcade games	
Electronic Gaming Monthly	1989	2009	United States	Sendai Publishing (1989–1996); Ziff Davis (1996–2009)	Video game journalism	
Electronic Gaming Monthly	2010	2015	United States	EGM Media	Video game journalism	
Expert Gamer (formerly EGM² [1994–1998])	1994	2001	United States	Sendai Publishing (1994–1996); Ziff Davis (1996–2001)	video game strategy guides and cheat codes	
Famicom Best (ファミコンBest)	1988	?	Japan	Gakken		
Famicom Champion (ファミコンチャンピオン)	1986	?	Japan	Akita Shoten	Nintendo, Sega and Super Cassette Vision games	
Famicom Hisshoubon (ファミコン必勝本)	1986	1990	Japan	JICC Publishing Bureau	Nintendo video game magazine	
Famicom Top (ファミコントップ)	1986	?	Japan	Gakken		
Family Computer Magazine (ファミリーコンピュータMagazine, Famimaga)(Retitled: Famimaga 64 [1996–1998]; )	1985	1998	Japan	Tokuma Shoten	Nintendo video game magazine	
Famitsu (Shūkan Famicom Tsūshin (週刊ファミコン通信, "Weekly Famicom News") [1991–1996] Famicom Tsūshin (ファミコン通信, "Famicom News") [86–91]	1986		Japan	ASCII (1986–2000); Enterbrain, Inc.(2000–2013); Kadokawa (2013–present)	Multiformat video game magazine	
From Gamers Magazine	2021		United States	From Gamers Magazine	Modern Gaming from an Indie Perspective	
FUN! Online Games Magazine	2009	2010	United States	Beckett Media	Children's online games	
G-Force	2002	2003	United Kingdom	Thin Ice Media	British Video game magazine	
Gambler	1993	1999	Poland	Lupus		
Game Boy (ゲームボーイ)	1985	?	Japan	Magazine Box		
Game Developer	1994	2013	United States	UBM Tech	The premier magazine for working (and aspiring) video game creators	
Game.EXE (Previously Toy Shop [1995–1996])	1997	2006	Russia	Computerra	Video Games	
Game Industry Report Magazine	?	2006	United States	GNB News Group	All aspects of the video game industry in the US	
Game Informer	1991		United States	Funco (1991–2000); GameStop (2000–2024); Gunzilla Games (2025-present)	Articles, news, strategy, and reviews of video games and associated consoles.	
GameFan (formerly Diehard GameFan)	1992	2000	United States	DieHard Gamers Club (1992–1996); Metropolis Media (1996–1998); Shinno Media (1999–2000)	Video game news –focus on Anime and RPG games, Dave Halverson first video game publication	
GameNOW	2001	2004	United States	Ziff Davis	Spinoff of EGM geared to younger audience	
Game Players (Note: Game Players was renamed to Ultra Game Players in 1996, and then to Game Buyer in 1998.)	1989	1998	United States	GP Publications (1989–96); Imagine Publishing (1996–98)	Video game journalism	
GamePro Media	1989	2011	United States	IDG (1989–2008); GamePro Media (2008–2011)	General video gaming	
Game Merchant	1981			Alex Marciniszyn	General video gaming and upcoming products	
Gamers	1995	2004	Brazil	Editora Escala	General video gaming	
GameStation	1998	2016	Indonesia		General video gaming	
Games for Windows: The Official Magazine	2006	2008	United States	Ziff Davis	Windows Games in partnership with Microsoft	
The Games Machine	1987	1990	United Kingdom	Newsfield Publications	General Video Gaming	
The Games Machine	1988		Italy	Aktia	Italian PC game magazine. PC and console gaming online.	
Games World	1994	199?	United Kingdom	Paragon Publishing	British video game magazine	
GamesMaster	1993	2018	United Kingdom	Future plc (1993–2003, 2006–2018); Summit Media (2003–2006)	Multiformat video games	
Gamereactor	1998	2015	Denmark	Gamez Publishing A/S	PC, Mobile and video game consoles	
Gamer'z	2002		South Korea	Game Munhwa	Multiformat video games	
GamesReviews	2013		Ireland	GamesReviews	General Video Gaming	
Gamest	1986	1999	Japan	Shinseisha	Arcade games	
GameStar	1997		Germany	IDG Entertainment Media (1997–2015); Webedia (2015–present)	PC games	
Gamestar Polska	2003	2003/2005/2011	Poland	IDG	Failed attempt at introducing GameStar brand in Poland. Eight issues released in 2003 before first cancellation, then 3 more in 2005 and 3 between 2009 and 2011.	
games^{TM}	2002	2018	United Kingdom	Future Publishing	UK-based computer and video games magazine	
GameWeek Magazine	1995	2002	United States	Cyberactive Media Group	General video gaming	
Gayming Magazine	2019		United Kingdom		LGBTQ in video games	
GB Action	1992	1995	United Kingdom	Europress Interactive	British Game Boy magazine	
GBX magazine	2001	2002	United Kingdom	Thin Ice Media	British Game Boy magazine	
Giochi per il mio computer	1997	2010	Italy	?	Italian video game magazine	
GMR Magazine	2003	2005	United States, Canada	Ziff Davis	PC games, Console games	
Hi-Score (ハイスコア)	1986	?	Japan	Hi-Score Media Co.		
Hippon Super! (必本スーパー)	1991	1995	Japan	JICC Publishing Bureau	Console and handheld games	
Hobby Consolas	1991		Spain	First Hobby Press, then Axel Springer	Spanish video game magazine specialized in console gaming	
Hobby's Jump	1983	1988	Japan	Shueisha	Shōnen manga and video games	
Hoog Spel	1990	2000	The Netherlands	Rangeela B.V.	Dutch gaming magazine	
HotGame	1999	2013	Indonesia	Kompas Gramedia	Video Games	
Hyper Magazine	1993	2019	Australia	Next Media (1993–2018); Future plc (2018–present)	Video games	
HyperPlay RPG	2015		United Kingdom	HyperPlay Limited	Role Playing Game Fanzine	
Interaction Magazine	1991	1999	United States	Sierra Entertainment	PC games	
Joystick Magazine	1988	2012	France	Hachette Filipacchi Médias	PC games	
Komputer Świat GRY	2000	2012	Poland	Ringier Axel Springer	Polish version of Computer Bild SPIELE, sister publication of Play. Monthly prior to 2008, then bimonthly.	
LeveL	1995		Czech Republic	?	PC, PS3, Xbox 360, Wii, PSP, Nintendo DS	
Login	1983	2008	Japan	ASCII Corporation (1983–2000); Enterbrain (2000–2008)	PC games	
Marukatsu Super Famicom (previously: Marukatsu Famicom [1986–1990])	1986	1996	Japan	Kadokawa Shoten	Nintendo consoles	
MCV/Develop (previously: MCV [1998–2019])	1998		United Kingdom	Future Publishing	business-focused topics of video games	
Mean Machines	1990	1992	United Kingdom	Emap	Mega Drive, Master System, NES, Game Boy, GX4000, Game Gear	Splite
Mean Machines Sega	1992	1997	United Kingdom	Emap	Mega Drive, Master System, Mega CD, Game Gear, 32X and Sega Saturn	
Mean Machines PlayStation	1996	1997	United Kingdom	Emap	PlayStation	
Megami Magazine	1999		Japan	Gakken	Anime and Video games	
Mega	1992	1995	United Kingdom	Future Publishing	Mega Drive games magazine	
Mega Action	1993	1994	United Kingdom	Europress	Mega Drive, Mega–CD	
Mega Drive Advanced Gaming	1992	1995	United Kingdom	Maverick Magazines	Mega Drive, Mega–CD, 32X	
Mega Play	1990	1995	United States	Sendai Publishing	Mega Drive games	
Mega Power	1993	1995	United Kingdom	Paragon Publishing	Mega Drive games	
MegaTech	1991	1994	United Kingdom	EMAP (1991–1993); Maverick Magazines (1993–1994)	Sega Mega Drive	
Mega Zone	1989	1995	Australia	Elwood, Vic.: Megazone Publications		
Megastore	1993		Japan	Core Magazine	Eroge	
MegaVisions Magazine	2016		United States	Mega Visions	SEGA-focused magazine	
Micromanía	1985	2024	Spain	HobbyPress (1985–1998); Axel Springer AG (1998–2012); BlueOcean Publishing (2012–present)	PC games	
Monthly Arcadia	1999	2015	Japan	Enterbrain	Video games	
MyM	2012	2018	United Kingdom	MCM Central	3DS, PC, PS3, PS4, PS Vita, Wii, Xbox 360, Xbox One	
N64 Gamer	1998	2001	Australia	Next Publishing	Dedicated N64 gaming magazine	
N64 Magazine (Italy)	1999	2000	Italy	Play Press	Nintendo games magazine	
Neo Plus	1999	2012	Poland		Console magazine.	
NEXT Generation	1995	2002	United States	Imagine Media	32-bit consoles, covers the video game industry rather than the games themselves	
New Computer Express	1988	1991	United Kingdom	Future Publishing	Multiformat home computer magazine	
NGC Magazine (previously: N64 Magazine [1997–2001])	1997	2006	United Kingdom	Future Publishing	Nintendo games magazine	
Nintendo Dream (previously: The 64 Dream [1996–2001])	1996		Japan	Ambit Co., Ltd.	Japanese Nintendo-focused magazine	
Nintendo Force	2013		United States	MagCloud/NF Publishing LLC	Nintendo games	
Nintendo Fun Club News	1987	1988	United States	Nintendo of America	Official Nintendo consoles coverage. Started in 1987 as a newsletter; discontinued in favor of Nintendo Power.	
Nintendo Gamer (previously: NGamer [2006–2011])	2006	2012	United Kingdom	Future Publishing	British magazine covering Nintendo products	
Nintendo La Rivista Ufficiale	1997	2012	Italy	MER7	Italian Nintendo related topics	
Nintendo, le magazine officiel	1997	2012	France	Levallois-Perret	French Nintendo related topics	
Nintendo Magazine System	1993	2000	Australia	Catalyst Publishing	Australian Nintendo related topics	
Nintendo Magazine System (UK)	1992	2006	United Kingdom	Emap	United Kingdom Nintendo related topics	
Nintendo Power	1988	2012	United States	Nintendo of America (1988–2007); Future U.S. Publishing (2007–2012)	Official Nintendo consoles coverage	
Nintendo World (Brazil)	1998	2017	Brazil	Editora Tambor	Nintendo related	
Nintendo World (UK)	1999	2000	United Kingdom	Future Publishing	Nintendo games magazine	
Old School Gamer Magazine	2017		United States	BC Productions Inc.	Retro Gaming	
Official Dreamcast Magazine (UK)	1999	2001	United Kingdom	Dennis Publishing	UK Dreamcast related topics	
Official Dreamcast Magazine (US)	1999	2001	United States	Imagine Media	US Dreamcast related topics	
Official Nintendo Magazine (Australia)	2008	2013	Australia, New Zealand	Future Publishing	Australia & New Zealand Nintendo related topics	
Official Nintendo Magazine (UK)	2006	2014	United Kingdom	Future Publishing	UK Nintendo related topics	
PlayStation Official Magazine – Australia	2007		Australia	Citrus Media (2007–2017); Future Australia (2017–present)	Australian PlayStation related topics	
Official UK PlayStation Magazine	1995	2004	United Kingdom	Future Plc	UK PlayStation related topics	
Official U.S. PlayStation Magazine	1997	2007	United States	Ziff Davis	US PlayStation related topics, succeeded by Future's PlayStation: The Official Magazine	
Official Xbox Magazine	2001	2020	United Kingdom; United States	Future PLC; Future US	Xbox related topics	
The One	1988	1996	United Kingdom	EMAP	Amiga, Atari ST, PC	
Oyungezer	2007		Turkey	Seti Publishing	PC, PS3, Xbox 360, Wii, PSP, Nintendo DS	
P-mate	1999	2005	Japan	Mainichi Communications Inc. MC Press; Ohzora Publishing.Co.Ltd.	Eroge	
Page 6	1982	1998	United Kingdom	Page 6 Publishing	The Atari 8-bit range and Atari ST	
Pasocom Paradise	1991	2013	Japan	Sandēsha	Eroge	
Personal Computer Games	1983	1985	United Kingdom	VNU	PC games	
PC Accelerator	1998	2000	United States	Imagine Media	Men's magazine-style PC games coverage	
PC Angel neo (previously: PC Angel)	1992	2012	Japan	GMS publishing Adachi East Create; Odesseus Publishing; Aozora Publishing	Eroge	
PC Engine Fan	1988	1996	Japan	Tokuma Shoten	NEC Consoles	
PC Format	1991	2015	United Kingdom	Future Publishing	PC magazine	
PC Gamer	1993		United Kingdom; United States	Future Publishing	PC games	
PC Games	1992		Germany	Computec Media AG	PC games	
PC Mania	1998	2009	Bulgaria	PC Mania	PC games	
PC PowerPlay	1996	2025	Australia	Future Australia	PC games	
PC Zone	1993	2010	United Kingdom	Future plc	PC games	
PCW Plus (previously: 8000 Plus [1986–1992])	1986	1996	United Kingdom	Future Publishing	Amstrad PCW computers	
Pelaaja	2002		Finland	H-Town Oy	Finnish gaming magazine	
Pelit	1992		Finland	Fokus Media Finland Oy	The oldest and most popular videogame magazine of Finland	
Pixel	2015		Poland	Idea Ahead	General video gaming and pop-culture	
Planet PC	1999	2001	United Kingdom	?	PC games	
Play	2000	2012	Poland	Ringier Axel Springer	Sister publication of Komputer Świat GRY. Multiplatform prior to 2002, then PC-only.	
Play	1994	2013	People's Republic of China	Science Popularization Publication	China's first PC-gaming-specific magazine	
Play Magazine (UK)	1995	2016	United Kingdom	Imagine Publishing	PlayStation consoles	
Play Meter	1974	2018	United States	Skybird Publishing	Coin-op and arcade games	
Player One	1990	2000	France	Média Système Édition	Console games	
PlayNation (previously: PlayStation Plus [1995–2000])	2001	200?	United Kingdom	Dennis Publishing	PlayStation magazine	
PlayStation: The Official Magazine	2007	2012	United States	Future US	PlayStation related topics, successor to Ziff Davis' OPM upon discontinuation of PSM	
PlayStation Official Magazine (Italy) (previously: Ufficiale PlayStation Magazine [1996–2000]; Ufficiale PlayStation 2 Magazine [2000–2002]; PlayStation 2 Magazine Ufficiale [2002–2006]; PlayStation Magazine Ufficiale [2006–2012])	2002	2019	Italy	Il Mio Castello (1996–2000); Future Media Italy (2000–2002); Play Media Company (2002–2012); Lunasia Edizioni (2013–present)	Italian PlayStation related topics	
PLAY Magazine (previously: PlayStation Official Magazine – UK [2006–2021])	2006	2024	United Kingdom	Future Publishing	UK PlayStation related topics	
PlayStation Underground	1997	2001	United States	Sony Computer Entertainment America	PlayStation, PlayStation 2	
PSM: Independent PlayStation Magazine (PSM: 100% Independent PlayStation 2 Magazine [2000–2005] PSM: 100% Independent PlayStation Magazine [1997–2000])	1997	2007	United States	Imagine Media (1998–2003); Future Network USA (2003–2005); Future US (2005–2007)	PlayStation family news	
Swipe Magazine (previously: Pocket Gamer: Mobile Games + Apps [2007–2011])	2007	2013	United Kingdom	Steel Media Ltd	Mobile games	
Power Play	1993	2000s	Germany	Magna Media	PC games	
PC PowerPlay	2004	2007	Germany	Cypress	PC games	
PC Action	1996	2012	Germany	Computec Media	PC games	
Bravo Screenfun	1997	2009	Germany	Heinrich Bauer Zeitschriften Verlag KG	PC games	
Computer Bild Spiele	1999	2019	Germany	Computer Bild Digital GmbH	PC games	
Power Unlimited	1993		The Netherlands	VNU Media (1993–2007); HUB Uitgevers (2007–2013); Reshift Digital (2013–present)	Dutch gaming magazine	
PSM3 (previously: PSM2 [2000–2006])	2000	2012	United Kingdom	Future Publishing	Sony video game consoles and PlayStation games	
PSX Fan	1998	2001	Poland	Computer Graphics Studio	PlayStation-dedicated.	
PSX Extreme	1997		Poland	Idea Ahead	Console magazine, PlayStation-only prior to 2001.	
PNM (Pure Nintendo)	2011		United States	MagCloud/Pure Media LLC	All things Nintendo related	
Push!!	1994	2015	Japan	MAX.Co.	Eroge	
Raze Magazine	1990	1991	United Kingdom	Newsfield	Master System, NES	
RePlay	1975		United States	RePlay Publishing	Coin-op and arcade games	
Retro Gamer	2004		United Kingdom	Live Publishing (2004–2005); Imagine Publishing (2005–2016); Future Publishing (2016–present)	Retro games from multiple platforms, often via an Emulator	
SCORE	1994		Czech Republic	Omega Publishing Group, s.r.o	Console and PC games	
Saturn Power	1997	1998	United Kingdom	Future Publishing	Sega Saturn games	
Secret Service	1993	2001	Poland	ProScript	Polish game magazine, video games - all platforms	
Secret Service	2014	2014	Poland	Idea-Ahead	Polish game magazine, video games - all platforms	
Sega Force	1992	1993	United Kingdom	Europress Impact	Sega games magazine	
Sega Magazine	1994	1995	United Kingdom	EMAP	Official Sega publication; relaunched as Sega Saturn Magazine (1995–1998).	
Sega Power (previously: S: The Sega Magazine [1989–1990])	1989	1997	United Kingdom	Future Publishing	Sega video games	
Sega Pro	1991	1996	United Kingdom	Paragon Publishing	Master System, Game Gear, Mega Drive	
Sega Saturn Magazine	1995	1998	United Kingdom	EMAP	Sega Saturn games. Official Sega publication; the successor to Sega Magazine (1994–1995).	
Sega Visions	1990	1995	United States	Sega of America (1987–89); Sega/The Communique Group (1990–1992); Sega/Infotainment World (1992–95)	Official Sega magazine, competed with Nintendo Power	
Sinclair Programs	1982	1985	United Kingdom	ECC Publications	ZX80, ZX81 and ZX Spectrum computers	
Sinclair User	1982	1993	United Kingdom	?	Sinclair Spectrum	
SKOAR!	2003	2017	India	Jasubhai Digital Media Pvt. Ltd.	Indian game magazine	
SNES Force	1993	1994	United Kingdom	Europress	SNES Magazine	
ST Format	1989	1996	United Kingdom	Future Publishing	Atari ST games magazine	
ST/Amiga Format	1988	1989	United Kingdom	Future Publishing	Atari ST and Amiga games magazine	
Strana Igr	1996	2013	Russia	Gameland	Russian game magazine	
Super Action	1992	1994	United Kingdom	Europress Interactive	SNES magazine	
Super Control (previously: Control [1992–1993])	1992	199?	United Kingdom	Maverick Magazines	SNES game magazine	
Super GamePower (previously SuperGame [1991–1994], GamePower [1992–1994])	1994	2006	Brazil	Editora Nova Cultural, Editora Option	General video gaming	
Super Play	1992	1996	United Kingdom	Future Publishing	SNES magazine	
Super PLAY	1993	2009	Sweden		Swedish game magazine	
Super Pro	1992	1994	United Kingdom	Paragon Publishing	SNES game magazine	
Świat Gier Komputerowych	1992	2003	Poland	?	Polish video game magazine	
Tech Gian	1996	2021	Japan	ASCII; Enterbrain, Inc. Kadokawa Shoten	Bishōjo game	
Tilt	1982	1994	France	Editions Mondiales S.A.	PC and Console gaming	
Tips and Tricks	1995	2007	United States	LFP (Larry Flynt Publications)	Video game strategy guides, codes and walkthroughs	
Top Secret	1990	1996	Poland	Spółdzielnia Wydawnicza "Bajtek"	Started as a de facto solution magazine due to early '90 market needs.	
Top Secret (Reboot)	2002	2003	Poland	Ringier Axel Springer	Only four issues printed.	
Total!	1993	2000	United Kingdom	MVL-Verlag (1993–1995); X-Plain Verlag (1996–2000)	Nintendo games; brand licensed from UK magazine, but independent content	
Total Control	1998	1999	United Kingdom	Rapide Publishing	Short-lived independent multi-format games magazine.	
TurboPlay	1990	1992	United States	L.F.P., Inc.	TurboGrafx-16, TurboGrafx-CD, Turbo Duo, TurboExpress, SuperGrafx	
Velikiy Drakon	1993	2004	Russia	Video-Ace	Video games	
Videogaming Illustrated	1982	1983	United States	Ion International, Inc.	Video games	
Video Games Magazine	1982	1984	United States	Pumpkin Press	Video games	
Video Games Player	1982	1984	United States	Carnegie Publications Corp.	Video games	
VideoGames - The Ultimate Gaming Magazine (previously VideoGames & Computer Entertainment [1988–1993])	1993	1996	United States	L.F.P., Inc.	Video games, PC games and arcades	
V Jump	1993		Japan	Shueisha	Video games and Shōnen manga	
Xbox World	2003	2012	United Kingdom	Future Publishing	Xbox video game consoles and Xbox games	
X-One (Previously X360 [2005–2013])	2005	2015	United Kingdom	Imagine Publishing	Xbox 360, Xbox one	
XtremPC	1998	2010	Romania		PC games, game consoles	
X64	1997	2000	France	Edicorp Publications	Nintendo games magazine	
Your Sinclair	1984	1993	United Kingdom	Dennis Publishing (1984–1990); Future Publishing (1990–1993)	Sinclair Spectrum, SAM Coupé	
Zero	1989	1992	United Kingdom	Dennis Publishing	Amiga, Atari ST, PC games	
Zzap!64	1985	1992	United Kingdom	Newsfield Publications (1985–1991); Europress Impact (1991–1992)	Commodore 64 games	

== See also ==
- Category:Game magazines
- Category:Video game magazines
- List of video game websites
- Video game journalism
