= School of Convergence =

Media school in New Delhi, India

9.9 School of Convergence
- Established: 2001
- Location: New Delhi, India
- Website: schoolofconvergence.com

9.9 School of Convergence, also known as SoC, is a small media school in New Delhi, India. The school has Pramath Raj Sinha, the founding dean of Indian School of Business, as its dean.

== History ==
The School of Convergence (SoC) was set up in October 2001 by Kaleidoscope Entertainment, headed by Bobby Bedi. The school started with a Two Year Post Graduate Diploma Course in Content Creation and Management (PGDCCM) combining print, radio, television, cinema and the Internet. This course offered knowledge and skills in all streams of media and management. It combines the curricula of a journalism school, a film school and a management school. The Media School licensed its brand to 9.9 Mediaworx Pvt. Ltd. to start journalism courses as 9.9 School of Convergence and it starting its first batch in September 2009 with just one course, an eleven-month diploma in Applied Journalism.

=== Events ===
- 2001: SoC set up in May 2001 at the International Management Institute (IMI), New Delhi. The flagship program was a first-of-its-kind two-years PG Diploma in Content Creation and Management, combining curricula of journalism school, film school and management school
- 2003: SoC ties-up with St. Stephen’s College to operate a ‘Centre of Media Studies’ for their students
- 2004: SoC ranked India's fifth-best school in Media and Mass Communication by Outlook magazine
- 2004: SoC extends college tie-up to Hindu College, Jesus & Mary College, Gargi College, and Sri Venkateswara College
- 2005: SoC ties-up with the prestigious Indian Institute of Foreign Trade (IIFT), New Delhi, Indian Institute of Management Calcutta, and Film and Television Institute of India, Pune for specialized media courses
- 2006: SoC launches a Post Graduate Diploma in Advertising and Public Relations
- 2005: As an indication of the strong industry buy-in of SoC curriculum and students India’s leading media companies - ABP Group, CyberMedia and Kaleidoscope Entertainment offer guaranteed placements to student scoring an 'A' grade
- 2009: New leadership team revives SoC after a hiatus

== Programme ==
9.9 School of Convergence offers a Diploma in Applied Journalism. The programme equips aspiring journalists with the core skills required for success in their profession – high-quality and consistent reporting, writing and editing skills.

The course is primarily taught by practicing journalists, who have excelled at their craft and gained enough experience to teach the dos and don’ts of the profession. In fact, the weekly modules have been received with enthusiasm by media practitioners approached by 9.9 SoC because of the high degree of practicality in the syllabus.

== Faculty ==
The school's faculty has included Graham Watts, a journalist and trainer; BV Rao, consulting editor with MoneyLife, a fortnightly magazine, and a columnist on Indian media; Rasheeda Bhagat, associate editor of Hindu Business Line; Edward Henning, a teacher-turned-journalist; Vanita Kohli-Khandekar, independent media consultant and writer.

Other faculty members are Savyasaachi Jain, Mala Bhargava, Jacob Cherian, Radha Hegde, Vinay Kamat, Pooja Kothari, Ranbir Majumdar, Eric Saranovitz and Pramath Raj Sinha himself.

== Advisory board ==
- Prof Sanjeev Chatterjee, vice dean, School of Communication, and executive director, Knight Center for International Media, University of Miami, Florida
- Clive Crook, Chief Washington commentator for Financial Times; senior editor, The Atlantic Monthly; columnist, National Journal (formerly deputy editor of The Economist)
- Don Durfee, Hong Kong bureau chief of Thomson Reuters (formerly editor of CFO Asia and CFO China, and with the Economist Intelligence Unit)
- Indrajit Gupta, editor, Forbes India (formerly resident editor, Economic Times, Mumbai; national business editor, Times of India; deputy editor, Businessworld)
- Prof Radha Hegde, Dept of Media, Culture and Communication & the Steinhardt School of Culture, Education and Human Development, New York University
- Tony Joseph, CEO, Mindworks Global Media Services (formerly editor, Businessworld, associate editor, Business Standard; features editor, Economic Times)
- Vinay Kamat, editor, DNA Bangalore (formerly editor of Business Times, the business supplement of The Times of India, the editor of indiatimes.com and associate editor of Business Today)
- Surya Mantha, CEO, Web 18 (formerly with Sify India, RealNetworks, PRTM, and Xerox Corp, all in the US)
- Graham Watts, consultant, New Paragraph Company, Bangkok, Thailand (formerly spent 20 years with the Financial Times, including as a journalism trainer)

=== Campus ===
The 9.9 SoC has tie-ups with TV and radio studios for practical sessions.

Address :-Sri Aurobindo Society, New Mehrauli Road, Adchini, New Delhi - 110 017

== About 9.9 Media ==
9.9 Media is a diversified media company started by former ABP CEO Dr. Pramath Raj Sinha along with four of his other colleagues. It targets consumer, business and professional communities through magazines, websites, events, and peer groups.

Other than SoC, 9.9 Media publishes several other magazines, manages professional institutes and host online platforms.

== See also ==
- CFO India
- CTO Forum
- Digit
- Digit Channel Connect
- Digit TV
- Edu
- Fast Track
- Inc. India
- Industry 2.0
- Logistics 2.0
- Skoar
- Pramath Raj Sinha
