= GMR (magazine) =

Defunct video game magazine

- GMR Issue 25 - February 2005
- Categories: Console gaming, Computer gaming
- Frequency: Monthly
- First issue: February 2003
- Final issue: February 2005
- Company: Ziff Davis
- Country: United States, Canada
- Language: English
- Website: GMR on the 1UP Network
- ISSN: 1544-6816

GMR was a monthly magazine on video games that was published by Ziff-Davis — the publisher of such magazines as PC Magazine, Electronic Gaming Monthly, and Computer Gaming World (later Games for Windows: The Official Magazine). GMR was launched in February 2003, being sold in only the Electronics Boutique (EB) chain of video game stores. The magazine was unusual among multiconsole magazines in that it covered PC as well as console games, as well as its minimalistic cover art, and, in its last few months, its shift in focus toward promotion of less mainstream titles. It lasted exactly two years, as the 25th and last issue (which was only sent to subscribers) was the February 2005 edition (though prints were limited and not even all subscribers received the final issue).

As the magazine was funded by Electronics Boutique, the magazine stopped circulation when GameStop merged with EB Games, as GameStop already had its own magazine, Game Informer. The fates of its entire staff remain unknown, although James "Milkman" Mielke and Andrew "Skip" Pfister have transferred to the 1Up.com Network online.

Shortly after the release of the PS2 game Monster Hunter, an online-only Event Quest was released which allowed players to obtain the "GMR Chrome Heart," a weapon prominently featuring an embossed GMR logo.

== Magazine covers ==
Each month had a title, e.g. "The Rainbow Issue", "The First Issue". These are listed where known.

- February 2003: Dead or Alive: Extreme Beach Volleyball - "The First Issue"
- March 2003: Xenosaga - "The Chewy issue"
- April 2003: Zone of the Enders - "The Metal issue"
- May 2003: Auto Modellista - "The Speed issue"
- June 2003: World of Warcraft, Star Wars Galaxies - "The Wired issue"
- July 2003: Metal Gear Solid 3: Snake Eater - "The Jungle issue"
- August 2003: Ninja Gaiden - "The Masked issue"
- September 2003: Soul Calibur II - "The Kick A** Issue"
- October 2003: F-Zero GX - "The Future Issue"
- November 2003: SSX 3 - "The Frosted Issue"
- December 2003: Tony Hawk's Underground - "The Flipped Issue"
- January 2004: Rainbow Six 3, Ninja Gaiden - "The Creepy Issue"
- February 2004: Darkwatch - "The Dead Issue"
- March 2004: Star Wars: Republic Commando - "The Space Issue"
- April 2004: Astro Boy - "The Anime Issue"
- May 2004: Nina: Death By Degrees - "The Women Issue"
- June 2004: Onimusha 3 - "The Samurai Issue"
- July 2004: Kingdom Hearts: Chain of Memories - "The magic issue"
- August 2004: Everquest 2, Monster Hunter, Final Fantasy XI: Chains of Promathia, The Matrix Online - Four different covers, "The Online World issue"
- September 2004: Grand Theft Auto: San Andreas - "The Sandbox Issue"
- October 2004: Fable, Dead or Alive Ultimate - Two different covers, "The Hot Pink Issue"
- November 2004: Paper Mario: The Thousand-Year Door - "the it's a-me issue"
- December 2004: Need For Speed Underground 2, - "The nitro issue"
- January 2005: Halo 2 - "The FPS Issue"
- February 2005: Resident Evil 4 - "The last issue"

== Rating system ==
When games were reviewed, they were rated on a scale of 1 to 10. (A score of 0 was twice used, for Postal² and Ping Pals.) A score of 9 or 10 was considered excellent, 7 or 8 good, 4 to 6 mediocre, and 1 to 3 bad. As well, the GMR Essential Selection logo would be awarded to all games scoring 10 and some games scoring 9. With the rating would come a one- or two-word comment, often a pun on the game's title, and three lines of comparisons (usually "Better Than:/Not As Good As:/Wait For It:").

Previewers would rate their excitement about an upcoming game on a scale of 1 to 5 flames, although one-flame previews were absent and two-flame previews rare.

== Game Geezer ==
One of the most popular sections of the magazine was an editorial that appeared in the final pages of most every issue called Game Geezer. The editorial was written as though it were being dictated by an excessively cranky old man in a humorous tone and was well regarded by readers for its concise opinions and arguments regarding the video game industry and player community.

Game Geezer was later revealed to be written by Jeff Green, former editor-in-chief of Games for Windows: The Official Magazine and Computer Gaming World. The column was also written, on a fill-in basis, by former Xbox Nation editor Greg Orlando.
