= PlayStation Magazine Ufficiale =

Italian edition of PlayStation: The Official Magazine

- Categories: Games magazine
- Frequency: Monthly
- Founded: 2002
- Company: Play Media Company
- Country: Italy
- Based in: Rome
- Language: Italian

PlayStation Magazine Ufficiale, also known by the acronym PSMU, initially named as Ufficiale PlayStation Magazine and after as PlayStation 2 Magazine Ufficiale, is the Italian edition of PlayStation: The Official Magazine video game magazine, specializing in all Sony video game consoles and handheld gaming platforms. The magazine features previews, reviews, and cheat codes for Sony games.
