= Jeff Green (writer) =

American video game journalist

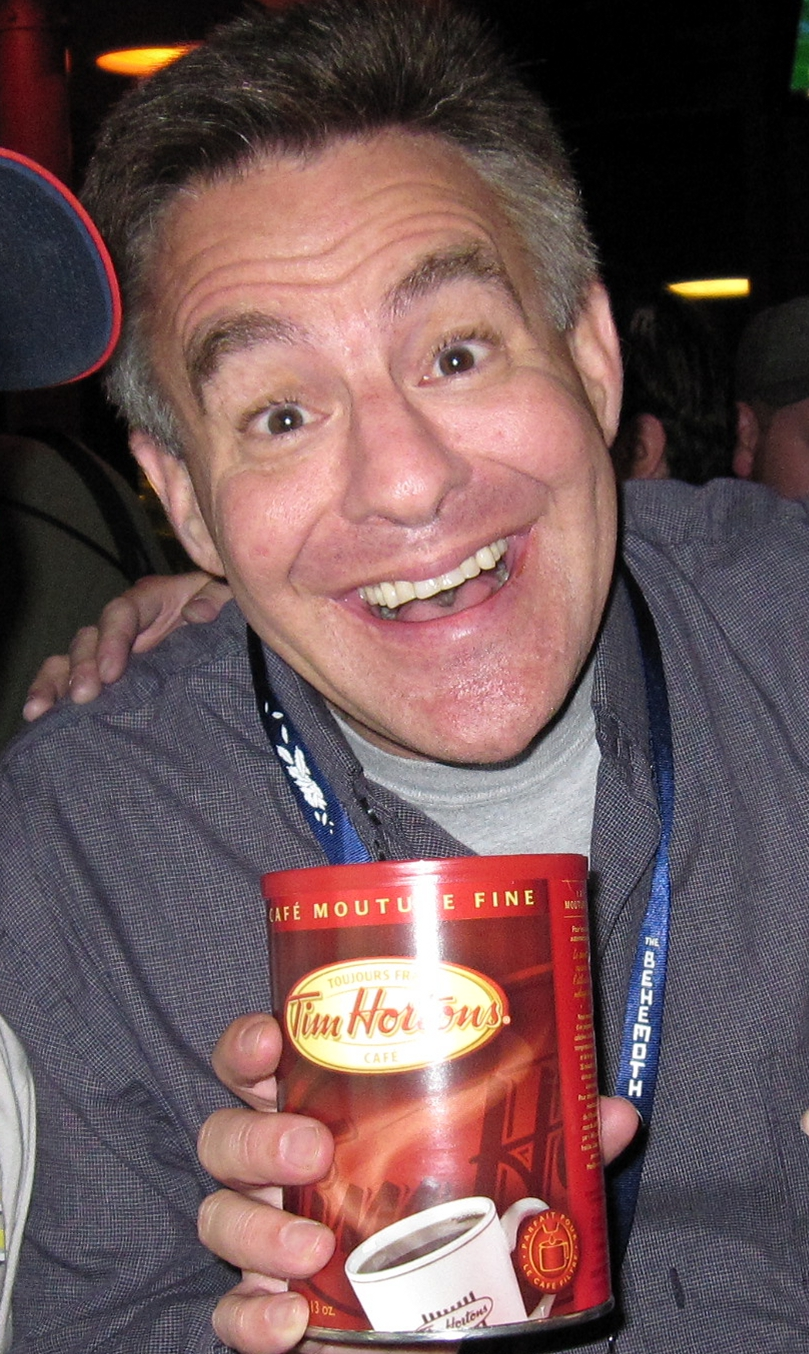
- Green in 2009
- Born: October 12, 1961 (age 65)
- Education: University of California, Berkeley (BA)
- Occupations: Writer, video game journalist, video game designer
- Employer(s): Hit Detection, formerly PopCap Games, Electronic Arts, Ziff Davis Media
- Known for: Editor-in-chief of Computer Gaming World and Games for Windows: The Official Magazine

Jeffrey Green (born October 12, 1961) is an American writer and video game journalist, and the last editor-in-chief of Games for Windows: The Official Magazine. In November 2013, Jeff left PopCap Games, where he served as a director of editorial and social media. He was employed by the Sims division of developer Electronic Arts, where he served as a designer, producer, and writer. Green kept his job at Ziff Davis after the closing of GFW for several months before announcing his departure from the company. While an employee at Ziff Davis, Green hosted the weekly CGW Radio podcast (which later became GFW Radio) and hosted The Official EA Podcast.

== Early career ==
Green graduated from the University of California, Berkeley with a degree in English. In 1991, he joined Ziff Davis Press, a subsidiary of Ziff Davis Media, which published computer books. Later, he moved to the weekly Macintosh trade journal MacWEEK as a review editor.

== Computer Gaming World ==
In 2001, Green was named editor-in-chief of Computer Gaming World. By 2004, all original staff at CGW when he first joined had left. Green contributed writing to The Art of Warcraft, published in 2002 by BradyGames, a book detailing the art and design of the Warcraft series of real-time strategy games. Looking back on the job as "essentially a shill job", Green procrastinated on his writing for Brady so long that the publisher reduced his pay for the work. Green considers the late nineties to be the "peak years" of the Computer Gaming World. Issues were over 300 pages in length, and because the Internet was not as prevalent then, "magazines were all that there were. If gamers wanted gaming news, you read the magazines".

=== Games for Windows: The Official Magazine ===
In August 2006, Ziff Davis announced that they would be partnering with Microsoft to rebrand Computer Gaming World as Games for Windows: The Official Magazine. The move was done in order to market the magazine to a wider audience. At the same time, Green insisted that the publication would remain a "hardcore PC gaming magazine", and that Microsoft would have no editorial influence on the magazine's content. In a June 2007 interview, Green said that gaming magazines were in a "period of transition", as the increasing prevalence of the Internet meant that print was no longer the primary source of information for enthusiasts. "We're all trying to figure out what that means, then—how to stay relevant, vital or even necessary at all." Green believes the rise of the "Digital Age" has forced print outlets to rethink how they produce content. The GFW staff considered how to write for an audience that regularly visits gaming websites, and how to write articles that are "better, different or deeper than what everyone has already done online, weeks before us".

=== Magazine closure ===
In April 2008, Ziff Davis announced that Games for Windows would be closing down. The magazine's seventeenth issue, the April/May 2008 issue featuring The Sims 3 on the cover, was its last. While the magazine's art team, Michael Jennings and Rosemary Pinkham, were laid off, the editorial staff, which included Green, as well as Shawn Elliott, Sean Molloy, and Ryan Scott, were kept as editors of 1UP.com. Specifically, the staff aimed to improve 1UP's coverage of PC games. Games for Windows relaunched in May 2008 as the "PC door" of 1UP.com, a section of the site dedicated to the coverage of computer games. It also served as an area to archive columns from CGW and GFW, such as Greenspeak and Tom vs. Bruce. Green became editor-in-chief of this part of the website. However, as time passed, Green found that he was less interested in contributing to the website than he was in the magazine.

The Web job itself—my regular job—in the post-magazine world turned out to be something of a mixed bag for me. While I saw Shawn and Ryan every day at the office and on the podcast, they were spun off into different directions when GFW closed, and so that close, a creative bond that Sean, Shawn, Ryan, and I had formed to make the magazine did not persist unfettered on the Web. We were not an "online version of the magazine." We were four guys absorbed into the greater good of the website...What became increasingly clear to me over the last few months...is that the concerns of a website, the concerns of this website, are not really my concerns at this point in my life.

Green announced in September 2008, that he would be leaving Ziff Davis and 1UP.com to pursue a career in game development at Electronic Arts. Specifically, Green would be working in the Sims department of EA, under the direction of designer Rod Humble. The two met when Humble was a guest on GFW Radio, and when considering where to work and who to work with, Humble was "at the top of my list". Green described him as being "a totally brilliant, smart, funny guy, and those are the kinds of people we like to be around."

== Electronic Arts ==
September 22, 2008 was Green's first official day as an employee of Electronic Arts. Green began contributing to an unannounced project, but within a month was transferred to another project. "I am seeing some of the volatility of the game biz." In November 2008, Green said he was helping to research future games in the SimAnimals line. Within six months of his employment at EA, Green had been moved to a new project three times. Green wrote dialogue and other text for SimAnimals and MySims Agents and helped promote MySims Agents at the 2009 Gamescom in Cologne, Germany.

Green has said that the transition from writing about games to making games was difficult, but that the work is "incredibly rewarding…simply for the fact that it is challenging me". The collaborative process of developing a game is what he has found most fascinating. "It becomes clearer and clearer to me just how complicated the business of making a game is, and the near miracle it is to get all the people involved aligned and understanding of what it is you're trying to do".

=== EA.com ===
On October 23, 2009, Green announced via Twitter that he had been named editor-in-chief of EA.com. Green further explained his new position at the company on his blog, saying that he would be producing new editorial content for Electronic Arts. At the same time, he wrote that this would not be a return to the games journalism field for him: "Let's not kid ourselves. I'm the EIC of a corporate website whose primary goal is to sell games." Jeff wrote on Twitter that his new role at the company would be "not quite PR, and not quite editorial. Some kind of odd hybrid".

=== EA departure ===
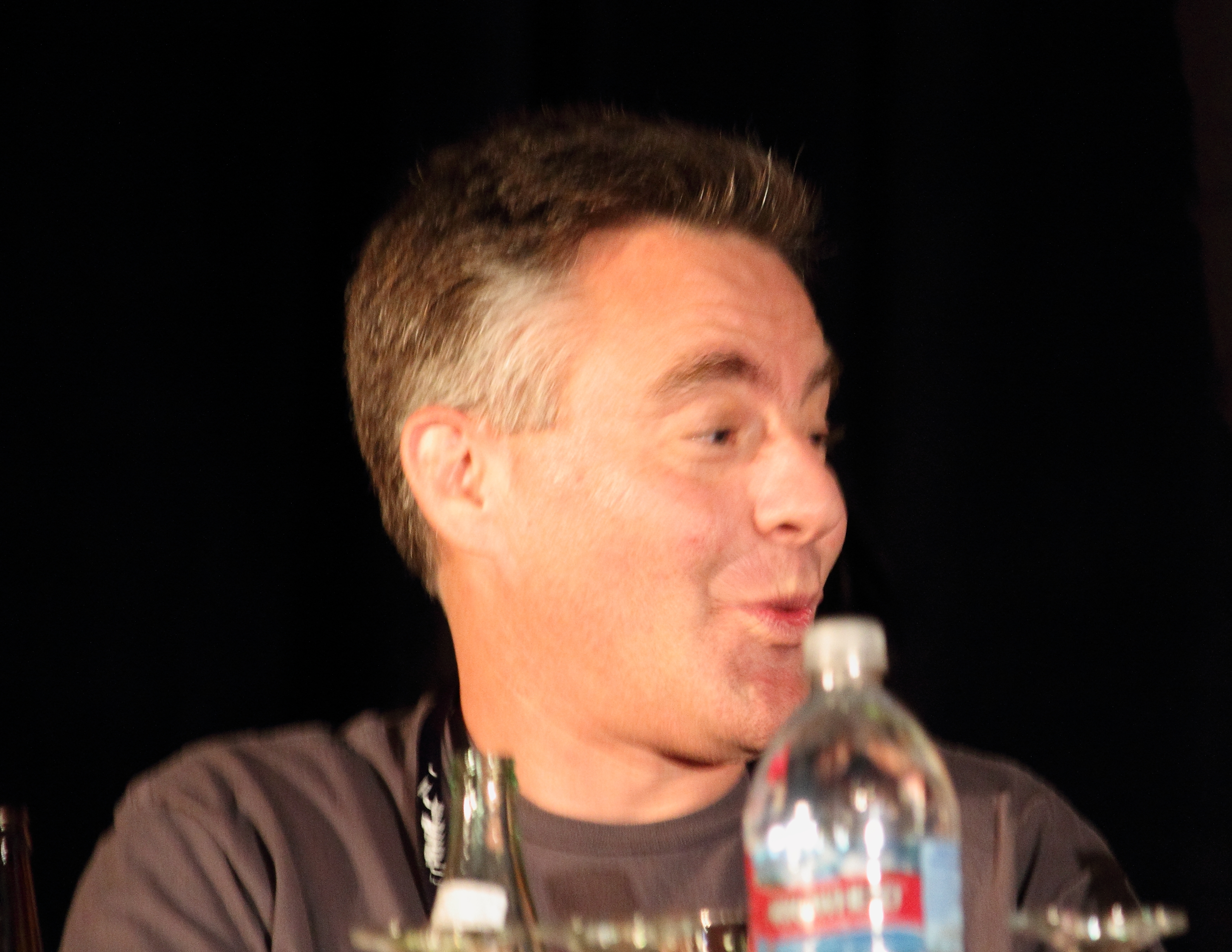
Green in attendance at PAX Prime 2010, shortly after his departure announcement

On August 14, 2010, Jeff Green updated his blog with the following:

I've left EA. The details of the hows and whys and wherefores are mostly better left unsaid, for all sorts of reasons. But to get the one thing out of the way that everyone wants to know—did he quit or was he fired—the answer is: Kind of neither. The folks who run the website wanted to change directions. That direction didn't include the creation of original content. So my job description was changed. And since what I do best (well, other than play games, eat pizza, and lay on the couch and do nothing) is create content, it clearly was no longer the best fit for me. So I'm out.

== Podcasting ==
Green has hosted and appeared on a number of podcasts. The first episode of CGW Radio was released on February 16, 2006, hosted by Green, and featured a cast of editors from Computer Gaming World. The magazine's staff, made to produce a show along with other Ziff Davis publications, including Electronic Gaming Monthly and Official PlayStation Magazine, initially approached the idea with apprehension. "The podcast started out as something alien and unwanted to us, but then quickly morphed into something we loved, as we realized the opportunities it gave us to entertain folks and connect with our audience in an entirely different, and much more immediate way." CGW Radio was renamed to GFW Radio with the rebranding of Computer Gaming World as Games for Windows: The Official Magazine. GFW Radio developed a "fiercely dedicated listener base" over the years. The show's last episode came after Green's departure from Ziff Davis, as well as that of GFW editor Shawn Elliott.

At Electronic Arts, Green approached his employers with the prospect of creating an EA-centric podcast. Green believed hosting a podcast would allow him to utilize past talents developed at Ziff Davis while hosting CGW Radio and GFW Radio. On his blog, Green wrote that while such a podcast would promote Electronic Arts products, he would strive to create a well-produced show. "So, while, yes, from the perspective of my employers the goal, of course, is to "sell" EA, for me, the goal is to actually have a good show that I can be proud of and that you will want to listen to." The first episode of the EA podcast was released on June 19, 2009. Green is also a regular on Out of the Game, a podcast featuring current and former game journalists, including Green, Shawn Elliott, Robert Ashley, N'Gai Croal, and Luke Smith.

Jeff Green has appeared as a special guest on Giant Bomb's Giant Bombcast (on Aug 17, 2010, Dec 14, 2010, and Nov 12, 2013) and on Episode 87 of RebelFM.

== Personal life ==
Green lives in Berkeley, California with his wife and daughter, and has written game reviews for Games for Windows in the past. Green is in the process of writing his first novel, The Cudgel of Xanthor. The book is based on a column he once wrote which was a parody of video game previews. In the book, a video game development company is working on the third installment of the Xanthor series of games – the first two being the Blade of Xanthor, and the Sword of Xanthor. Green has stated in podcasts that his inspiration for the book derived from his two years working for Electronic Arts where he saw, first-hand, how games are developed. The book cuts back and forth between the company and Xanthor himself, living in the world the developers are creating. Xanthor must deal in his own world with the myriad and arbitrary changes the developers make. Jeff stated in a 2013 interview that he ceased working on it.
