= Techstorm =

Asian pay TV channel

TechStorm
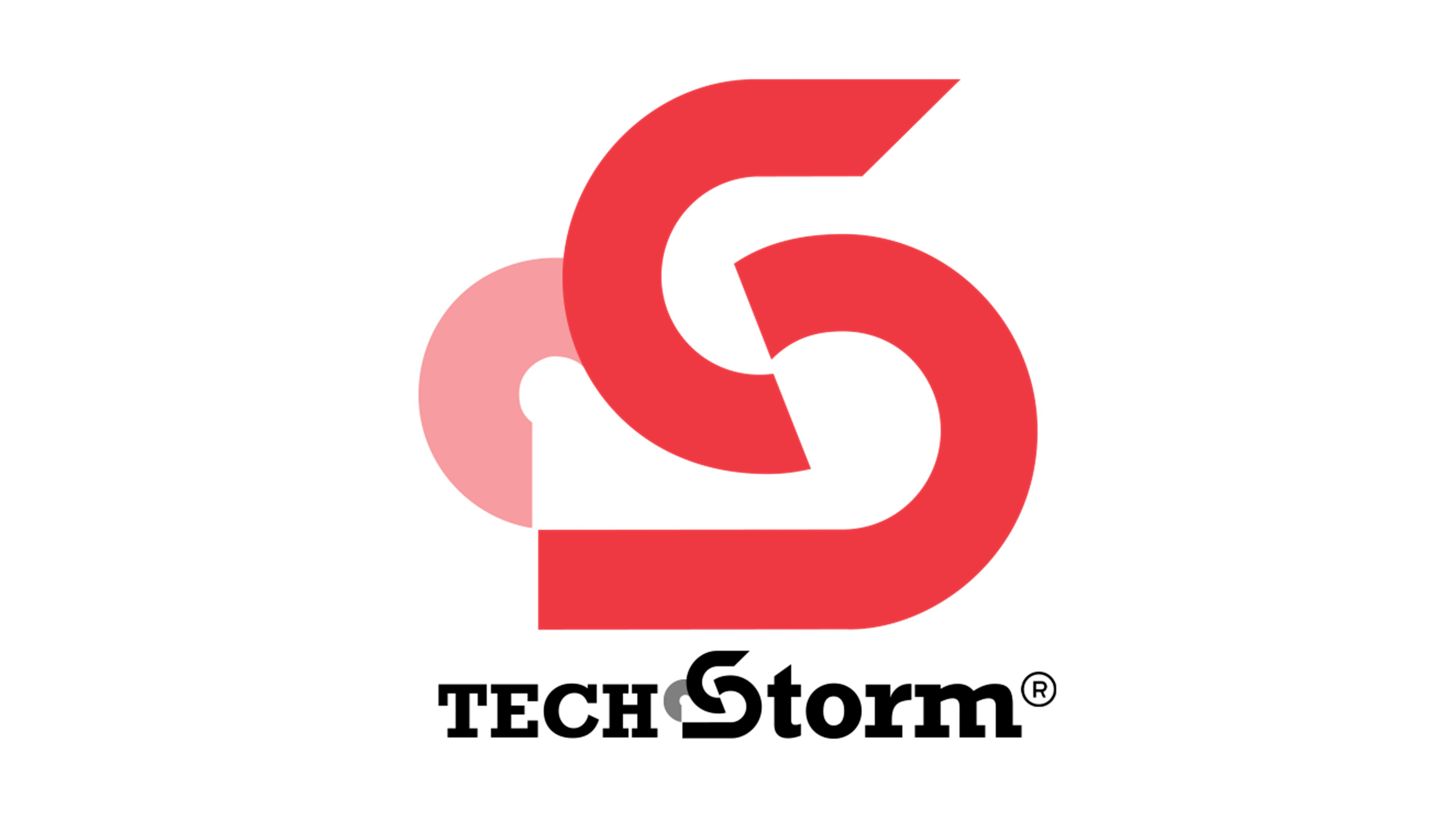
- Type: Pay TV
- Country: Singapore

Ownership
- Owner: TechTV Network Pte Ltd
- Key people: Debbie Lee (CEO)

History
- Founded: 24 March 2019; 7 years ago
- Launched: 25 March 2019; 7 years ago

Links
- Website: www.techstorm.tv

TechStorm is a pay TV channel that carries Asian esports and tech-centric content. It debuted on StarHub and Singtel in 2019 and 2020 respectively The channel is owned and operated by TechTV Network Pte Ltd in Singapore. It was founded by Singaporean Debbie Lee.

It partnered with Nanyang Technological University in adopting automatic content recognition (ACR) technology.

In 2025, the company behind the channel, TechTV, was investigated by the Ministry of Manpower for possible offences under the Employment Act, including unpaid salaries.

== Programming ==
Programming seen on TechStorm includes:

- Gamerz
- Innovation Nation
- Meet The Drapers Show
- Nintendo Quest
- Shark Tank Australia
- Storm Bytes –original production
