= Lego The Hobbit =

2014 video game

- Developers: Traveller's Tales; TT Fusion (handheld)
- Publishers: Warner Bros. Interactive Entertainment; Feral Interactive (OS X)
- Directors: Jon Burton; James McLoughlin
- Producer: Randhir Jutley
- Designer: Jon Burton
- Programmer: Steve Harding
- Artist: Leon Warren
- Composers: Ian Livingstone; Rob Westwood; Original music composed by Howard Shore
- Platforms: Microsoft Windows; Nintendo 3DS; PlayStation 3; PlayStation 4; PlayStation Vita; Xbox 360; Xbox One; Wii U; OS X
- Release: NA: 8 April 2014; EU: 11 April 2014; AU: 17 April 2014; Wii U: EU: 11 April 2014; NA: 22 April 2014; AU: 7 May 2014; OS X: WW: 18 December 2014
- Genre: Action-adventure
- Modes: Single-player, multiplayer

Lego The Hobbit is a 2014 Lego-themed action-adventure video game developed by Traveller's Tales. The game was released by Warner Bros. Interactive Entertainment on 8 April 2014 in North America, and 11 April in Europe. The game is a follow-up to Lego The Lord of the Rings based on the first two Hobbit films; An Unexpected Journey and The Desolation of Smaug. It was released on PlayStation 3, PlayStation 4, PlayStation Vita, Xbox 360, Xbox One, Wii U, Nintendo 3DS, OS X and Microsoft Windows.

On 1 January 2019, all digital sales of the PS3 and Xbox 360 version of the game were halted. This was confirmed a few days later by publisher Warner Bros. Interactive. The game was later re-added to Steam on 27 April 2020 and on console stores on 6 May 2020.

== Gameplay ==
The game shows several features from the previous games, including a feature where the user should locate specific materials to build a big Lego object. When the user selects and input the correct materials a screen is displayed where the Lego machine is built and the player should select the correct pieces in exchange for studs.

The characters have different actions to perform, making the Dwarf Company a group with different capabilities during the mission, including someone with archery abilities, another that uses a big hammer that can move big objects, another with the ability to extract minerals from stones, and so on. Bilbo improves his abilities as the game advances: when he gains Sting he has the ability to be a more skilled fighter; and when he gets the One Ring he can disappear and build invisible Lego structures.

The game, similar to the latest Lego video games, is composed on a large map, rather than a single hub. The player can move among different events where different characters ask the player to retain a specific material from a mission or to exchange materials.

== Plot ==
Much like its predecessors, the game presents storylines from The Hobbit films: An Unexpected Journey and Desolation of Smaug. However, the developers modified the storylines to fit the events into a number of game chapters per film, as well as adding the humour the series has become known for.

== Downloadable content ==
There are 4 DLCs that are included with the game: "The Big Little Character Pack", "Side Quest Character Pack", "The Armory Pack" and "The Battle Pack".

=== Cancelled The Battle of the Five Armies DLC ===
It was reported at the London Toy Fair in January 2014 that a DLC would be released covering the events of the final film in The Hobbit series, to be released around the time of the film at the end of that year. However, no DLC was released. Over a year later, in a correspondence with GameSpot it was revealed that, despite no actual cancellation of the DLC, there were no longer any plans to adapt the film as a DLC, nor to adapt it as another game.

== Reception ==
Reception

Aggregate score
Aggregator	Score
Metacritic	(PS4) 72/100 (X360) 70/100 (PC) 68/100 (XONE) 69/100

Review scores
Publication	Score
Destructoid	6.5/10
Eurogamer	6/10
Game Informer	8/10
GameSpot	5/10
GamesRadar+	3.5/5
IGN	7.4/10
Nintendo Life	4/10
Official Xbox Magazine (US)	6/10
Polygon	8/10
SKOAR!	55/100
