= Games magazine =

Games magazine may refer to:

- Games, an American magazine about general games later merged into Games World of Puzzles
- GamesTM, a British video games magazine
- List of game magazines and Category:Game magazines
