= Nintendo La Rivista Ufficiale =

Former Italian video game magazine

- Editor: Sprea Media Italy
- Categories: Games magazine
- Frequency: Monthly
- Format: 27x30 cm (2002-2003); 23,3x25,8 cm (2003-2007); 20,2x28,6 cm (2007-2013)
- Publisher: Xenia
- First issue: 2002
- Final issue Number: July 2013; 142
- Company: Sprea Media Italy
- Country: Italy
- Based in: Milan, Italy
- Language: Italian
- Website: Nintendo La Rivista Ufficiale

Nintendo La Rivista Ufficiale (from Italian: Nintendo The Official Magazine), also known by the acronym NRU, was the Italian edition of Official Nintendo video game magazine, specializing in all Nintendo video game consoles and handheld gaming platforms. The magazine featured previews, reviews, and cheat codes for Nintendo games.

== History ==
Launched in 2002 by Future Media Italy, a division of Future Publishing, and from February 2007 Nintendo La Rivista Ufficiale was published by the Italian publishing house Sprea Media Italy.

Previously, from November 1998 to around the beginning of 2002, the official Italian magazine of Nintendo had been Official Nintendo Magazine, published by Xenia Edizioni. The monthly then closed suddenly, according to the former editor-in-chief due to a lack of agreement between Xenia and Nintendo Italy. The National Library Service of Italy regards Nintendo Official Magazine as a continuation of that same magazine.

Among the most important news announced by the magazine we find the innovative consoles Nintendo DS (NRU 28, July 2004), Wii (NRU 41, July 2005), Nintendo 3DS (NRU 115, April 2011) and Wii U (NRU 135, December 2012).

In 2003, initially as a supplement to NRU, Game Boy Advance la Rivista Ufficiale was born, dedicated only to the Game Boy Advance portable console and released irregularly for a few issues until 2005, when the name was replaced by Nintendo DS la Rivista Ufficiale, dedicated to the Nintendo DS.

In July 2013 Nintendo Italy announced the closure of the magazine after 11 years of activity. Issue 142 of the magazine was the last to be published by Sprea Media, with the consequent abandonment of the historical editorial staff. Nintendo tried to find a new publisher but failed, thus declaring the end of the magazine. This was the second official Nintendo magazine to close in less than a year, the first being the US-based Nintendo Power.

== See also ==
- List of magazines in Italy
