= Book smart =

Book smart is an adjective describing a person who learns greatly from books, as opposed to practical experience, or 'street smarts'. (It may also be used as a noun, as in, "She has book smarts.") It may also refer to:

- Booksmart, a 2019 comedy film
- BookSmart, a bookmaking software created by Blurb, Inc. now known as BookWright
- BookSmart, a bookstore in San Pedro Garza Garcia, Mexico.

== See also ==
- Know-how
