= Blurb, Inc. =

Book publishing platform

Blurb Inc.
- Type: Private
- Industry: Self-publishing
- Founded: 2005; 21 years ago
- Founder: Eileen Gittins
- Headquarters: San Francisco, California, U.S.
- Key people: Rix Kramlich (CEO); Eileen Gittins (chairman)
- Products: BookWright, Blurb plug-in for Adobe InDesign, Blurb iOS app, BookSmart, Blurb PDF Uploader, Blurb book module in Adobe Lightroom Classic
- Number of employees: 120
- Parent: Reischling Press (RPI)
- Website: www.blurb.com

Blurb Inc. is an American self-publishing platform that allows users to create, self-publish, promote, share, and sell their own print and ebooks. It also offers software for laying out books. The company was founded in San Francisco in 2005 by the technology entrepreneur and photographer Eileen Gittins and opened to the public in 2006.

== History ==
The company was founded in 2005 by Eileen Gittins and funded by Canaan Partners and Anthem Venture Partners. Blurb's headquarters are in San Francisco, California.

The company generates nearly $100 million in revenues per year.

Blurb announced a partnership with Amazon in April 2014. The deal allows Blurb-designed books to be sold and distributed on the Amazon platform. The partnership enables self-publishing on the platform with a 15% cut on Blurb books.

In May 2014 Blurb acquired MagCloud, a self-publishing platform for magazines, under a licensing agreement from HP. In the deal, Blurb took over the company's technology and operations.

In January 2016 Gittins stepped down as chief executive to become executive chairman and was succeeded by Todd Larsen, a former president of news and sports at Time Inc..

Blurb was acquired by their print fulfillment partner Reischling Press, Inc. (RPI) for an undisclosed amount in August 2020. RPI had been working with Blurb since 2005 and has been printing most of its volume over the years. Blurb's chief executive Rix Kramlich became general manager of a new e-commerce division of RPI, and Blurb kept its offices in San Francisco and the United Kingdom.

== Awards ==
- Time magazine named Blurb one of 2006's "50 Coolest Web Sites".
- In April 2008, Blurb was nominated for a 2008 Webby Award.
- In August 2010, Blurb was announced as 2010 AOP Open Award Winner.
- Blurb was an Inc. 500 No. 1 media company in 2010.
