= Digit (magazine) =

Indian technology magazine

- October 2009 issue
- Executive Editor: Jayesh Shinde
- Former editors: Robert Sovereign-Smith
- Categories: Technology
- Frequency: Monthly
- Circulation: 230,000
- Publisher: Times Network; BCCL
- First issue: June 2001 (25 years, 5 months and 2 days ago)
- Company: Bennett, Coleman & Company Limited (BCCL)
- Country: India
- Based in: Mumbai, Delhi
- Language: English
- Website: www.digit.in

Digit is an Indian technology media publisher (magazine and website) owned by the Bennett, Coleman & Company Limited (BCCL), under Times Network Digit provides technology articles in eight different Indian regional languages: English, Hindi, Bangla, Kannada, Malayalam, Marathi, Tamil, and Telugu.

== Digit Magazine ==
Digit Magazine is a monthly Indian technology magazine, originally launched in June 2001 by Jasubhai Digital Media.

In December 2007, 9.9 Mediaworx acquired Jasubhai Digital Media, including Digit Magazine and its gaming supplement, SKOAR! and all the other properties associated with the brand.

In 2008, the Indian Readership Survey (IRS) voted Digit as the most popular technology magazine in India.

In 2011, Digit was estimated to have a monthly readership of about 230,000 people.

In May, 2024, Times Network, under Bennett, Coleman & Company Limited (BCCL), went on to acquire Digit, including its website, magazine, and all related properties from the 9.9 Group.

== Digit awards ==
Each year, Digit presents awards to the best Indian technology firms and products.

== See also ==
- CFO India
