= PC Mania =

Pcmania.bg
- Website type: Computer games
- Website: www.pcmania.bg
- Registration: No
- Launched: 2009

PC Mania Magazine
- PC Mania cover 12/2008
- Categories: Games magazine
- Frequency: Monthly
- Circulation: ~15,000
- First issue: June 1998
- Final issue: March 2009
- Company: PC Mania
- Country: Bulgaria
- Based in: Sofia
- Language: Bulgarian
- Website: www.pcmania.bg

PC Mania is a Bulgarian computer games media originally started as a computer magazine and transformed into on-line game media in the beginning of 2009. It is a prime Bulgarian on-line media source for gaming, Internet, and technology. It was established in 1998 and was the third Bulgarian computer games magazine after the brochure Top Games and the magazines Master Games and Gamers' Workshop. It is the oldest computer games media in the country and is indisputably the most popular media for computer entertainment in Bulgaria, having the biggest circulation and biggest readers span when it was distributed in paper version. The articles concern topics such as personal computer hardware, Internet technologies, computer and console games, news, etc.

PC Mania Magazine celebrated its 10th anniversary in 2008 and shortly after a major overhaul was carried out. In the spring of 2009 the magazine moved entirely on-line. The existing web page had been completely redesigned and expanded in order to better suit the needs the growing gaming community in Bulgaria. Improving upon user feedback, readers were able to comment directly under the news and articles posted, as well as to discuss different topics on the designated forum. As of May 2009 pcmania.bg had approximately 45,000 unique weekly visitors, which positions the website on top of the most popular computer games web-media in Bulgaria and on 10th position in "Media and Information" websites for the country, and 19th position overall.

== Features ==
Game articles: previews, interviews, and reviews of new and upcoming games as well as game guides. The articles encompass PC, PS3, Xbox 360 and mobile games

News: latest news from the video game industry and technology

Topic of the week: an in-depth analyses of current gaming- and technology related issues

Personal opinion: editorials by PC Mania's team on different subjects

Hardware articles: reviews of computers, laptops, and other technology equipment
