= Luke Smith (writer) =

American video game journalist and developer

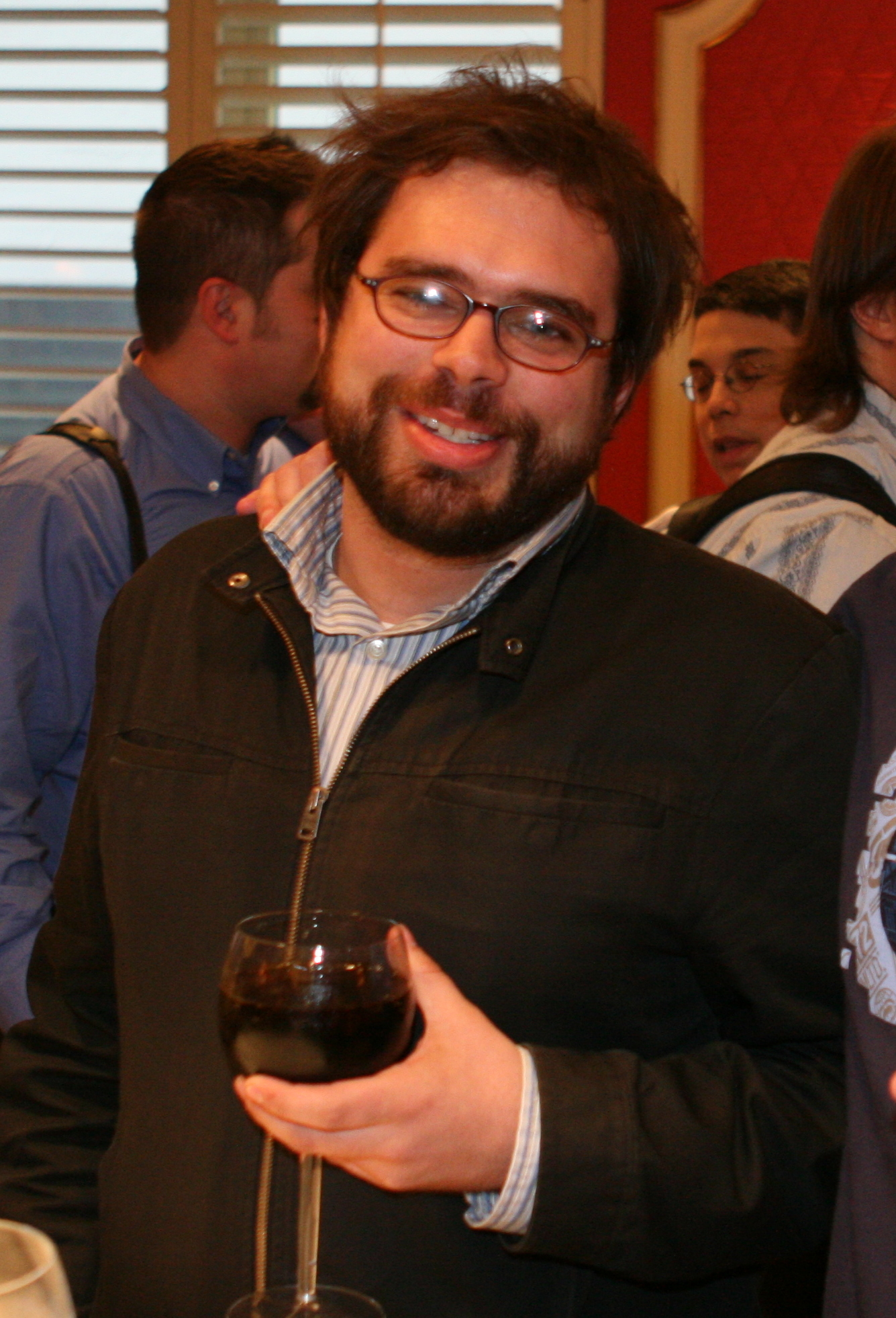
- Smith in 2007
- Born: c. 1980 (age c. 45)
- Education: University of Michigan
- Occupation: Content Editor/Community Manager
- Employer: Bungie
- Known for: Video game journalism

Luke Michael Smith (born c. 1980) is an American writer. He was a staff member at the video game development company Bungie, and is a former video games journalist. Smith wrote for a college newspaper and weekly papers in Michigan before being hired as one of the first new freelance writers for Kotaku. At Kotaku, Smith developed his writing style but soon left the site for a staff position as 1Up.com's news editor. Smith made a name for himself at 1Up, particularly through an article he wrote focusing on problems with the game Halo 2.

Smith was known for his direct approach to game journalism and scathing criticism of the video game industry. During his time at 1Up the site developed a greater profile and stepped out of its sister publication's shadow, but Smith grew frustrated with the contemporary state of gaming news and what he considered manipulation of journalists and readers into accepting promotional material as news. In April 2007 he left 1Up to become a Bungie writer and co-host of the developer's podcast.

== Early career ==
Smith gradually entered into game journalism while working on an English Literature degree at the University of Michigan, writing about media in the college newspaper. After graduation, he worked for weekly papers in Dearborn and Detroit, Michigan, including Real Detroit Weekly.

Clive Thompson, a games writer with Slate, interacted with Smith over AOL Instant Messenger and the two began to bounce ideas off of each other for their respective writing projects; when games blog Kotaku started to expand from one writer (founder Brian Crecente), Thompson recommended Smith. Smith credits his time at Kotaku for helping him come into his own, develop his style and learn about attribution and citing sources, but he left after a short period of time. "At the time stories (on Kotaku) were unsigned. Kotaku was like the Brian Crecente vision. If I posted something or [fellow writer Brian Ashcraft] did people thought [Crecente] did. Also, there was no health insurance, it was just full-time freelance."

== 1UP.com journalism ==
Smith served as the news editor for 1Up.com, the sister site to the magazine Electronic Gaming Monthly. During his tenure at 1Up, Smith wrote extensively about the Halo video game franchise, as was considered a leading fan voice; in one article, he declared Halo was the only game series he cared about. Smith wrote a feature story for 1UP in 2005 called "Broken Halo", in which he explained how developer Bungie could fix problems he perceived with the game; Crecente said the article put Smith "on the map". Smith also became one of the panelists of the 1Up Yours show, a weekly video games podcast featuring gaming editors and experts. In 2006, Edge named him one of gaming's top 50 journalists.

Play.d magazine credited Smith with inspiring gamers to learn more about the game industry and not accept company promotion, as well as turning 1UP from "the bastard child of EGM" to an important part of the Ziff Davis Internet company's gaming network. His style has been described as a "robust, direct approach" to journalism and is known for his scathing attacks on the industry. Smith, however, felt disheartened by the state of game journalism. "Video game journalism is just weird. You have guys married to women in marketing for the games they cover. Video game journalism is still very young, very early, still trying to find out what it is," he said. In an interview with Michael Zenke of The Escapist, Smith said he felt game journalists were treated by developers as another part of the PR plan, with developers sending out information and the journalists "regurgitating" it. Worse, Smith felt that gamers had become used to this sort of information; "We have to be responsible for our actions and held accountable when we manipulate the expectations of gamers," he told Zenke.

While he was becoming more frustrated with the field at 1UP, game developer Bungie contacted Smith about employment. After sending the company his resume, Smith stopped writing about Bungie and Microsoft to avoid a conflict of interest. Smith accepted a job offer a month later.

== Bungie ==
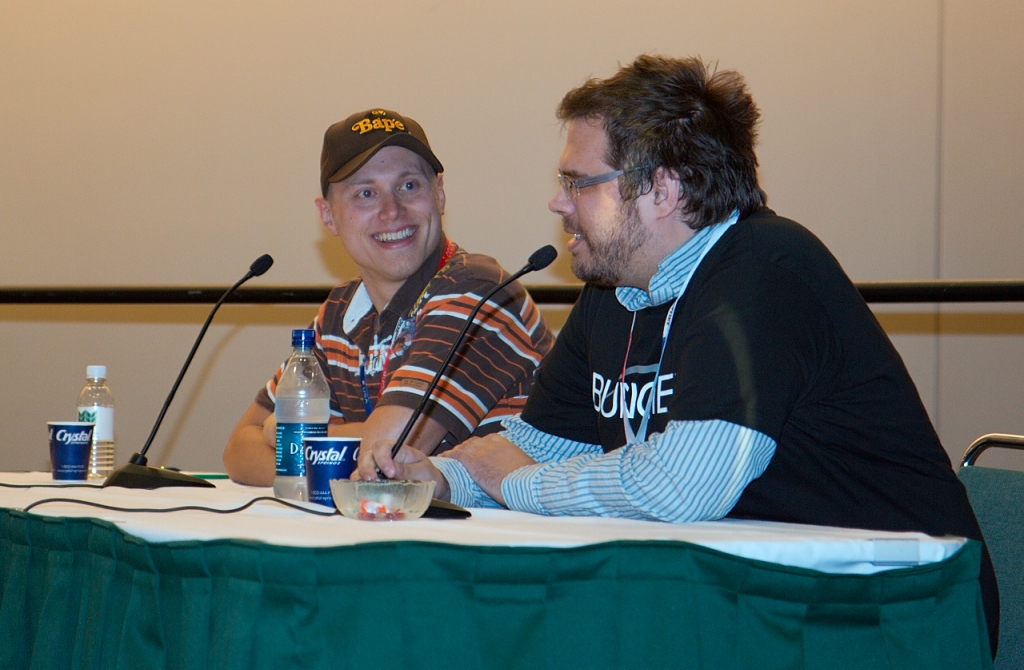
Smith (right) and Shane Bettenhausen at a 1Up Yours panel

In April 2007, Smith announced on a 1UP podcast he was leaving the site to work for Bungie. Reaction to Smith's announcement varied; some were happy or sad to see him leave, while others felt he had "sold out." Smith joined the ranks of other former game journalists who left to work for game companies, including 1UP expatriate Che Chou, who joined Microsoft Game Studios, and former GameSpot chief Greg Kasavin, who became an associate producer for Electronic Arts.

Bungie staff hinted in a weekly update that Smith might play a role in the developer's podcast. Smith officially began work on May 7, 2007, as content editor, providing fans and the Bungie readership with information about Bungie's game and staff. Smith believed that there was a special opportunity for game developers, "for someone to come in and tell the stories that people want to know [...] Right now you have four bridges between developer and reader: Developer to PR, to journalist to reader. [This position] could get rid of those middle two bridges."

While Bungie had historically been good at letting fans interact via forums and provided updates and artwork via their site, Bungie, the company's releases had a "corporate and muted tone to it," and made less effort and been less successful historically at providing access to the inner workings of the game studio. As part of a change to become more transparent, Bungie took steps repeated throughout the industry to allow fans more say and recruiting respected voices from the community—namely, Smith. Robertson credited Smith's tenure as aiding Bungie's greater focus on, "building, supporting and learning from the Halo 3 community." He is credited as a writer on Halo 3.

Smith also hosted Bungie's podcast show along with co-host Brian Jarrard; in an interview with his former coworkers at 1UP, Smith said of the Bungie podcast, "we [Bungie] are focusing on getting our listeners and fans familiar with a bunch of the different faces at Bungie studios." Brought back after close to a year-long hiatus, the podcast featured Bungie news and interviews with staff members about their jobs and working at the studio. Smith had the title of "Bungie Community Manager" at Bungie, and has given interviews with the press about the company's recent products, including Halo 3: ODST. Smith was among other writers-turned-game developers who held a discussion on the topic at the 2009 Game Developers Conference. Smith worked on player investment for Halo: Reach.

He worked as design lead on Bungie's 2014 video game Destiny and was director on the Taken King expansion. When development on Destiny 2 was rebooted and the game delayed to 2017, Smith was brought on as game director. He remained in that position until 2020, when he was moved to an executive position to oversee the Destiny IP. Smith was let go by Bungie in July 2024, amidst layoffs that affected 17% of the company's workforce. Smith had been working on a Destiny spinoff game, codenamed "Payback", before it was cancelled.
