= Inc. (magazine) =

American business media company

- September 2023 issue
- Editor: Mike Hofman
- Categories: Business
- Frequency: 4 times per year
- Total circulation: 653,189 (June 2019)
- First issue: April 1979; 47 years ago
- Company: Mansueto Ventures, LLC
- Country: United States
- Based in: New York City, New York, U.S.
- Language: English
- Website: www.inc.com
- ISSN: 0162-8968

Inc. is an American business media company founded in 1979 and based in New York City. Inc. publishes several print magazine issues per year, and is anchored by journalistic content online and on social media, focused on entrepreneurship and related news. Inc. also produces several live and virtual events yearly, including the Inc. 5000 conference.

Owned by Mansueto Ventures, Inc. is best known for its annual rankings of the fastest-growing privately held companies in the United States, called the "Inc. 5000" as well as its Best in Business, Female Founders, and Best Workplaces awards.

== History ==
=== Founding and early years ===
Inc. launched as an American business magazine in Boston by Bernie Goldhirsh, focusing on growing companies, startups, and entrepreneurship. Its first issue appeared in April 1979. The magazine was headquartered in Boston's waterfront on the India Wharf, relocating to NYC in the early 2000s. Goldhirsh was an MIT-trained mechanical engineer who had previously founded Sail magazine, which he sold for $10 million in 1980. Paul W. Kellam, who had joined Goldhirsh's company as editor of Marine Business, was one of Inc.'s first editors. Goldhirsh kept a low profile, and George Gendron, who served as editor-in-chief from 1980 to 2002, was considered the "public face" of the magazine. He was later succeeded by John Koten and Jane Berentson.

In 1980, Inc. hired as a columnist MIT director David Birch, who was one of the first to recognize that small and new businesses created the majority of jobs in the U.S.

In October 1981, Inc. became the first magazine to feature Steve Jobs on its cover, alongside the proclamation, "This man has changed business forever." The early profile focused on Jobs' impact on the personal computer industry and Apple's rise as a key player. It enhanced the company's public image and recognized Jobs as a significant figure in the business world.

In 1982, the magazine began publishing its Inc. 100 ranking to showcase the fastest-growing privately held companies in the United States, which later became Inc. 500 and then the Inc. 5000.

In 2000, Goldhirsh sold the magazine to German publishing house Gruner + Jahr for a reported price of over $200 million. In 2005, Joe Mansueto, founder of investment research firm Morningstar Ventures, bought Inc. and another business title, Fast Company, for about $35 million, forming publishing company Mansueto Ventures.

=== 2010s–2020s ===
In December 2013, Eric Schurenberg was appointed president and editor-in-chief of Inc., replacing the long-tenured Jane Berentson. In March 2018, Schurenberg was appointed CEO of Mansueto Ventures, and Jim Ledbetter was promoted to editor-in-chief of Inc. Ledbetter was later succeeded by Scott Omelianuk and Mike Hofman, who currently serves as editor in chief.

Inc. Uncensored podcast won the 2016 and 2017 Best of the Web Awards for Best Podcast, along with a 2018 Folio: Eddie & Ozzie Award honorable mention.

Inc. received multiple Folio awards in 2017 and 2018, including honors for full-print issues, best redesign, use of video, and use of social media. Its 2016 feature, "The Stealthy Sales Kings of Amazon", won a Best in Business award from the Society for Advancing Business Writing and Editing.

In 2023, Inc. won The Society of Publication Designer's silver medal for Feature Profile, Non-celebrity Story for "Computer Freaks", published in May–June 2023.

== Operations ==
Inc. is a sister publication to Fast Company, both published under Mansueto Ventures, owned by Joe Mansueto. Stephanie Mehta is currently the CEO of Mansueto Ventures, which is now headquartered in New York City at 7 World Trade Center.

Inc. focuses on entrepreneurship, startups, small businesses, and business growth. It provides insights, advice, special reports, and resources for business owners, entrepreneurs, and professionals building their companies, as well as daily news on money, tech, and management. Inc.'s online platform consists of Inc.com, the Inc. app, and the Inc. 5000 Community.

It publishes books under the imprint An Inc. Original in partnership with Greenleaf Book Group.

Inc. produces a weekly, award-winning podcasts on which Inc. journalists discuss startups, technology, market and industry trends, and more.

The magazine hosts several events, including the annual Inc. 5000 Conference & Awards Ceremony, which celebrates the Inc. 5000 and allows honorees, alumni, and other growth-minded entrepreneurs to learn and network.

=== Editors-in-chief ===
- George Gendron – 1980–2002
- John Koten – 2002–2005
- Jane Berentson – 2005–2012
- Eric Schurenberg – 2012–2018
- James Ledbetter – 2018–2019
- Scott Omelianuk – 2020–2024
- Mike Hofman – 2024–present

== Initiatives ==
As of 2024, Inc. has 5 ongoing recognition programs: Inc. 500 and Inc. 5000, (annual lists ranking the fastest-growing privately held companies in the U.S.), Best Workplaces, Female Founders, and Best in Business.

- Inc. 500 and Inc. 5000: Annual lists ranking the fastest-growing privately held companies in the U.S.
- Best Workplaces: This program, started in 2016, is an annual list compiled by Inc. magazine that recognizes US companies with exceptional workplace cultures. These rankings are based on aspects such as company culture, employee benefits, professional development opportunities, work-life balance, and overall employee satisfaction. It highlights organizations that prioritize their employees' well-being and foster a positive work culture.
- Female Founders: Launched in 2018, this annual list recognizes influential female entrepreneurs who have made significant impacts in their industries. Notable recipients include women who have founded groundbreaking companies and initiatives.
- Best in Business: Launched in 2020, this annual list honors companies that have made extraordinary contributions to their industries and society. Recognized companies demonstrate innovation, growth, and a commitment to positive impact.

Past initiatives included:

- Entrepreneur of the Year: an award~~,~~ Inc. co-produced in partnership with Ernst & Young, starting in 1986, celebrating ambitious entrepreneurs whose ingenuity and leadership have driven their companies’ success and transformed industries.
- Inner City 100: highlighted successful businesses in inner cities, launched in collaboration with Michael Porter in 1997, focusing on underserved markets and fostering economic growth.
- Open Book Management: Promoted by John Case through Inc., this concept encouraged companies to share financial information with employees to drive engagement and performance.

Inc. magazine publishes several podcasts, including:

- From the Ground Up (formerly Inc. Uncensored): A weekly podcast by veteran business journalists from Inc. and Inc.com, covering startups, entrepreneurship, technology, and high-growth businesses. It has been running since 2015.
- For Starters with Alexa von Tobel: Launched in 2019, this podcast features conversations with entrepreneurs about their journeys, challenges, and the strategies they used to build successful companies.
- Computer Freaks: Hosted by Christine Haughney Dare-Bryan, this podcast covers the stories of pioneers in the computer industry and their impact on technology and business.
- Founders Project: Began as an editorial initiative led by the magazine staff, it later became a podcast hosted by Alexa von Tobel starting in 2019. The project showcases the stories of entrepreneurs.

== Inc. 5000 ==
In April 1979, the inaugural issue of Inc. featured the 'Inc. 100,' a list of the fastest-growing, publicly held small companies. By 1982, this list had expanded to the 'Inc. 500,' ranking companies based on their overall revenue growth over a three-year period. The top 500 companies are featured in the September issue of Inc. magazine each year, highlighting their significant growth and achievements in the private sector of the United States.

Inc. 5000 was first presented in 2007, expanding the Inc. 500. It lists the 5,000 fastest-growing private companies in the U.S. This list ranks these companies based on their revenue growth rate. It categorizes the fastest-growing companies by industry, metro area, revenue, and number of employees.

To be eligible, privately owned companies must demonstrate three years of revenue growth among other criteria. Once included in the Inc. 5000, these companies are invited to a three-day Inc. conference. While all 5,000 companies are profiled on Inc.com, only the top 500 gain the spotlight in the September issue of Inc. magazine.

The Inc. Regionals are a series of annual rankings published by Inc. magazine that identify the fastest-growing privately held companies within specific regions of the United States. Introduced as localized counterparts to the national Inc. 5000 list, the regional rankings evaluate companies based on their percentage revenue growth over a multi-year period. Each edition highlights high-growth businesses within defined geographic areas - such as the Northeast, Southeast, Midwest, Southwest, Pacific, Rocky Mountain, and Texas - using the same methodology applied to the national list but tailored to regional economic ecosystems.

== Awards ==
- ASME Awards:
  - 2012: General Excellence
  - 2014: Reporting
- SABEW Awards:
  - 2012 Best in Business Honoree for Turntable.fm
  - 2016 Best in Business Honoree for "The Stealthy Sales Kings of Amazon"

== See also ==
- Inc. India
