= MagCloud =

American ebook supplier

- Company type: Subsidiary
- Genre: Vanity press
- Founded: 2008
- Founder: Hewlett-Packard
- Number of locations: U.S.
- Area served: Global
- Key people: Andrew Bolwell
- Services: Self-publishing
- Owner: Blurb, Inc. (2014-present); Hewlett-Packard (2008-2014)
- Number of employees: 17
- Website: www.magcloud.com

MagCloud is an American online publishing service founded by Hewlett-Packard in 2008 and sold to Blurb, Inc. in 2014. Mag is an abbreviation for magazine, while cloud is a synonym for online.

== Product ==
MagCloud allows users to self-publish and distribute content, for business or personal use, as a professional-quality print publication or digitally for mobile and online viewing. Magazines are printed in full color via the HP Indigo Division on high quality paper in a variety of sizes and formats at a cost of US$0.16 or $0.20 per page, plus shipping and handling.

Authors set the cost for the publication and can markup to receive profits from MagCloud monthly. MagCloud offers users a variety of publishing and distributions services including automated ordering, print management, worldwide shipping, direct mail services, digital distribution and an online storefront, all free of charge.

In addition to discovery on the market for new, small publications, the service is used by existing magazines and publications such as STACK Models Magazine with a more traditional distribution method to make back issues available for sale.
