= Inc. India =

- Editor: Anuradha Das Mathur
- Categories: Business
- Frequency: Monthly
- Publisher: 9.9 Media
- First issue: February 2009
- Company: 9.9 Media
- Country: India
- Language: English

Inc. India is a monthly business magazine published by 9.9 Media. The magazine in an Indian version of the popular US magazine Inc. that focuses on entrepreneurship and growth. The magazine claims to serve as a resource base for rapidly growing, Indian small- and mid-size enterprises. The electronic version of Inc. India was launched in February 2009 and the print version was expected to launch in October of the same year.
