= Play (Chinese magazine) =

Chinese magazine

- Editor: Liu Wei
- Categories: Video games
- Frequency: Monthly
- Circulation: 185,000
- Publisher: Popular Science Press
- First issue: June 1994
- Final issue Number: Dec. 2013; 231
- Country: China
- Based in: Beijing
- Language: Standard Chinese
- Website: http://www.joyplay.cn
- ISSN: 1009-6183

Play (simplified Chinese: 家用电脑与游戏; pinyin: Jiāyòng Diànnǎo Yǔ Yóuxì; lit. 'Home Computer and Game') was a Chinese game-and-software oriented magazine founded in October 1993 and first officially published in June 1994 by Popular Science Press (科学普及出版社). The magazine was originally named Home Computer and Game Console (家用电脑与游戏机), and focused on both PC games and console games. In January 2001 it was renamed to its current name and its coverage shifted to focus on PC games exclusively, making it the first specialized PC gaming magazine in China. Subsequently Play became one of the most important gaming magazines in mainland China.

In October 2013, a tweet from Play's official microblog, announced that the November–December issue (Issue #231) would be released as a combined issue with a farewell-like statement. According to Gamersky.com, the stoppage in publishing came due to both human and environmental factor: Reader preference for quantity rather than quality of information; Too much advertisement content; The increased role of internet-based video game journalism; and a general lack of a distinctive character. Following only one year after the closure of the prominent journal Diànzǐ Yóuxì Ruǎnjiàn, the shutdown of Play after nearly 20 years of continual publication has been regarded in context with the earlier shutdown of big-name Western magazines like Electronic Gaming Monthly, GamePro, and Nintendo Power as an example of the global nature of the decline in printed publications.

== Historical timeline ==
- October 1993 – State Science and Technology Commission approves the founding of Home Computer and Game Console (家用电脑与游戏机) as a Popular Science Press publication.
- June 1994 – The magazine's premier issue is released and publications continue bi-monthly.
- January 1995 – Release schedules are increased to make the magazine a monthly publication, and growing circulation figures place the publication among the top 10 most widely read Chinese periodicals.
- January 2001 – The magazine is renamed to Home Computer Game (家用电脑与游戏) and shifts emphasis solely to the PC game market. At this point it also adopts its English moniker, Play.
- January 2002 – The magazine becomes a full-color publication.
- 2003 – The magazine is honored by GAPP who award it the Jin Ling Awards for Best Game-Related Media and Chinese Game Industry's Most Influential annual game-related media. The magazine is subsequently granted exhibition space at the ChinaJoy conference.
- October 2013 – The magazine announced its final issue for November–December 2013.
