= Digit Channel Connect =

- Categories: IT magazines
- Frequency: Monthly
- Publisher: 9.9 Media
- Company: 9.9 Media
- Country: India
- Language: English
- Website: www.digitchannelconnect.com

Digit Channel Connect is a monthly publication targeting the IT distribution and reseller channel, aimed at IT resellers, retailers, distributors and system integrators. 9.9 Media publishes the magazine.
