= Computer Gaming World =

American computer game magazine

- Issue 249 from March 2005
- Editor: Russell Sipe (1981–1992); Johnny Wilson (1992–1999); George Jones (1999–2001); Jeff Green (2001–2006)
- Categories: Computing, Gaming
- Frequency: Monthly
- Founder: Russell Sipe
- First issue: November 1981; 45 years ago
- Final issue Number: November 2006; 20 years ago 268
- Company: Golden Empire Publications (1981–1993); Ziff Davis (1993–2006)
- Country: United States
- Based in: Cambridge, Massachusetts
- Language: English
- Website: computergamingworld.com (Archived 2004-06-05 at the Wayback Machine)
- ISSN: 0744-6667
- OCLC: 8482876

Computer Gaming World (CGW) was an American computer game magazine that was published between 1981 and 2006. One of the few magazines of the era to survive the video game crash of 1983, it was sold to Ziff Davis in 1993. It expanded greatly through the 1990s and became one of the largest dedicated video game magazines, reaching around 500 pages by 1997.

In the early 2000s its circulation was about 300,000, only slightly behind the market leader PC Gamer. But, like most magazines of the era, the rapid move of its advertising revenue to internet properties led to a decline in revenue. In 2006, Ziff announced it would be refocused as Games for Windows, before moving it to solely online format, and then shutting down completely later the same year.

== History ==
In 1979, Russell Sipe left the Southern Baptist Convention ministry. A fan of computer games, he realized in the spring of 1981 that no magazine was dedicated to computer games. Although Sipe had no publishing experience, he formed Golden Empire Publications in June and found investors. He chose the name Computer Gaming World (CGW) instead of alternatives such as Computer Games or Kilobaud Warrior because he hoped that the magazine would both review games and serve as a trade publication for the industry. The first issue appeared in November, about the same as rivals Electronic Games and Softline (Sipe's religious background led to "Psalm 9:1–2" appearing in each issue. His successor as editor, Johnny L. Wilson, was an evangelical Christian minister).

The first issue, November/December 1981

The first issues of Computer Gaming World were published from Anaheim, California, and sold for $2.75 individually or $11 for a year's subscription of six issues. These early bimonthly issues were typically 40–50 pages in length, written in a newsletter style, including submissions by game designers such as Joel Billings (SSI), Dan Bunten (Ozark Software), and Chris Crawford. Also, early covers were not always directly related to the magazine's contents, but rather featured work by artist Tim Finkas. In January/February 1986 CGW increased its publication cycle to nine times a year.

CGW survived the video game crash of 1983, which badly hurt the market; by summer 1985 it was the only survivor of 18 color magazines covering computer games in 1983. In autumn 1987 CGW introduced a quarterly newsletter called Computer Game Forum (CGF), which was published during the off-months of CGW. The newsletter never became popular; only two issues were published before it was cancelled. Some of CGF's content became part of CGW, which became a monthly.

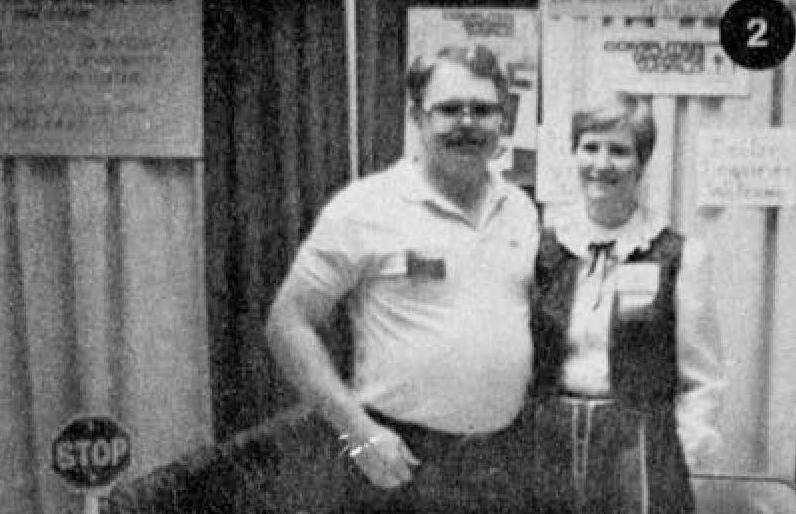
Russell Sipe and Suzanne Sipe in 1982 at the West Coast Computer Faire

The magazine went through significant expansion starting in 1991, with page counts reaching 196 pages by its 100th issue, in November 1992. During that same year, Johnny Wilson (who started as a contributor in 1983), became editor-in-chief, although Sipe remained as publisher. In 1993, Sipe sold the magazine to Ziff Davis—by then the magazine was so thick that a reader reported that the December issue's bulk slowed a thief who had stolen a shopping bag containing it—but continued on as publisher until 1995. The magazine kept growing through the 1990s, with the December 1997 issue weighing in at 500 pages. In January 1999, Wilson left the magazine and George Jones became editor-in-chief, at a time when print magazines were struggling with the growing popularity of the Internet. Jones had been the editor-in-chief of CNET Gamecenter, and had before that been a staffer at CGW between 1994 and 1996. He was replaced by Jeff Green in the summer of 2001.

On August 2, 2006, Ziff Davis and Microsoft jointly announced that CGW would be replaced with Games for Windows: The Official Magazine. The new magazine replaced CGW as part of Microsoft's Games for Windows initiative. In their press release, Ziff Davis indicated that much of CGW's core content and the entire staff will be transferred to the new magazine. Because of these announcements, Ziff Davis' actions appeared more on the order of a rebranding of CGW, rather than an actual cancellation. The final CGW-labeled issue was November 2006, for a total of 268 published editions.

On April 8, 2008, 1UP Network announced the print edition of Games for Windows: The Official Magazine had ceased, and that all content would be moved online.

Simultaneously with the release of the final CGW issue, Ziff Davis announced the availability of the CGW Archive, which features complete copies of the first 100 issues of CGW, as well as the two CGF issues, for a total of 7438 pages covering 11 years of gaming. The archive was created by Stephane Racle, of the Computer Gaming World Museum, and is available in PDF format. Every issue was processed through optical character recognition, which enabled the creation of a 3+ million word master index. Although Ziff Davis has taken its CGW Archive site offline, the magazines can be downloaded from the Computer Gaming World Museum.

== Circulation ==
According to MDS, CGW had a circulation slightly above 300,000 as of 2006.

== Awards and acclaim ==
Bruce F. Webster reviewed the first issue of Computer Gaming World in The Space Gamer No. 48. Webster commented that "I strongly recommend this magazine to computer gamers, and just one reason alone will (in my opinion) suffice: You can now start getting from just one publication the information that you've been having to dig out of three or four or five (or six...). Get it."

Page 6 reviewed Computer Gaming World and stated: "Quite apart from being an interesting read, you will get more out of your existing games and will have a much better idea of what to buy as your next piece of software. No other computer magazine that I can think of will give you reviews of such depth."

In 1988, CGW won the Origins Award for Best Professional Adventure Gaming Magazine of 1987.

The New York Times repeatedly praised CGW, placing it as one of the premier computer game publications of its time. In 1997 the newspaper called it "the leading computer game magazine", In 1999 "the bible of computer game purists", and in 2005 "one of the top computer game magazines".

== PC Gaming World ==
Ziff Davis also published a sister magazine to Computer Gaming World, entitled PC Gaming World, in the United Kingdom. It was the region's third-largest computer game magazine by August 2000. In 1998, journalist Stuart Campbell described PC Gaming World as a publication with a predominantly American bent, thanks to its "sober, serious, text-heavy style". He considered it to be out of step with the British game audience. Campbell later called the magazine an "oddity" that was "clearly aimed primarily at a 40-something audience and beyond", in comparison to more youthful rivals such as PC Gamer UK and PC Zone.

In July 2000, Ziff Davis sold its publishing arm in Europe to Verenigde Nederlandse Uitgeverijen (VNU), including three magazines in Germany, three in France and four in the United Kingdom. PC Gaming World migrated with these publications. At the time, The Register reported that VNU saw PC Gaming World as a poor match for its business model, which left the magazine's future uncertain. The publisher sold PC Gaming World to Computec Media a month after the purchase, citing its lack of synergy with VNU's existing brand. This transition was set to be completed in October 2000.

According to Golem.de, Computec planned to fold PC Gaming World together with its own PC Gameplay magazine, which it launched in 2000. PC Gaming World had closed by the first half of 2001; Computec moved the publication's subscribers to PC Gameplay, which nevertheless struggled to grow its base. The company "relaunched" PC Gameplay as PC Gaming World in 2003, but did not release the new publication's subscriber count through the Audit Bureau of Circulations during the first half of that year. Writing for GamesIndustry.biz, Kristan Reed noted that this decision was "never a healthy sign". Computec sold its entire British game magazine branch to competitor Future Publishing in late 2003.
