= Gamer'z =

Korean video game magazine

- Cover of Gamer'z for September 2026 (#318) issue, featuring the characters from Trails in the Sky 2nd Chapter
- Editor: Seong Yong
- Categories: Video game journalism
- Frequency: Monthly
- First issue: May 31, 2002; 24 years ago
- Company: Game Munhwa
- Country: South Korea
- Based in: Seoul
- Language: Korean
- Website: www.gamerzmall.co.kr
- ISSN: 1228-9647

Monthly Gamer'z (Korean: 월간 게이머즈) is a video game magazine based in Seoul, South Korea. It is published by Game Munhwa.

Gamer'z is the only active printed video game magazine in South Korea.

== History ==
Gamer'z originated from Monthly PlayStation, a short-lived monthly magazine focusing on the PlayStation consoles that ran from May to July 2000. Monthy Gamer'z was established by the same editors behind Monthly PlayStation. It was launched in May 2002. It was established by the publisher Game Munhwa. The editor-in-chief is Seong Yong.

Monthly Gamer'z had strong sales throughout the mid-2000s, selling up to 40,000 copies monthly. By 2020, Gamer'z became the only printed video game magazine active in South Korea.
