= Dianzi Youxi Ruanjian =

Chinese video game magazine

- Cover of issue #300
- Editor: Pei Xiao (Last editor-in-chief)
- Former editors: Chun Xiao (Co-founding editor-in-chief); Wenyu Liu (Co-founding editor-in-chief)
- Categories: Video games
- Frequency: Bi-weekly
- Circulation: 300,000
- Publisher: China Association for Science and Technology
- Founded: 1993
- First issue: May 1994
- Final issue Number: February 2012; 319
- Country: China
- Based in: Beijing
- Language: Mandarin Chinese
- Website: www.vgame.cn(defunct)
- ISSN: 1006-5032

Dianzi Youxi Ruanjian (simplified Chinese: 电子游戏软件; lit. 'Electronic Game Software'; also known by the portmanteau abbreviation Dian Ruan (电软; lit. "Electro Soft")) is China's earliest video game magazine. Founded in the summer of 1993 and officially serialized in May 1994 by China Association for Science and Technology, the magazine was originally subtitled Game Jizhongying (GAME集中营; lit. "Game Concentration Camp"), and focused on both PC games and console games. In July 1995 it was closed by the government, however the publication ban was lifted two months later and the magazine was given the more politically palatable subtitle Game Fengjingxian (GAME风景线; lit. "Game Landscape"). Topical coverage broadened after this point to include articles on anime, comics, music, and popular culture in general, however the de-emphasis on video games created a rift among staff and several editors led by Bing Suo (索冰; better known under the pseudonym "King") left the magazine to found Dianzi Youxi yu Diannao Youxi (电子游戏与电脑游戏; lit. "Electronic Games and Computer Games"; known by the portmanteau abbreviation Dian Dian (电电; lit. "Electro Comp")), a rival magazine catering to a hardcore and doujin gamer ethic.

From 1995 to 2000, Dian Ruan and Dian Dian dominated video game magazine sales in the country and the competition between them was stiff and occasionally acrimonious. The early 2000s saw the introduction of prominent rivals, and the development of specialist gaming magazines like the PC-focused Play. From 2003 (the year that marked the folding of Dian Dian) through 2005, Dian Ruan experienced the peak of its influence with annual income approaching 16.5 million yuan. The 2010s would see the magazine's last days as the rise of internet journalism prompted a global decline of newspapers. On June 13, 2010, a large number of staff simultaneously resigned and the magazine was described by Gameaning journalists as "hanging by a thread". At the end of February 2012, a Weibo post from Dian Ruan's official microblog confirmed that their next issue (#319) would be the last.

Seven months later, in September 2012, the magazine re-opened with a different format and with an academic rather than entertainment focus on video games. This new iteration of the magazine was short-lived and two months later (in November 2012) the magazine was renamed Dianzi Jishu yu Ruanjian Gongcheng (电子技术与软件工程; lit. "Electronic Technology and Software Engineering"), and its emphasis was shifted to non-game electronic hardware.

== Historical timeline ==
- Summer 1993 - Dianzi Youxi Ruanjian "Game Jizhongying" is founded by Chun Xiao (晓春), Wenyu Liu (刘文雨; using the pseudonym "Xunfeng" (熏风)), Song Tian (田松), Long Qiuzhao (邱兆龙; pseudonym "Long Ge" (龙哥)), and Rude Liu (刘儒德; pseudonym "Lao d" (老d)). Xiao takes the position of general manager and the others act as journalists and editors. The magazine begins life as a series of "books" recognized with unique ISBN identifiers (e.g. the first two issues in 1993 use ISBN 7-4303-1472-0 /T.294 (issue #1) and ISBN 7-80036-X /G.23 (issue #2)).
- 25 May 1994 - The magazine gains approval for an official nationally recognized serialization number (CN-11-3505/TP) and restarts its numbering at #1.
- 14 December 1994 - The magazine gains international recognition with an ISSN number (ISSN 1006-5032).
- July 1995 - Authorities halt the publication of "Game Jizhongying" citing 15 publication infractions including the use of a repugnant publishing title, the use of anonymous pseudonyms for all staff, and the misuse of their "Dian ruan sheping" (电软社评; lit. "Electro Soft Editorial") column. This column contained politically sensitive issues like criticism of the government policies on games and frank discussion of the then-rampant software piracy.
- September 1995 - Under the efforts of founding member, Wenyu Liu, the publication ban is lifted.
- October 1995 - Publication resumes under the title "Game Fengjingxian" and the editor in chief, now Wenyu Liu, discards his old pseudonym to publish under his real name.
- Late 1995 - The first Dian Ruan supplemental publications are published. The first, "Dian Ruan 94 Diancang Ben" (电软94典藏本; lit. "Electric Soft Collection '94") had been created by editor Bing Suo (索冰; better known under the pseudonym "King") during the suspension period. This is followed by the "Miji Baodian" (秘技宝典; lit. "Cheats Collection") supplement.
- Spring 1996 - Artistic differences between staff members come to a head with the original founders tending to favor expansive coverage of related popular topics like anime, comics, music, etc. using strict controls (e.g. limiting articles to 2 pages, etc.), and newer staffers led by Bing Suo (AKA "King") adopting a philosophy more in tune with the hardcore doujin gamer ethic. King leaves with 3 others to found Dianzi Youxi yu Diannao Youxi (电子游戏与电脑游戏; lit. "Electronic Games and Computer Games"). Hard feelings between the two papers lead them to publish scathing critiques of each other.
- 1997–1999 - Competition with Dian Dian persists. Dian Ruan releases spin-off series including the popular "Gedou Tianshu" (格斗天书; lit. "Fighting Bible") series and the "Youxi Piping" (游戏批评; lit. "Game Criticism") supplemental series to boost revenues.
- 2003–2005 - Dian Dian folds and Dian Ruan experiences the peak of its influence with annual income of approaching 16.48 million yuan.
- 13 June 2010 - Large number of staff resign simultaneously. Dian Ruan described as "hanging by a thread".
- 27 February 2012 - Dian Ruan folds. Issue #319 is its final publication.
- 10 September 2012 - Dian Ruan reopens with an academic focus on video games.
- November 2012 - The magazine is renamed Dianzi Jishu yu Ruanjian Gongcheng (电子技术与软件工程; lit. "Electronic Technology and Software Engineering") and covers non-game electronic hardware.
