= Games for Windows: The Official Magazine =

Former computer game magazine

- Editor: Jeff Green
- Categories: Computing, gaming
- Frequency: Monthly
- First issue: December 2006
- Final issue Number: April 2008; 17
- Company: Ziff Davis
- Country: United States, Canada
- Language: English
- Website: GFW on the 1UP Network
- ISSN: 1933-6160

Games for Windows: The Official Magazine was a monthly computer game magazine published by Ziff Davis Media, licensing the Games for Windows brand from Microsoft Corporation. It was the successor to Computer Gaming World. The first issue was released in November 2006. As of the April/May 2008 issue, the magazine is no longer offered in print and the editorial staff was integrated with 1UP.

According to Ziff Davis, the magazine was to be a "rebirth" of the Computer Gaming World magazine, which had lost news stand presence over the past few years. Furthermore, according to the editorial staff of CGW/GFW, the magazine would essentially remain unchanged and was in no way subject to Microsoft's influence, something reflected in the language of the legal agreement between Ziff Davis and Microsoft (akin to how the content of Official U.S. PlayStation Magazine (OPM) was not influenced by Sony in any way, outside of demo disc content).

For the last several years, Computer Gaming World coverage had overwhelmingly been on Windows-only games due to the relative lack of games which support other operating systems. According to the editors of the magazine from an August 2006 podcast, the idea of a Windows Games-exclusive magazine began when Microsoft sought to establish Windows as a viable gaming platform (particularly at E3 2006), akin to its console brother, the Xbox. The editors of CGW approached Microsoft with the idea of a platform-focused magazine not unlike OPM or Nintendo Power, who then started a bidding war among different publishers for the rights to do so. Eventually, Ziff-Davis won the rights and because the company already had a computer gaming-based magazine, sought to re-launch the current publication in its current form.

The final editorial staff included Editor-in-Chief Jeff Green, senior editor Sean Molloy, news editor Shawn Elliott, and reviews editor Ryan Scott. Editor Darren Gladstone left the magazine in December 2007 to work for PC World.

The cover of the premiere issue of GFW was considered an homage to the cover of the first issue of CGW, with the prominence of a dragon on both covers.

Located at 1UP.com, the editors of the magazine continued to host the weekly GFW Radio podcast, hosted by the editorial staff. After the departure of several key staff members, including Jeff Green and Shawn Elliott, the last episode was broadcast on September 17, 2008.
