= 1Up Network =

American entertainment network

1Up.com
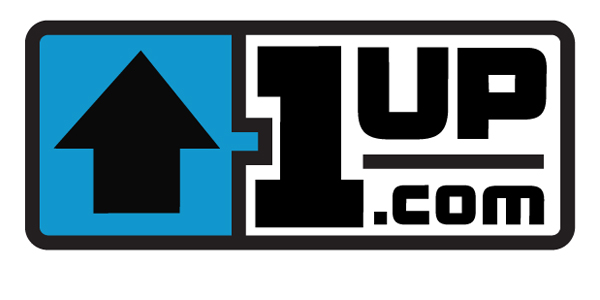

- Screenshot Front page on December 31, 2008
- Website type: Video game website
- Dissolved: July 2013
- Owner: IGN Entertainment
- Website: 1up.com
- Commercial: Yes
- Registration: Optional
- Launched: 2003; 23 years ago
- Current status: Content deleted, domain redirects to IGN

1Up.com was an American entertainment website that focused on video games. Launched in 2003, 1Up.com provided its own original features, news stories, game reviews, and video interviews, and also featured comprehensive PC-focused content. Like a print magazine, 1Up.com also hosted special week-long online cover stories that presented each day a new in-depth feature story, interview with the developers, game screenshot gallery, game video footage, and video of the game studio and creators. On February 21, 2013, Ziff Davis announced it would be winding down the site, along with sister sites GameSpy and UGO.com.

== Network ==
1Up Network was a collection of podcasts hosted by 1Up.com dealing with various aspects of gaming. Most of the shows, like 4 Guys 1Up, were about games and general gaming culture. Others were more specific, such as The Sports Game Guy's Sports Anomaly, which focused on sports games. The network also featured Retronauts, an audio retrospective series that chronicled various retro games and game series. The network had shown significant growth, with several new shows having been introduced in 2007–2008. However, in early 2009 1Up.com was purchased by UGO and its parent company Hearst Corporation from Ziff Davis. This resulted not only in the closure of Electronic Gaming Monthly, but also the loss of over 30 jobs, including several hosts and producers of the site's many podcasts. Because of this, more than half of the network's shows were abruptly discontinued, leaving only a few remaining. While 1Up Yours did not cease to exist, the resignation of the show's co-host Shane Bettenhausen led host Garnett Lee to change the show's name and structure to Listen UP. Several former employees also started their own projects after the firings as well, including Co-Op, the spiritual successor to The 1Up Show, Rebel FM, the follow-up to 1Up FM, and The Geekbox, Ryan Scott's replacement for Lan Party podcast.

== Programming ==
List of 1Up Network podcasts
Start date	End date	Title	Host or starring	Notes	Ref.
November 12, 2010		Games, Dammit!	David Ellis, Jeremy Parish, Thierry Nguyen, and Jose Otero	Formerly 4 Guys 1 Up	
August 20, 2005		1UP Yours	Garnett Lee, Shane Bettenhausen, Luke Smith and John Davison		
January 30, 2009		Listen Up	Jane Pinckard, Ryan O'Donnell, and Che Chou		
October 23, 2009		4 Guys 1 Up			
July 2, 2010		In This Thread			
October 4, 2006		Retronauts	Jeremy Parish and Bob Mackey		
October 21, 2005	December 19, 2008	The 1UP Show			
April 21, 2006	January 6, 2009	Broken Pixels	Seanbaby, Shane Bettenhausen, and Crispin Boyer		
		RadiOPM	Joe Rybicki along and Dana Jongewaard		
April 26, 2006	June 10, 2008	EGM Live*	Jennifer Tsao		
February 16, 2006	September 17, 2008	GFW Radio	Jeff Green, Shawn Elliott, Ryan Scott, Sean Molloy, Darren Gladstone, Robert Ashley, and Anthony Gallegos		
October 7, 2008	December 23, 2008	LAN Party	Ryan Scott, Robert Ashley, Anthony Gallegos, Tina Sanchez, and Matt Chandronait		
June 16, 2008		1UP FM	Philip Kollar and Nick Suttner		
January 10, 2008		Legendary Thread	Demian Linn, Rob Bowen		
April 8, 2008		Review Crew	Garnett Lee		
February 24, 2009		at1UP	Mike Cruz, Jade Kraus, and Travis Williams		
November 12, 2009		The Oddcast	Tina Sanchez, Scott Sharkey, Sam Kennedy, Chris Plante		
February 26, 2009		Good Grief			
October 15, 2009		Active Time Babble	Jeremy Parish		
		The Sports Game Guy's Sports Anomaly	Todd Zuniga, Greg Ford, David Ellis, Andrew Fitch, and Tyler Barber		

=== 1UP Yours ===
The initial four-man lineup included Garnett Lee, Shane Bettenhausen, Luke Smith and John Davison. However, Smith later left the network to accept a position at the then-Microsoft game development studio Bungie. On August 24, 2007, Mark MacDonald was declared the show's official fourth chair member. John Davison then announced that he was leaving the 1UP staff, though he would continue his participation with the podcast despite his change in career. The last officially branded 1UP Yours was recorded on January 17, 2009, and was released on January 22, 2009. On September 30, 2009, Garnett Lee announced he would be leaving 1UP to become the editorial director for Gamefly Media. It was replaced by 4 Guys 1UP hosted by former fourth chair David Ellis. Lee stated he will create a new show for Gamefly Media titled Weekend Confirmed.

On January 6, 2009, it was announced that Ziff Davis would be selling 1UP.com to the Hearst Corporation, in the process terminating Electronic Gaming Monthly and over 30 employees, including Shane Bettenhausen and Andrew Pfister. In the wake of the announcement the future of 1UP Yours was uncertain. On January 16, Garnett Lee confirmed the continuation of the series with a new cast consisting of John Davison, David Ellis, and Garnett Lee and new regular addition Sam Kennedy. However, the show would have to continue under a new name, Listen UP. However, with Lee's departure from 1UP in October 2009, the show would end, its final episode airing October 9, 2009.

=== Retronauts ===
Retronauts also produced the supplement video podcast, Bonus Stage, which looked at specific retro titles more closely. After a long hiatus, Bonus Stage was finally updated in September 2009. Retronauts returned to producing video content with Retronauts Lunch Break, though this segment was not available as a podcast. Bob Mackey has also crossed over with the Laser Time podcast network. After 1UP was shuttered by Ziff Davis, Retronauts survived as its own entity. The podcast raised money through crowdfunding, and was later promoted through the USGamer website, a subsidiary of Eurogamer. Retronauts is now fully crowdfunded on Patreon.

Digital Trends has hailed Retronauts as one of the best video game podcasts, for covering historic games with a strong selection of guest commentators. Retronauts was also included on Kotaku's list of best gaming podcasts, who praised its cast and depth of coverage on each topic. Polygon also recommended Retronauts and its host, with Chris Plante saying "when it comes to retro video games, I trust no one more than Jeremy Parish."

=== The 1UP Show ===
The 1UP Show was a weekly videogame podcast produced by the website. The show premiered on October 21, 2005, and featured editors from 1UP.com, Electronic Gaming Monthly, and Games for Windows: The Official Magazine. The show was initially created by Jane Pinckard and Ryan O'Donnell, and Che Chou. The show was co-produced by Cesar Quintero, Rob Bowen, Jason Bertrand, Jay Freshette, and Mikey Nguyen. The theme song was created by Jane Pinckard (who previously played in the band Dealership) and Eric Haller, with the music for the series being composed by Ryan O'Donnell. The show consisted of previews and reviews of video games as well as debates and discussions on videogame news. The podcast contained some scripted content, but mostly consisted of unscripted discussions. The 1UP Network was sold by Ziff Davis to the UGO Network on January 7, 2009, and two days later Matt Chandronait announced on 1UP.com that The1UP Show would be ending due to the acquisition.

==== Awards ====
Award	Date	Category	Recipient	Result	Ref.
Best of the Web Awards	2007	Best Podcast or Vodcast	The 1UP Show	Finalist	
Best of the Web Awards	April 18, 2008	Best Podcast or Vodcast	The 1UP Show	Finalist	

=== Broken Pixels ===
The first episode of Season 1 debuted on September 9, 2008, with the crew playing Robocop for the original Xbox. Former 1UP and GFW editor Shawn Elliott made a guest appearance on the WWE Crush Hour episode during this season. At the end of the Season 1 finale, a teaser was shown announcing that the second season would be premiering January 6, 2009. However, that was the day of the Ziff Davis layoffs that left more than 30 people out of a job, including the entire cast of Broken Pixels. Furthermore, Seanbaby noted that he caused controversy with "media watchdogs" by his use of the term "faggotiest" in the Spiderman 3 episode at the end of season one. Most fans assumed that the show would not continue and that the segments they filmed would never be released, but season 2 premiered on February 6, 2009, with the Sega CD game, Wirehead.

=== GFW Radio and LAN Party ===
It was announced on September 4, 2008, that Jeff Green would leave Ziff Davis after 17 years to join Electronic Arts to work on the "Sim" franchise. Shortly afterward on September 17, co-host Shawn Elliott also announced that he would be leaving the company to work under Ken Levine as associate producer on the next 2K Boston video game. The podcast is often affectionately referred to its nickname "97.5 The Brodeo".
