= CFO India =

Indian finance magazine

- Categories: Finance magazines
- Frequency: Monthly
- Publisher: 9.9 Media
- First issue: November 2009
- Company: 9.9 Media
- Country: India
- Language: English
- Website: CFO India

CFO India is a magazine for India's CFO community published monthly by 9.9 Media.

== History and profile ==
CFO India was launched in November 2009, on the second anniversary of the parent firm, 9.9 Media. The magazine is published on a monthly basis. Anuradha Das Mathur was the founding editor of the magazine.
