= SKOAR! =

SKOAR! is an Indian magazine, website, and community dedicated to video games. It is a part of 9.9 Mediaworx and was started in 2003 as a bi-monthly publication by Jasubhai Digital Media (JDM) Pvt. Ltd.

== History and profile ==
SKOAR! was launched in 2003 as a sister publication to Digit in order to cater to more hardcore gamers. The tagline of SKOAR! was "... when it's done".

SKOAR!'s tagline was changed to "India's only gaming magazine" as of 2010 (which may or may not be true as a statement in itself). Publishing of SKOAR! as a magazine was stopped in 2011, and it was made into a gaming section inside its sister publication Digit and an occasional supplement in some of Digit's special issues. In 2014 SKOAR! was relaunched as a digital e-magazine that was given away with every issue of Digit in the form of a SKOAR! DVD. The e-magazine was an interactive PDF that was provided on the DVD, which also contains other gaming software such as full games, game demos, videos that are of interest to gamers, wallpapers, and more.

SKOAR! was re-instated as a print supplement with Digit in November 2014, and continues to this day (as of their April 2015 issue). The SKOAR! website was relaunched on 4 April 2015, and apart from PC and console gaming, also covers mobile gaming extensively.

== Sections ==
SKOAR!' features "sections dealing with PC as well as console games. The games are rated on the basis of visual appeal, sound, gameplay and mojo factor and employ a horizontal bar with a maximum rating of 10.

== Expo ==
SKOAR! has been arranging gaming expos in metropolitans of India. On 30 January 2008 it has conducted 4 expos. The first expo was held in Mumbai, the second one in Bangalore and a third one was held in January 2007 in Delhi.

The fourth expo was conducted in Mumbai at MMRDA grounds, Bandra Kurla Complex for spend three days (25 to 27 January 2008).
