= Video game journalism =

Journalism genre that reports on video games

A 1989 issue of the Computer Entertainer magazine

Video game journalism (or video game criticism) is a branch of journalism concerned with the reporting and discussion of video games, typically based on a core "reveal–preview–review" cycle. With the prevalence and rise of independent media online, online publications and blogs have grown.

== History ==
=== Print-based ===
As early as 1972 Spacewar! competition received a feature article in Rolling Stone written by its then sports reporter Stewart Brand. The first magazine to cover the arcade game industry was the subscription-only trade periodical, Play Meter magazine, which began publication in 1974 and covered the entire coin-operated entertainment industry (including the video game industry). Consumer-oriented video game journalism began during the golden age of arcade video games, soon after the success of 1978 hit Space Invaders, leading to hundreds of favourable articles and stories about the emerging video game medium being aired on television and printed in newspapers and magazines. In North America, the first regular consumer-oriented column about video games, "Arcade Alley" in Video magazine, began in 1979 and was penned by Bill Kunkel along with Arnie Katz and Joyce Worley. The late 1970s also marked the first coverage of video games in Japan, with columns appearing in personal computer and manga magazines. The earliest journals exclusively covering video games emerged in late 1981, but early column-based coverage continued to flourish in North America and Japan with prominent examples like video game designer Yuji Horii's early 1980s column in Weekly Shōnen Jump and Rawson Stovall's nationally syndicated column, "The Vid Kid" running weekly ran from 1982 to 1992.

The first consumer-oriented print magazine dedicated solely to video gaming was Computer and Video Games, which premiered in the U.K. in November 1981. This was two weeks ahead of the U.S. launch of the next oldest video gaming publication, Electronic Games magazine, founded by "Arcade Alley" writers Bill Kunkel and Arnie Katz. As of 2015, the oldest video game publications still in circulation are Famitsu, founded in 1986, and The Games Machine (Italy), founded in 1988.

The video game crash of 1983 badly hurt the market for video game magazines in North America. Computer Gaming World (CGW) reported in a 1987 article that there were eighteen color magazines covering computer games before the crash but by 1984 CGW was the only surviving magazine in the region. Expanding on this in a discussion about the launch of the NES in North America, Nintendo of America's PR runner Gail Tilden noted that "I don't know that we got any coverage at that time that we didn't pay for". Video game journalism in Japan experienced less disruption as the first magazines entirely dedicated to video games began appearing in 1982, beginning with ASCII's LOGiN, followed by several SoftBank publications and Kadokawa Shoten's Comptiq. The first magazine dedicated to console games, or a specific video game console, was Tokuma Shoten's Family Computer Magazine (also known as Famimaga), which began in 1985 and was focused on Nintendo's 8-bit Family Computer. This magazine later spawned famous imitators such as Famitsū (originally named Famicom Tsūshin) in 1986 and Nintendo Power in 1988. Famimaga had a circulation of 600,000 copies per issue by December 1985, increasing to 1 million in 1986.

By 1992, British video game magazines had a circulation of 1 million copies per month in the United Kingdom. During the early 1990s, the practice of video game journalism began to spread east from Europe and west of Japan alongside the emergence of video game markets in countries like China and Russia. Russia's first consumer-oriented gaming magazine, Velikij Drakon, was launched in 1993, and China's first consumer-oriented gaming magazines, Diànzǐ Yóuxì Ruǎnjiàn and Play, launched in mid-1994.

==== Features ====
Often, game reviews would be accompanied by awards, such as the C+VG Hit, the YS Megagame or the Zzap!64 Gold Medal, awarded usually to titles with a score above 90%. Other features would be gameplay hints/tips/cheats, a letters page, and competitions.

=== Web-based ===
There are conflicting claims regarding which of the first two electronic video game magazines was the "first to be published regularly" online. Originally started as a print fanzine in April 1992, Game Zero magazine claims to have launched a web page in November 1994, with the earliest formal announcement of the page occurring in April 1995. Game Zero's web site was based upon a printed bi-monthly magazine based in Central Ohio with a circulation of 1500 that developed into a CD-ROM based magazine with a circulation of 150,000 at its peak. The website was updated weekly during its active period from 1994 to 1996.

Another publication, Intelligent Gamer Online ("IG Online"), debuted a complete web site in April 1995, commencing regular updates to the site on a daily basis despite its "bi-weekly" name. Intelligent Gamer had been publishing online for years prior to the popularization of the web, originally having been based upon a downloadable "Intelligent Gamer" publication developed by Joe Barlow and Jeremy Horwitz in 1993. This evolved further under Horwitz and Usenet-based publisher Anthony Shubert into "Intelligent Gamer Online" interactive online mini-sites for America Online (AOL) and the Los Angeles Times' TimesLink/Prodigy online services in late 1994 and early 1995. At the time, it was called "the first national videogame magazine found only online".

Game Zero Magazine ceased active publication at the end of 1996 and is maintained as an archive site. Efforts by Horwitz and Shubert, backed by a strong library of built up web content, eventually allowed IG Online to be acquired by Sendai Publishing and Ziff Davis Media, the publishers of then-leading United States print publication Electronic Gaming Monthly who transformed the publication into a separate print property in February 1996.

==== New media ====
Future Publishing exemplifies the old media's decline in the games sector. In 2003 the group saw multi-million GBP profits and strong growth, but by early 2006 were issuing profit warnings and closing unprofitable magazines (none related to gaming). Then, in late November 2006, the publisher reported both a pre-tax loss of £49 million ($96 million USD) and the sale—in order to reduce its level of bank debt—of Italian subsidiary Future Media Italy.

In mid-2006 Eurogamer's business development manager Pat Garratt wrote a criticism of those in print games journalism who had not adapted to the web, drawing on his own prior experience in print to offer an explanation of both the challenges facing companies like Future Publishing and why he believed they had not overcome them.

With the rise in popularity of esports, traditional sports reporting websites such ESPN and Yahoo launched dedicated esports sections in early 2016. This move came with controversy, especially in the case of ESPN, whose president had stated that esports were a competition instead of a sport. The response to the shift was either great interest or great distaste. Yahoo eSports ended on June 21, 2017.

In addition to ESPN and Yahoo, other dedicated esports news sites, like The Score Esports or Dot Esports, cover some of the most widely followed games like Counter-Strike, League of Legends, and Dota 2.

==== Independent ====
While self-made print fanzines about games have been around since the first home consoles, the rise of the internet gave independent gaming journalist a new platform.

At first ignored by most major game publishers, it was not until the communities developed an influential and dedicated readership, and increasingly produced professional (or near-professional) writing that the sites gained the attention of these larger companies.

Independent video game websites are generally non-profit, with any revenue going back towards hosting costs and, occasionally, paying its writers. As their name suggests, they are not affiliated with any companies or studios, though bias is inherent in the unregulated model to which they subscribe. While most independent sites take the form of blogs, the 'user-submitted' model, where readers write stories that are moderated by an editorial team, is also popular.

In recent times some of the larger independent sites have begun to be bought up by larger media companies, most often Ziff Davis Media, who now own a string of independent sites.

In 2013–2014, IGN and GameSpot announced significant layoffs.

==== The rise of reviews on video-oriented sites ====
According to a 2014 article by Mike Rose in Gamasutra: "The publicity someone like TotalBiscuit ... can bring you compared to mainstay consumer websites like IGN, GameSpot and Game Informer is becoming increasingly significant. A year ago, I would have advised any developer to get in touch with as many press outlets as possible, as soon as possible. I still advise this now, but with the following caveat: You're doing so to get the attention of YouTubers." Rose interviewed several game developers and publishers and concluded that the importance of popular YouTube coverage was most pronounced for indie games, dwarfing that of the dedicated gaming publications.

David Auerbach wrote in Slate that the influence of the video games press is waning. "Game companies and developers are now reaching out directly to quasi-amateur enthusiasts as a better way to build their brands, both because the gamers are more influential than the gaming journalists, and because these enthusiasts have far better relationships with their audiences than gaming journalists do. ... Nintendo has already been shutting out the video game press for years." He concluded that gaming journalists' audience, gamers, is leaving them for video-oriented review sites.

== Ethics ==
Journalism in the computer and video game media industry has been a subject of debate since at least 2002.

=== Conflicts of interest and pressure from game publishers ===
Publications reviewing a game often receive advertising revenue and entertainment from the game's publishers, which can lead to perceived conflicts of interest. Reviews by 'official' platform-specific magazines such as Nintendo Power typically have direct financial ties to their respective platform holders.

In 2001, The 3DO Company's president sent an email to GamePro threatening to reduce their advertising spend following a negative review.

In 2007, Jeff Gerstmann was fired from GameSpot after posting a review on Kane & Lynch: Dead Men that was deemed too negative by its publisher, which also advertised heavily on the website. Due to non-disclosure agreements, Gerstmann was not able to talk about the topic publicly until 2012.

In a 2012 article for Eurogamer, Robert Florence criticised the relationship between the video games press and publishers, characterising it as "almost indistinguishable from PR", and questioned the integrity of a games journalist, Lauren Wainwright. In the controversy that followed, dubbed "Doritogate" (after a video of Geoff Keighley emerged of him sitting in front of bottles of Mountain Dew, bags of Doritos and an ad banner for Halo 4, that Florence also referenced in the article), the threat of legal action—the result of broad libel laws in the UK—caused Eurogamer to self-censor. Eurogamer's editor-in-chief Tom Bramwell censored the article, and Florence consequently retired from video games journalism.

According to a July 2014 survey by Mike Rose in Gamasutra, approximately a quarter of high-profile YouTube gaming channels receive pay from the game publishers or developers for their coverage, especially those in the form of Let's Play videos.

Following the Gamergate controversy that started in August 2014, both Destructoid and The Escapist tightened their disclosure and conflict of interest policies. Kotaku editor-in-chief Stephen Totilo said writers were no longer allowed to donate to Patreon campaigns of developers. Kotaku later disclosed that journalist Patricia Hernandez, who had written for them, was friends with developers Anna Anthropy and Christine Love, as well as being Anthropy's former housemate. Polygon announced that they would disclose previous and future Patreon contributions.

=== Review scores and aggregate ratings ===
Reviews performed by major video game print sources, websites, and mainstream newspapers that sometimes carry video game such as The New York Times and The Washington Post are generally collected for consumers at sites like Metacritic and Game Rankings. If the reviews are scored or graded, these sites will convert that to a numerical score and use a calculation to come out with an aggregate score. In the case of Metacritic, these scores are further weighted by an importance factor associated with the publication. Metacritic also is known to evaluate unscored reviews and assign a numeric score for this as well based on the impression the site editors get about the review.

Within the industry, Metacritic has become a measure of the critical success of a game by game publishers, frequently used in its financial reports to impress investors. The video game industry typically does not pay on residuals but instead on critical performance. Prior to release, a publisher may include contractual bonuses to a developer if they achieve a minimum Metacritic score. In one of the more recognized examples, members of Obsidian Entertainment were to have gotten bonuses from Bethesda Softworks for their work on Fallout: New Vegas if they obtained a Metacritic score of 85 or better out of 100. After release, the game only obtained an 84 aggregate score from Metacritic, one point away, and Bethesda refused to pay them.

Video game reviewers are aware of their impact on the Metacritic score and subsequent effect on bonus payment schemes. Eurogamer, prior to 2014, were aware that they generally graded games on a scoring scale lower than other websites, and would pull down the overall Metacritic score. For this reason, the site dropped review scores in 2014, and their scores are no longer included in these aggregate scores. Kotaku also dropped review scores for the same reason. Eurogamer later reverted to scoring reviews.

Frequently, publishers will enforce an embargo on reviews of a game until a certain date, commonly on the day of release or a few days ahead of that date. Such embargoes are intended to prevent tarnishing the game's reputation prior to release and affecting pre-release and first-day sales. Similar embargoes are used in other entertainment industries, but the nature of interactivity with video games creates unique challenges in how these embargoes are executed. In agreements with publishers, media outlets will get advance copies of the game to prepare their review to have ready for this date. However, embargo agreement may include other terms such as specific content that may not be discussed in the review. This has led to some publications purposely holding off reviews until after the embargo as to be able to include specific criticism towards features that were marked off-limits in the embargo agreement, such as for 2013's SimCity. Additionally, modern lengthier games can offer more than 20 hours of content, and the amount of time journalists have to review these advance copies prior to the embargo date is limited. It has become a concern of these journalists that they are knowingly publishing reviews that cover only a fraction of the game's content, but waiting any longer beyond the embargo date will harm viewership of their site.

=== Rumors, confidential information, and blacklisting ===
A good deal of information in the video game industry is kept under wraps by developers and publishers until the game's release; even information regarding the selection of voice actors is kept under high confidential agreements. However, rumors and leaks of such information still fall into the hands of video game journalists, often from anonymous sources from within game development companies, and it becomes a matter of journalistic integrity whether to publish this information or not.

Kotaku has self-reported on the downsides of reporting unrevealed information and dealing with subsequent video game publisher backlash as a result. In 2007, the site published information about the then-upcoming PlayStation Home before Sony had announced it, and Sony severed its relationship with Kotaku. When Kotaku founder Brian Crecente reported this on the site, readers complained to Sony about this, and Sony reversed its decision. Kotaku has also published significant detailed histories on troubled game development for titles such as for Doom 4 and Prey 2, as well as announcing titles months in advance from the publisher. In November 2015, the site reported they had been "blacklisted" by Bethesda and Ubisoft for at least a year; they no longer got review copies, nor received press information from the publishers, nor can interact with any of their company's representatives.

== New Games Journalism ==
New Games Journalism (NGJ) is a video game journalism term, coined by journalist Kieron Gillen in 2004, in which personal anecdotes, references to other media, and creative analyses are used to explore game design, play, and culture. It is a model of New Journalism applied to video game journalism. A 2010 article in the New Yorker claimed that the term New Games Journalism "never caught on, but the impulse—that video games deserved both observational and personal approaches—is quite valid." It cites author Tom Bissell and his book Extra Lives: Why Video Games Matter as a good example of this type of gaming journalism.

== Retro game reviews ==
As retro gaming grew in popularity, so did reviews and examinations of older video games. This is primarily due to feelings of nostalgia to video games people have grown up with, which, according to professor Clay Routledge, may be more powerful than similar nostalgic emotions caused by other artforms, such as music.

== See also ==
- List of books about video games
- List of video game magazines
