= List of cancelled Sega Genesis games =

The Genesis, known as the Mega Drive outside of the United States, is a video game console released by Sega. This list documents games that were confirmed to be announced or in development for the Genesis at some point, but did not end up being released for it in any capacity.

== Games ==
There are currently 246 games on this list. (Note: This number is always up to date by this script.)

List of cancelled Sega Genesis games
Title(s)	Notes/Reasons	Developer	Publisher
Air Drums	A game announced for the Genesis to be used in conjunction with the short-lived Sega Activator motion control-based controller. The game simulated playing a drum kit, and was said to have 2 separate modes: "free play" and "Simon Says". The game never released; no official reason was given, but the controller it was developed for was generally poorly received.	Sega	Sega
Amegedon	A proposed video game adaption of Lee Hyun-se's Armageddon manhwa, announced as part of a larger effort to make it a multi-media franchise, the project never developed outside of some artwork released around the time of its announcement, though a video game unrelated to the Genesis project did later release on PC in 1996.	Softmax	
Akira	An adaptation of the 1988 anime film Akira was planned for release on Sega Genesis, Super NES and Sega CD in 1995, with Game Boy and Game Gear games based on the film also being considered. Gameplay and content varied wildly among versions, but disagreements in the direction of the games with THQ occurred and the game fell onto the backburner, never releasing for any system. The Genesis version later leaked onto the internet in 2019.	Black Pearl Software	THQ
Al Unser Jr. Racing	Present at CES 1994, the game was described as a racing video game hosted by its namesake Al Unser Jr. An emphasis on speed, and "different track and car options" was reported on. It was only listed as in development for the Genesis, but never released in any capacity. A prototype of the game was later discovered by the Video Game History Foundation in 2025, as part of a group of prototypes that had been evaluated for distribution via Sega Channel.		The Software Toolworks
Alien vs Predator	A Genesis version of the 1993 SNES release was in development for the Genesis and PC platforms, but was cancelled by Activision, its publisher, when it wasn't happy with how development was progressing.	Realtime Associates	Activision
Aliens	Mean Machines magazine reported that a Genesis version of the 1990 arcade game release was scheduled for release in mid-1991, but the game never materialized on the Genesis.		
Andromeda Mission	A version of the 1988 Amiga game was included in a 1990 catalogue of upcoming games from publisher Color Dreams for the Genesis, but it game never materialized. The game involved controlling a spacecraft and using it to shoot waves of oncoming enemies from an over-the-back perspective.	Demonware	Color Dreams
Aspect Warriors	A partnership between Games Workshop and Electronic Arts, it was isometric role-playing video game that would have been a mix between the former's board games and the latter's Desert Strike video game. It was scheduled for an early 1994 release date, and received extensive previews from multiple publications, but never released or materialized in any capacity.	Electronic Arts	Electronic Arts
Astropede / Segapede	A game proposed for the Genesis after Sega Technical Institute had finished development of Sonic the Hedgehog 2 (1992) and Sonic Spinball (1993), the game was a platformer that was to take place in the Sonic the Hedgehog universe. A tech demo was pitched to Sega using unused Sonic 2 assets, and was greenlit for production, but the game never released, as the development team had limited resources and had to focus on finishing other titles, eventually dropping the title. The game went unannounced and unknown to the public until gameplay footage surfaced online in 2020.	Sega Technical Institute	Sega
B-Bomb	A game that followed three characters that had been captured by "Plutonians", and their only hope for freedom is by competing in a game. The game, and its gameplay, involved moving a character in a low-gravity environment, and positioning them above the characters in order to do a butt slam attack to knock them away. The game never released in any capacity. No reason was given, but publications often cited confusion in its premise in previews.	Sega Technical Institute	Sega
Baby Boom	One of a few games proposed by Sega to publish games that would appeal more to females, the game entailed controlling a hand that would move babies out of harm's way. The game was announced for the Sega Genesis, Sega CD and Game Gear, but never released in any capacity. According to developer Ed Annunziata, the game was cancelled because the moving of the hand cursor was not fun with a d-pad controller.	Sega	Sega
Baby's Day Out	A video game adaptation of the 1994 film Baby's Day Out was announced for Genesis, SNES, and Game Boy, and advertised on the film's VHS release. The game involved the player using a cursor to keep the film's baby out of trouble. Despite being far enough along for publications to receive review copies in late 1994, no versions of the game were ever released. The few reviews that were published were generally not positive, citing slow and boring gameplay.	Designer Software	Hi Tech Expressions
Barbie: Vacation Adventure	A Barbie-themed minigame compilation was in development for Genesis and SNES, and was far enough along in development for review copies to be sent out to magazines in late 1994, though neither version saw release. The game is set to be released for the first time in 2026 as part of the Barbie Rewind game compilation.	Software Creations	Hi Tech Expressions
Battle Mission	Described as a shooting gallery game in vein of Operation Wolf, it was reported to be cancelled around mid-1990, and was never released in any capacity.	Nihon Telenet	Renovation Products
Battle Storm	A military strategy game announced for use with the Teleplay Modem accessory that would allow for players to play cross-platform online multiplayer across the Genesis and the NES. When official licensing for the accessory could not be obtained by Sega and Nintendo, both the accessory and the game were cancelled.	Baton Technologies	
Bean Ball Benny	A game involving driving around in a taxi and throwing beanballs at enemy characters. The game was present at CES 1990 and reportedly far along, but cancelled after the closure of its publisher NuVision Entertainment.	Microsmiths	Nuvision Entertainment
Brutal Sports Football	Ports of the Amiga game Brutal Sports Football (1993) were announced for the Genesis, SNES, and Atari Jaguar. The Jaguar version was released in 1994, but the Genesis and SNES versions were delayed and never saw release. The Genesis version was far enough along to be reviewed in GamePro magazine, which, at the time, still used its original Beastball name.	Millennium Interactive, Teque London	Spectrum HoloByte, MicroProse
Beat Force	Joypad magazine reported on a multidirectional shooter named Beat Force being developed for the Genesis by Sammy Corporation, but no further details ever arose and the game never materialized.	Sammy Corporation	Sammy
Beethoven: The Ultimate Canine Caper	A video game adaption of the Beethoven's 2nd film, was announced for the Genesis and Game Gear, but only ever released for Game Boy, SNES, and MS-DOS.	Hi Tech Expressions	Hi Tech Expressions
Benefactor	A Genesis version of the 1994 Amiga game was scheduled for July 1994, and later December 1994, but never released.	Digital Illusions CE	Psygnosis
Beyond Zero Tolerance / Zero Tolerance 2	A sequel to the 1994 Sega Genesis title Zero Tolerance was announced for the Genesis and 32X, and scheduled for release in 1995, but was cancelled and never released for either platform. The game was later released onto the internet as freeware in the 2000s, and as part of the Zero Tolerance Collection on the Nintendo Switch in 2022.	Technopop	Accolade
Biker Mice from Mars	In 1994, Konami announced video game adaptions of the animated television series Biker Mice From Mars. Genesis and SNES were announced as target platforms; the SNES game released in 1994, while a Genesis game never materialized.	Konami	Konami
Bill's Tomato Game	A Genesis version of the 1992 Amiga game was announced for a 1994 Genesis release, but never materialized.	Tempest Software	Psygnosis
Black Crypt	A Genesis version of the 1992 Amiga game was scheduled for July 1992, but never materialized.	Raven Software	Electronic Arts
Blackthorne	Shortly after the game's initial release on SNES, publisher Interplay had intended to develop a Genesis version, but decided against it in favor of concentrating on more powerful hardware. Sega 32X, Sega Saturn, and PlayStation 1 versions were announced, though of those, only the 32X version released.	Blizzard Entertainment	Interplay Entertainment
Bobby's World	A video game adaption of the Bobby's World cartoon show was announced for Genesis and the SNES. Both versions never saw a release.	Riedel Software Productions	Hi Tech Expressions
Boo!	A platformer in the vein of Sonic the Hedgehog or Super Mario, starring a ghost boy who goes around scaring enemies by yelling out "boo!" Announced for the Genesis, SNES, and Amiga, and was far enough along to be the cover story of Amiga One magazine, along with a tentative October 1994 release. Financial problems with the game's publisher led to its cancellation.	The Conversion Company	MicroProse
Bounty Hunter	A game announced for the Genesis to be used in conjunction with the short-lived Sega Activator motion control-based controller. The game followed Garrot the bounty hunter, with the player using punching, kicking, and martial arts-based movement on the Activator to make the character do the same. The game never released; no official reason was given, but the controller it was developed for was generally poorly received.	Sega	Sega
Breach	A Genesis version of the 1987 Amiga release was announced, and would have featured improvements feature in its sequel, Breach 2, added to it. The Genesis version never officially released, though it eventually leaked onto the internet much later in 2020.	Treco	Sammy
Brett Hull Hockey	A Genesis version of the January 1994 SNES release was announced for the Genesis and Atari Jaguar. The Genesis version was reportedly complete and scheduled for release in April 1994 according to Computer and Video Games magazine, though neither alternate version ever materialized.	Radical Entertainment	Accolade
Cadaver	A Genesis version of the 1990 game was reported to be in development by The One magazine in February 1991, but never materialized.	The Bitmap Brothers	Image Works
Captain Dynamo	Versions of the 1992 PC release were announced for the Genesis and Game Gear, but neither ever released.	Codemasters	Codemasters
Carl's Crazy Carnival	Developer Origin Systems featured a system where their developers could pitch game ideas to potentially have the company work on when they were looking to start new projects. Carl's Crazy Carnival was outlined in a 2014 feature by Eurogamer documenting some of the standout abandoned ideas. Pitched by artist Bill Narum, Carl's Crazy Carnival would have followed Carl, who hoped to save his carnival after being hijacked by evil clowns. It would have involved fighting large volumes of silly characters being armed with just a customizable water gun. The design documents did not specify a genre, and Narum had died in 2009, so it was unable to be determined. Warren Spector helped pitch it to management, but it was still rejected.	Origin Systems	Origin Systems
Casper	A variety of video game adaptions of the 1995 film were released across many video game platforms; the Genesis and Sega 32X were announced as target platforms, but games of the franchise never released on either platform.	Riedel Software Productions	Hi Tech Expressions
The Chaos Engine 2	The game was in development for the Sega Genesis, and was far enough along to have a playable beta prototype created, but the developers did not have a publishing deal for the game on the Genesis, so it only released on Amiga platforms when it was released in 1996. A ROM image was leaked online.	The Bitmap Brothers	
Chessmaster 2100	A Genesis version of the 1988 PC release was announced at CES 1992, but never released.		The Software Toolworks
Citadel / System Shock	Developer Origin Systems featured a system where their developers could pitch game ideas to potentially have the company work on when they were looking to start new projects. Many were never announced until being outlined in a 2014 feature by Eurogamer documenting some of the standout abandoned ideas. One was a pitch for a Genesis version of 3D first-person action game called Citadel they were developing for PC platforms. The Genesis version was not pursued, while the PC version evolved into the 1994 release System Shock.	Origin Systems	Origin Systems
City Heroes	A South Korean developed title for the Genesis that closely resembled the game Streets of Rage 2. The game was reportedly finished, with multiple publications writing hands-on previews for it, and scheduled for release outside of South Korea as well. However, South Korea's newly implemented censorship laws conflicted with the game, and prevented its release in any capacity.	Samsung	Samsung
Claymates	A version of the 1993 SNES release was planned for the Genesis, but never materialized.	Visual Concepts	Interplay Productions
Colorado	A version of the 1990 Amiga game was included in a 1990 catalogue of upcoming games from publisher Color Dreams for the Genesis, but the game never materialized. The game was an adventure game involving surviving out in the wilderness.	Silmarils	Color Dreams
Congo	A video game adaption of the 1995 film Congo was concurrently in development for Sega Genesis and Super NES, unrelated to the Sega Saturn game Congo The Movie: The Lost City of Zinj (1996). The game was to feature multiple gameplay styles, including platforming, white water rafting, and some shooting segments, to represent various sequences from the film. The game underwent a difficult and rushed five month development period, and though it was completed by its intended completion date, publisher Viacom's concerns over quality and a game bug led to its cancellation.	Visual Concepts	Viacom New Media
Converse Hardcore Hoops / Converse City Ball Tour	Announced at E3 1995 for the Genesis, Sega Saturn, Sega 32X, SNES, PlayStation 1, and PC, the game was reportedly far in development, but was cancelled and never released in any capacity. Despite a large budget and a then-impressive 15,000 frames of animations, the game reported garnered very negative reactions from test audiences, who did not like the game's half-court, two versus two set up.		Virgin Interactive
Cosmic Carnage / Cyber Brawl	According to former Sega staff member Takayuki Kawagoe, Cosmic Carnage / Cyber Brawl was initially developed for the Mega Drive, but was converted to the 32X on short notice so that it could have a larger game library.	Almanic Corporation	Sega
Cutiepoo / Cutie Poo	A 2D side-scrolling game where the player controlled Bob, who was meant to find and protect little creatures called tribbles from the evil Dr. Mallet, who wished to kill them with a mallet. The game was in development for the Genesis, Amiga, Atari ST, and the PC Engine, but was never released in any capacity. DMA Design co-founder Mike Dailly, the game was cancelled by another co-founder, David Jones, who was unhappy with how the game was progressing.	DMA Design	
Dan Marino Football / Dan Marino's Touchdown Football	An American football game featuring sponsorship from player Dan Marino was listed as a video game to be published by Virgin games for the Genesis at CES 1993, though it never materialized in any capacity. A prototype of the game was later discovered by the Video Game History Foundation in 2025, as part of a group of prototypes that had been evaluated for distribution via Sega Channel.	Park Place Productions	Virgin Interactive Entertainment
Dando / Vasum	A quest-based adventure game announced for the Genesis in 1990, the game never materialized in any capacity. It also went by the name Vasum in Japan.	Aicom	Treco
Danny Sullivan's Indy Heat	Released as an arcade game in 1991, a number of other versions were created shortly afterwards for the NES, Amiga, Atari ST, and Commodore 64. A Genesis version was announced, and despite being virtually finished, never officially released during the Genesis's lifespan. A very limited run of copies were created in 2011, which lead to the game leaking onto the internet shortly afterwards.	Leland Corporation, Software Creations	Tradewest
Datastorm	In 1993, Bethesda's parent company Media Technology established a Danish division called Media Technology Scandinavia to expand its operations in Europe. Former Bethesda programmer Jørgen Bech recounted that he had worked on a version of Datastorm for the Sega Genesis. Development took longer than expected to get the game running on Genesis hardware, and while it was eventually completed, its release was cancelled because Bethesda didn't think it was commercially viable to release games for the Genesis or SNES in 1994, where they believed only rare breakout hits like Earthworm Jim (1994) could find success.	Bethesda Softworks	Bethesda Softworks
Death & Destruction	Developer Origin Systems featured a system where their developers could pitch game ideas to potentially have the company work on when they were looking to start new projects. Death and Destruction was outlined in a 2014 feature by Eurogamer documenting some of the standout abandoned ideas. It was described as a "mad scientist simulation. The player would be given two possible routes through the game, one where the player thoughtfully solves puzzles, with gameplay similar to The Incredible Machine, and one where the player can just choose to "go on a killing spree" with gameplay closer to Robotron. The game was pitched with design documents, but rejected on the grounds that it was estimated to cost too much money at the time.	Origin Systems	Origin Systems
Devi and Pii	One of the first games designed by Takashi Iizuka, the game was developed in 1992, but was cancelled before ever being announced. Iizuka kept a near finished build of the game, and after learning of its existence, Sega producer Yosuke Okunari suggested it be included in the game lineup for the Sega Genesis Mini 2 dedicated console, which was released in 2022.	Sega	Sega
Devil Buster	An action game announced by SIMS for the Sega Genesis, despite a Japanese release date set for May 1993, the game never released in any capacity.	SIMS	
Die Hard Trilogy	A video game adaption of the first three Die Hard films, development originally started off for the Sega Genesis and 32X, before shifting to the Sega Saturn, PlayStation 1, and Windows, where it released across late 1996 and early 1997, well after the Genesis's lifespan.	Probe Entertainment	Fox Interactive
Dino Racer / Demon Dinosaurs	A racing game in the vein of Super Mario Kart where humans rode and raced dinosaurs while collecting items like boosts or weapons. It was scheduled for release in early 1995 for the Sega Genesis, but never materialized in any capacity.	Codemasters	Codemasters
Untitled Doctor Who game	Mean Machines Sega reported that Sega was developing a video game adaption of BBC's long-running Doctor Who television series to coincide with an upcoming revisiting of the franchise, though the game never materialized.	Sega	Sega
Dominus	Sega Genesis and SNES versions of the 1994 real-time strategy MS-DOS release were announced, but never materialized.	Visual Concepts	Asciiware
Dr. Franken	Originally announced for the Sega Genesis, SNES, and the original Game Boy original, the Genesis version never materialized, despite the latter two versions releasing in the early 1990s.	Codemasters	Elite Systems
Dragon's Lair	An adaptation of the 1983 arcade game of the same name was announced and present at CES 1994, though it was more similar to the straight platformer version that had previously released on the NES in 1990. It was scheduled for release later in the year, but never materialized.	Eden Entertainment Software	Taito
Dungeon Master II: The Legend of Skullkeep	A version of the 1993 PC game was in development for the Sega Genesis, and far enough along to have a review copy sent to Computer and Video Games magazine, but the Genesis version never released, though a Sega CD version did release the following year.	FTL Games	Interplay Entertainment
Dwagons	A box-pushing puzzle video game in the vein of Sokoban announced for the SNES and Sega Genesis, the game never materialized for either platform.	Imagitec Design	
Dynamite Düx	Home versions of the 1988 arcade video game were announced for many home consoles and PC platforms, and while many released, including a Master System version, the announced Sega Genesis version never released.	Sega	Sega
DynoBlaze/Dinoblades	A beat em up game announced for the Sega Genesis, Sega CD, and SNES, about dinosaurs that wear rollerblades and play street hockey. It was scheduled for a late 1995 release, but never materialized in any capacity.	Bonsai Entertainment	Virgin Interactive Entertainment
Earl Weaver Baseball	An iteration of Electronic Arts' Earl Weaver Baseball series was announced for the Sega Genesis, but cancelled in mid-1992 in favor of other baseball game projects. EA would later release entries in the Tony La Russa Baseball and Triple Play Baseball series instead.	Mirage Graphics	Electronic Arts
Elite	A version of the 1984 PC game was in development for the Sega Genesis and 32X in 1994, but was delayed and eventually cancelled after Sony pulled out of publishing the game. The Genesis version featured polygonal graphics, and the 32X version featured greater detail in its graphics. In 2020, a demo of the Genesis version was released onto the internet by designer Ian Bell.	Hybrid Technology	Sony Imagesoft
Environmental Detective	A platformer announced with a single screenshot at CES 1992. The game followed the "Ozone Kid" as they solved mysteries related to bettering the environment, being developed in efforts to encourage kids to do their best in cleaning up the environment themselves. While originally slated for distribution through Sega Channel during the service's launch in test markets, the game was cancelled in July 1994 due to development issues.	Magicom Software	
Ernie Els Golf	Codemasters announced a golf game for Master System, Genesis, and Game Gear under the name Global Golf, later changed to Ernie Els Golf following a sponsorship deal with professional golfer Ernie Els. Only the Game Gear version was ultimately released.	Codemasters	Codemasters
The Excellent Dizzy Collection	A collection of three entries from the Dizzy series of games — Panic Dizzy (1990), Dizzy the Adventurer (1991), and the previously unreleased Go! Dizzy Go! — was scheduled for release in 1994. Despite being announced for the Sega Genesis, Sega CD, Master System, and Game Gear, only the Game Gear version ever materialized.	Interactive Studios	Codemasters
EXP: The Excellent Potato	A Korean-developed role-playing game in development across 1995 and 1996. For the first half of its development, it was being made for the Sega Genesis, but it was cancelled in favor of a PC release after publisher Samsung dropped its support for developing games for the Genesis late in its lifespan. It eventually released on PC platforms in South Korea.	Open Production	Samsung
Face Plant	A spin-off of the Road Rash series that involved racing and fighting while snowboarding rather than Road Rash's motorcycling. Originally in development for the Sega Genesis under the name Face Plant across 1993 and 1994, it was cancelled in 1995 in favor of shifting development to the newer Sega Saturn, PlayStation 1, and the 3DO Interactive Multiplayer platforms. While development continued into 1996 under the new name Shredfest, it was eventually cancelled for those platforms as well.	Electronic Arts	Electronic Arts
Falcon	A version of the 1987 PC game was announced for the Sega Genesis at CES 1989 as part of an upcoming partnership between Sega and publisher Spectrum Holobyte, and while they would go on to release games for the Genesis, Falcon never materialized.		Spectrum HoloByte
Fido Dido	A game featuring the 7 Up mascot Fido Dido was announced for the Sega Genesis, and far enough along to be reviewed in Sega Power magazine in 1994. The game was a side-scrolling platformer with puzzle elements. It involved a sketch of the mascot jumping off of a piece of paper and exploring various environments of real life. The game was cancelled due to the financial issues of its publisher.	Teeny Weeny Games	Kaneko
Fire and Ice	Released on a variety of PC platforms in the early 1990s, a version for the Sega Genesis and Game Gear was scheduled for release in early 1994, but never materialized.	Graftgold	Virgin Games
Firearm	A run-and-gun game based on the Malibu Comics superhero Firearm was in development, but was cancelled.	Malibu Interactive	Malibu Interactive
Fireteam Rogue	A large budget action-adventure game in development for the Sega Genesis and SNES. It was envisioned as a multi-media project that would have included a comic book series and collectible holograms, but the game experienced a prolonged, difficult development period between 1993 and 1995. It was eventually cancelled when its publisher decided that the game's quality juxtaposed with the end of the platforms lifespans couldn't make it a profitable project, and it never released on either platform.	Accolade	Accolade
The Freedom Star	A conversion of the 1988 arcade game P-47: The Phantom Fighter was in development, but went unreleased. The game's soundtrack was released as part of the SUPER Rom Cassette Disc In JALECO music album by City Connection's Clarice Disk label in 2015. A prototype was showcased at an Akihabara-based event in 2016. The game was later finished by developer Habit Soft and officially released in 2025 under the name P-47 II MD.		Jaleco
Frog Dude	A platformer in the vein of Super Mario that involved a frog character collecting strawberries. A prototype was developed in the early 1990s, but abandoned in favor of pursuing and releasing Alfred Chicken (1993). One of its developer's released a very incomplete but playable prototype onto the internet in 2014.	Twilight	
Future Zone	GamePro reported on its presence at CES 1993, describing it as a "cinematic side scrolling action/adventure" game with large environments in the vein of Super Mario World. The game was announced for the Sega Genesis and SNES and scheduled for release in Q3 1993, but never released for either.		Electro Brain
Ghoul Patrol	Originally developed as an original IP, its gameplay similarities lead to it being developed as a sequel to Zombies Ate My Neighbors (1993). Its publisher established a strict deadline for its completion, leading the developers to cancel the Sega Genesis version in favor of prioritizing its 1994 SNES instead.	LucasArts	JVCKenwood Victor Entertainment
Globdule	A Sega Genesis version of the 1993 Amiga game was announced for release in late 1994, but never materialized.	Ex Animo	Psygnosis
The Godfather III	A video game adaption of The Godfather III (1990) film was announced as the next game in line to be published by U.S. Gold following the early 1990s publishing of Indiana Jones and the Last Crusade: The Action Game for the Sega Genesis. While the Indiana Jones did release, the Godfather III never did.	Delphine Software International	U.S. Gold
Guardian Angels Safety Patrol	A game themed around working for the Guardian Angels volunteer crime prevention group. Announced at CES 1991 and scheduled for a release the following year, the game never materialized.		Nuvision Entertainment
Halloween Capsule	A South Korean developed beat em up game players control animals that had recently been anthropomorphized by a mad scientist, fighting in hope of finding a way of returning to normal. The game was cancelled when developer made the decision to halt all console game development. Publications note that it difficult to tell how far along the game was at the time of cancellation; many character designs were shown off, but only one game environment was ever present.	Softmax	
Hanna Barbera's Turbo Toons	Originally intended for release on the SNES and the Sega Genesis, only the SNES version ever materialized.	Empire Interactive	Empire Interactive
Hardcore / Ultracore	A game in development for the Sega CD and Sega Genesis and scheduled for release in 1994, its release was cancelled when publisher Psygnosis changed it focus to releasing games for the then-upcoming original PlayStation. While never released during the Genesis or Sega CD's actual lifespan, the game was later revisited and finished in the late 2010s, and released under the name Ultracore for the Nintendo Switch, PlayStation 4, and PlayStation Vita platforms across 2019 and 2020.	Digital Illusions	Psygnosis
Hard Yardage	Initially released for PC platforms by Activision, a Genesis version was announced for 1990. Later on, Sega instead bought the rights to quickly rework the game into their own football title in time for released for the holiday season. Quality issues lead to the cancellation of the port and reworking, with Sega instead developing their own title, Joe Montana Football in January 1991.		Activision
Harlem Globetrotters	A basketball game centered around the Harlem Globetrotters was announced for the Genesis in early 1993, with plans for release later in the year, but it never materialized.		GameTek
Highway Encounter	An unannounced version of the 1985 PC game was in development for the Sega Genesis, but was never finished or released. Also planned for Amiga and Atari ST.	Vortex Software	
Home Improvement: Power Tool Pursuit!	A loose video game adaption of the Home Improvement television series was announce for the SNES and the Sega Genesis, though only the SNES version ever materialized, in late 1994.		Absolute Entertainment
Hooves of Thunder	A horse racing video game shown at CES 1992 and CES 1993 for the Sega Genesis that never released in any capacity.	RazorSoft	RazorSoft
Humans 2	A sequel to The Humans (1992), simply titled Humans 2 was announced for the Sega Genesis, and scheduled for a November 1994 release. However, no such title ever materialized, and when a follow up, The Humans: Insult to Injury were released, it was only on PC platforms.	Imagitec Design	GameTek
Hydlide Special	A version of the 1984 PC release Hydlide was announced for the Sega Genesis at CES 1989, but never materialized.		
IF	A South Korean developed top-down perspective action roleplaying game that started development late in the lifespan of the Sega Genesis, leading it to move to being a PC-only game mid-way through development.	HiCom Entertainment	
Impossible Mission 2025: The Special Edition	A remake of Impossible Mission (1984) was released for Amiga platforms a decade later under the title Impossible Mission 2025 (1994). While "special edition" versions for later announced for the SNES and Sega Genesis, and far enough along to be previewed by print magazines, but neither special edition ever released.	MicroProse	MicroProse
Indiana Jones' Greatest Adventures	Originally released for the SNES in 1994, a Sega Genesis version was developed and reported to be 100% and reviewed by magazine publications, but never released. Factor 5 co-founder Julian Eggebrecht stated the Genesis version was cancelled due to publisher U.S. Gold ceasing operations. Reviewed in video game magazines.	Factor 5, LucasArts	U.S. Gold
Interplanetary Lizards of the Texas Plains	A video game adaption of the comic series of the same name was present at CES 1994, with a planned released date of later in 1994, but the game never materialized.	Alexandria Inc.	Tengen
It Came from the Desert	Electronic Arts commissioned New World Computing to create a version of the 1989 Amiga game for the Sega Genesis, and it was reportedly 99.99% complete, but it went unreleased commercially when EA went through a phase where all non-sports related game were cancelled. Years after the fact in the 2000s, Cinemaware, the game's original developer's, hosted the Genesis version for free download on their website.	New World Computing	Electronic Arts
The Itchy & Scratchy Game	A platformer based on the Itchy & Scratchy characters from The Simpsons television series was announced for the Genesis, SNES, and Game Gear. While the other two versions released, the Genesis version did not, even though it was far enough along to be reviewed in magazines.	Bits Corporation	Acclaim Entertainment
Jack Nicklaus Golf '95	Planned sequel to Jack Nicklaus' Power Challenge Golf. The game was present at CES 1995 along with its cover art, but the game never materialized, with a future entry not releasing until the PC-only release Jack Nicklaus 4 (1997).	Accolade	Accolade
Jelly Boy	Originally in development for the SNES, Game Boy, and the Sega Genesis. While the SNES version was simply delayed to 1995 and released, the Genesis version never materialized, despite being far enough along in development to be reviewed by print magazines.	Probe Software	Ocean Software
Jesse "The Body" Ventura Wrestling Superstars	A professional wrestling game announced for the Sega Genesis featuring and sponsored by Jesse "The Body" Ventura. It was present at early 1990s trade shows, and scheduled for release in May 1992, but it never materialized in any capacity	Human Entertainment	DreamWorks
Jester	A game announced to be in development for the Sega Genesis by Sega Technical Institute. The game would have involved a character made out of clay that could be impervious to almost all danger. It was reported to be nearly complete and scheduled for an April 1994 release, but never materialized, with the company going out of business shortly after.	Sega Technical Institute	Sega
Jim Lee's WildC.A.T.S: Covert Action Teams	A video game adaption of WildStorm's Wildcats comic series was announced for the SNES and the Sega Genesis, though only the SNES version ever released, in 1995.	Beam Software	Playmates Interactive Entertainment
Jim Power: The Arcade Game	A reworking of the SNES game Jim Power: The Lost Dimension in 3-D (1993) was in development and scheduled for release on the Sega Genesis in 1994. The game was completed, and send out to magazines for review, but its Genesis release was cancelled. Through the efforts of Piko Interactive and a Kickstarter, and aftermarket release of the Genesis version released in 2021, both on its home platform and a variety of modern ones.	Loriciel	Electro Brain
Jimmy Connors Tennis	A tennis video game featuring professional player Jimmy Connors was announced for the NES and Sega Genesis. The Genesis version was present at CES 1992, but only the NES version released.	NMS Software	Ubi Soft
Journey to the Center of the Earth	A video game adaption of the television series of the same name announced for the Sega CD, Game Gear, SNES, NES and Game Boy. While multiple adaptions released in the 1980s and 2000s, none of the proposed versions of the 1990s, Sega Genesis included, ever released.		Sony Imagesoft
Karate Blazers	A version of the 1991 arcade game was announced for the Sega Genesis, and present at CES 1992, but never released.	Video System	Mc O'River
Kartoon Kombat	A beat em up game with cartoon styled graphics announced for the Sega Genesis. The game was present at E3 1995 but ultimately never released in any capacity.	Technōs Japan	American Technos
Keeper of the Gates	A remake of the game Deliverance: Stormlord II (1990) was announced for the Sega Genesis and PC platforms. The Genesis version, going by the name Keeper of the Gates, while present at CES 1992, never released, while the PC versions released under the name Deliverance (1992).	RazorSoft	Sega
Kung Fu: The Legend Continues	A video game adaption of the Kung Fu: The Legend Continues television series was announced for the Sega Genesis, and was present at CES 1994, but never materialized.	Park Place Productions	Sunsoft
Kye's Quest	A game reported to be in development for the Sega Genesis across 1991 and 1992. Little was known beyond it being a role-playing video game with battery-backed memory for saving game progress, and having some concept art by Joe Hitchens, who released some of the art onto the internet in 2020.	Sega	Sega
Land Buster	A game where the player would control a tank named "Land Buster" to attack evil forces with various collectible weapons in a pseudo-3D environment. The game never materialized in any capacity.		Seismic
Last Survivor	Japanese publication Beep! Mega Drive reported that a Sega Genesis version of the 1989 arcade game would release the following year, but it never materialized.	Sega	Sega
Litil Divil	A version of the CD-i and MS-DOS game was in development for the Sega Genesis, but never released.	Gremlin Interactive	Gremlin Interactive
Lobo	A fighting game based on the Lobo comic book series was announced, and far enough along to have review copies sent to publications, but it never released.	Ocean Software	Ocean Software
The Lord of the Rings	A video game based on The Lord of the Rings book series was in development for the Sega Genesis. The game would have combined elements of fantasy role playing games and visual novels. The game was present at CES 1992 and scheduled for release later in the year, but never materialized.	Electronic Arts	Electronic Arts
Lothar Matthäus Super Soccer	A version of the 1995 SNES release was reported to be in development for the Sega Genesis by German publication Sega Magazin, but the Genesis version never materialized.	Krisalis Software	
Lufia & the Fortress of Doom	A version of the 1993 SNES game was scheduled for the Sega Genesis across 1994 and 1995, and was far enough along to be shown at CES 1995 and have advertisements for its release in magazines, but the Genesis version never materialized.		Taito
Madness: House of Fun	A reworked and renamed version of the 1992 Amiga and Atari ST game Harlequin. The game was far enough along for magazines to evaluate preview copies, but the game never released.	Gremlin Graphics	Gremlin Graphics
The Magical Quest Starring Mickey Mouse	The first entry of the Disney's Magical Quest series was originally released on the SNES in 1992. Shortly after, a Sega Genesis version was announced, and far enough along to be presented at CES 1994, but its release was cancelled in favor of releasing the second entry in the series, The Great Circus Mystery Starring Mickey & Minnie, at the same time of its SNES counterpart, in late 1994.	Capcom	Capcom
Mall Rats	A game involving to exterminating rats in a mall, completely unrelated to the popular film at the time Mallrats (1995). The game's commercial release was cancelled, but gameplay videos leaked onto the internet in 2016.		The Software Toolworks
The Mask	A video game adaption of The Mask (1994) was announced for SNES, Game Gear, and the Sega Genesis. However, development was slow and took longer than expected to complete, leading to the development team cancelling the Sega platforms in order to focus on releasing the SNES version, which released a year after the film's release in late 1995.	Black Pearl Software	THQ
Matrix Runner	One of four games announced for the unreleased Sega VR peripheral. Like all the games, it was cancelled when the Sega VR unit required to play it was cancelled. Little was revealed about the game other than it was to be a cyberpunk game inspired by the game Snatcher (1988).	ZCT Systems Group	Sega
Maverick SFG	A realistic jet fighting game announced for the Sega Genesis and present at CES 1992, though the game never materialized in any capacity.		Sage's Creation
Mega Bomberman: Special 8 Player Demo	Developer Factor 5 created a Bomberman prototype for Hudson Soft to demonstrate their idea for being the series to the Sega Genesis. The tech demo included 8 player multiplayer gameplay through the use of two Team Player multitaps. The pitch was rejected and cancelled in favor of commissioning Westone to bring a version of the PC Engine game Bomberman '94 under the name Mega Bomberman (1994).	Factor 5	Hudson Soft
Metal Lancer	In 2016, Yuji Naka recounted in an interview that prior to creating the first Sonic the Hedgehog (1991), he had been working on a title called Metal Lancer. Outside of a passing mention in Japanese magazine Mega Drive Fan, the game went unannounced until the 2016 interview, where footage was later shown to the interviewer. The game involved girls fighting with robots, and was developed as a showcase to demonstrate the Sega Genesis's technical abilities of screen rotation and zooming in/out. Naka scrapped the game halfway through development, unhappy with its progress, in favor of working on Sonic the Hedgehog.	Sega	Sega
Metal Warriors	Former LucasArts programmer Dean Sharpe stated that versions for both the SNES and Sega Genesis were both in development, but the Genesis version was cancelled when Nintendo obtained publishing rights to the game, and a Genesis version was not revisited after Konami took over for publishing and released the SNES version in 1995.	LucasArts	
Michael Jordan: Chaos in the Windy City	A side-scrolling game featuring playable character Michael Jordan was in development for both the SNES and Sega Genesis. While both version were scheduled for release in November 1994, only the SNES version ever released.	Foley Hi-Tech	Electronic Arts
Mickey Mania 2	While never officially announced, programmer Jon Burton of Traveller's Tales revealed in 2020 that the development team had begun work on a sequel to Mickey Mania for the Sega Genesis. A prototype was created, and is still privately retained by Burton, but the game was cancelled in favor of developing Toy Story (1995).	Traveller's Tales	
Might and Magic III: Isles of Terra	The third entry in the Might and Magic series was in development for a variety of PC platforms, the SNES, Sega CD, and the Genesis. While it was released on most of the announced platforms starting in 1991, the Genesis version, last listed for a November 1994 release, never materialized.	New World Computing	FCI / Electronic Arts
Miina in Wonderland	A mini-game collection in development for the Sega Genesis, it was reported by Beep! MegaDrive magazine to be 90% complete, but never released. A prototype was later leaked and sold on Yahoo! Auctions in the 2010s.	Micronet co., Ltd.	
Mission Impossible	When Ocean Software first announced they had acquired the rights to create a video game adaption of the 1996 Mission Impossible film in 1996, announced platforms included the 32X, SNES, Sega Saturn, and the Sega Genesis. However, a lengthy development period delayed it well beyond most of the platform's lifespans, leading to it only releasing on the Nintendo 64 and PlayStation 1 by the time of its 1998 release.	Ocean Software	Infogrames
Monster Hunter / Monster Hunt	Unrelated to Capcom's Monster Hunter series, the game was a light gun shooter compatible with the Menacer peripheral by Sega for the Genesis. Announced in 1993 for release the following year, it never materialized.	Sega	Sega
Monster Truck Wars / USHRA Monster Truck Wars	A monster truck battling game announced for the SNES and the Sega Genesis, the game was scheduled for a January 1995 release date, but never materialized for either platform.		Acclaim Entertainment
Moon Dancer: Yōseiō no Kikan	A JRPG video game adaption of a manga of the same name was in development for the Sega Genesis. While screenshots and artwork by Naoyuki Kato were released, according to Advanced Daisenryaku designer Hitoaki Minami, who was involved in the game's development, it was cancelled due to internal development issues after six months of work.	Sega	Sega
Motor Mania	A side-scrolling platformer where the player controls a car that must go about a car manufacturing plant and clean up things polluting the area. It was in development for the Genesis in 1994, and was aiming to target a younger demographic, but ultimately never materilaized in any capacity.	Millennium Interactive	Millennium Interactive
Mr. Magoo	A video game adaption of the Mister Magoo animated series was announced for the Sega Genesis in 1994. The game, similar to the cartoon, would have involved the player altering the environment to keep the near sighted Mr. Magoo from walking into dangerous situations, but it never materialized.	Millennium Interactive	Millennium Interactive
Mr. Nutz: Hoppin' Mad / Mr. Nutz 2	After releasing Mr. Nutz: Hoppin' Mad (1994) for the Amiga, plans were announced to release a version of it named Mr. Nutz 2 for the Sega Genesis, positioning it as a sequel to the original Mr. Nutz (1993). Despite the game being far enough along for multiple magazines to publish hands-on previews of their time playtesting the game, the Genesis version never released.	Neon Studios	Ocean Software
Mr. Tuff	Announced for the SNES, Sega CD, and the Sega Genesis, as a platformer with a high difficulty level. The game followed "Mr. Tuff", a robot left behind to demolish the earth and its malfunctioning robots after humans have escaped to a new planet. The Sega CD version was reported to have improved graphics beyond the other two version. Despite being close to completion and scheduled for a late 1994 release, no version of the game ever released.	Sales Curve	
Mutant League Basketball	After the release of Mutant League Football (1993) and Mutant League Hockey (1994), a third entry related to the sport of basketball was teased, though it never materialized. While no reason was given, by the time 1995 was around, publisher Electronic Arts was shifting its focus to the Sega Saturn and PlayStation 1.	Electronic Arts	Electronic Arts
Mutant Speed Demons	A second aborted entry in the Mutant League series beyond Mutant League Football (1993) and Mutant League Hockey (1994), the game would have been motorcycle driving and combat in the vein of Road Rash. The game was announced and mentioned in a few magazines, but quietly dropped off of Electronic Arts release schedule. In 2009, a prototype was leaked, but was damaged beyond usability. In 2013, a 100-200 page game manual detailing ideas surfaced online detailed, but was not shared publicly. In a 2023 interview, a developer revealed that the game was cancelled in an EA mid-1990s software release review, where many titles were cancelled in favor of games they felt more confident in their commercial success, such as Shaq Fu (1994).	New Wave Graphics	Electronic Arts
MTV Sports: Extreme	A video game adaption of the MTV Sports television show in development for the Sega Genesis in 1994. Little was announced outside of the game being a collection of extreme sports for one or two players, including snocross. The game never materialized in any capacity.		Viacom New Media
Ninja Gaiden / Ninja Gaiden IV	An iteration of the Ninja Gaiden series was announced for the Sega Genesis. It was scheduled for a December 1992 release, and was far enough along to be reviewed in magazines, but the game never released in any capacity.	Sega	Sega
The New Breed / DNAction: The New Breed / Cybernauts: The Next Breed	A head to head fighting game in development for the Sega Genesis in 1994, with a release scheduled by the end of the year. The game took place in a world where scientists use genetic engineering to create humans with superpowers; when it goes right, heroes are created, when it goes wrong, villains are created. Characters were modeled in Silicon Graphics workstations to create Donkey Kong Country-styled characters. After the game missed its 1994 release date, no further updates were given and it never released in any capacity.	Accolade	Accolade
Nick Faldo's Championship Golf	A Genesis port was in development, but never materialized. A prototype of the game was later discovered by the Video Game History Foundation in 2025, as part of a group of prototypes that had been evaluated for distribution via Sega Channel.		Grandslam Interactive
Nitro Wrecks / Heavy Machinery	A game that combined the gameplay of Outrun and Road Rash. In development across 1994 and 1995, it began under the name Nitro Wrecks for the Sega Genesis. Development later shifted to the 32X and the game received a name change to Heavy Machinery. The game never released for either platform due to the discontinuation of both platforms.	Zyrinx	Sega
Nolan Ryan Express	A baseball game sponsored by Nolan Ryan was announced for the Sega Genesis, and scheduled to release in February 1993, but never materialized.		Mentrix Software
Nuclear Rush	A 3D shoot em up game in development for the Sege Genesis to be used in conjunction with the unreleased Sega VR virtual reality add-on. The game was developed over the course of a year, completed and submitted to Sega, but because the Sega VR's release was cancelled, and the game required it, the game's release was cancelled as well.	Futurescape Productions	Sega
Omega Fighter	A Sega Genesis version of the 1989 arcade game was announced shortly after its initial release, but never materialized.	UPL Co., Ltd	
Operation: Aliens	A video game adaption of the early 1990s's attempt to create an animated cartoon television series in the Alien film franchise. As the cartoon project was cancelled, so was the accompanying game.		THQ
Oscar	A version of the 1993 PC game release was announced for the SNES and Sega Genesis around the time of its original release. While the SNES version eventually released late in its lifespan in 1996, the Genesis version never materialized.	Flair Software	
Pac-In-Time	Released for the SNES, Game Boy, and PC platforms, Game Gear and Sega Genesis versions were scheduled for late 1995, but never materialized. The Game Gear version leaked onto the internet almost a decade later.	Kalisto Entertainment	Namco
Payne Stewart Pro Golf	A golf game sponsored by professional golfer Payne Stewart was in development in 1995 and scheduled for release in January 1996, but never released.	Time Warner Interactive	Time Warner Interactive
Peaky Blinder	A side-scrolling game involving the player controlling "Peaky", a literal amalgamation and personification of garbage, which aspires to overcome his life in the slums to become a respectable person in a nice house. The game featured a shapeshifting gameplay mechanic for fighting enemies. Announced for SNES, Game Boy, Game Gear, Sega CD, and Genesis, the game was never released for any platforms.		Sales Curve Interactive
Penn & Teller's Smoke and Mirrors	Similar to the video Penn & Teller's Cruel Tricks for Dear Friends (1987), the game was to be centered around mini-games where the player could cheat and deceive their friends. The game was in development for the Genesis and the Sega CD, with the Sega CD version far enough along in its development to have review copies to be distributed to multiple magazines. However, its release was cancelled when publisher Absolute Entertainment abruptly went bankrupt and the developers were unable to find another publisher willing to publish the game for the Sega CD due to its poor market status by 1995. One of the review copies leaked onto the internet in 2005 and the game found a cult following for its off-beat gameplay ideas.	Imagineering	Absolute Entertainment
Pinkie	A version of the 1994 Amiga release was in development for the SNES and Sega Genesis for later that year, but neither materialized during their platform's respective lifespan.	Data Design Interactive	Tengen
Pit-Fighter II	A sequel to Pit-Fighter (1990) was announced for the Sega Genesis, and reportedly 75% complete with a late 1993 release date, though it never materialized in any capacity.	Polygames	Tengen
Plok!	A version of the 1993 SNES release was in development for the Sega Genesis, and according to a 1994 interview with development member Ste Pickford, completed, but the game never released. While no official reason was given, Pickford later noted in 2023 that in attempting to create a version identical to its SNES version, the Genesis version suffered from a low frame rate that the development team struggled to fix.	Software Creations	
Popeye in High Seas High-Jinks	One of three video game adaptions of the Popeye cartoon franchise announced in the mid-1990s. While Popeye Beach Volleyball (1994) and Popeye: The Tale of Seahag the Wicked Witch (1994) both released for the Game Gear and SNES respectively, the Sega Genesis game never materialized in any capacity, despite being previewed at expos and scheduled for release the same year. A prototype of the game was later discovered by the Video Game History Foundation in 2025, as part of a group of prototypes that had been evaluated for distribution via Sega Channel.	Technōs Japan	American Technos
Power Ball AD2001	A futuristic, 2D side-scrolling volleyball game in development for the Sega Genesis across 1994, it was reportedly almost complete, but cancelled after its creators felt it wasn't commercially viable to release with the then-upcoming release of its successor, the Sega Saturn.	HiCom Entertainment	
Power Drift	A port of the arcade game Power Drift (1988) was reported to be in development subsequently for the Sega Genesis, Sega CD, and Sega 32X, but none ever materialized. Ports later arrived on the Sega Saturn and Sega Dreamcast instead.	Sega AM2	Sega
Power Piggs of the Dark Age	Originally announced for the SNES and Sega Genesis, while the Genesis version was far enough along to be reviewed in Sega Power magazine, only the SNES version ever released, late in its lifespan across 1996 and 1997.	Radical Entertainment	Titus Software
Prime	A beat-'em-up game based on the Malibu Comics superhero Prime was in development, but was cancelled.	Malibu Interactive	Malibu Interactive
Prince of Persia 2: The Shadow and the Flame	The 1993 sequel to the original Prince of Persia was released for a variety of PC platforms, and eventually the SNES. While a Sega Genesis version was also in development, and was far enough along to be reviewed in magazines, it was never released.	Microïds	Psygnosis
Princess Fighter	A one versus one fighting game announced for the Sega Genesis, the game was cancelled due to issues between with an unnamed Japanese co-developer and the disbanding of Samsung's in-house game development division after the cancellation of their other titles, City Heroes.	Samsung	Samsung
Putty Squad	A version of the 1994 SNES release was in development for the Sega Genesis, but never commercially released. A playable version of the game later leaked onto the internet in 2015.	System 3	Ocean Software
Ragnarok	A version of the Amiga and MS-DOS release King's Table: The Legend of Ragnarok was announced under the shortened title Ragnarok were announced for the Sega Genesis and Game Gear, but neither ever materialized.	Imagitec Design	
Railroad Tycoon	A version of the 1990 PC release was announced in 1992 for the Sega Genesis and SNES, and present at CES 1993, but neither console version ever released.	MPS Labs	MicroProse
Rally Bike (Dash Yarō)	Released as an arcade game in 1989, a version for the Sega Genesis was in development in the early 1990s by M.N.M. Software while working on a Genesis port of Slap Fight. When a core development member was so overworked that they needed to cut back on work for health reasons, Slap Fight was focused on and released in 1993, while Rally Bike was cancelled.	M.N.M Software	Taito Corporation
Rap Jam: Volume One	A basketball game featuring rappers as playable characters, the game was announced for SNES, Sega Genesis, and the 32X, though only the SNES version ever materialized upon its release in 1995. The 32X version was planned to have an exclusive bonus character, Eazy-E.	64WD Creation	Motown Games
Ratchet and Bolt	Began development as early as 1991 for the Sega Genesis, but its ambition lead to it being pushed to the 32X and its stronger processing power. The game involved controlling 2 police officers, "Ratchet" and "Bolt", who would mix and match different weapon types to defeat oncoming enemies. Featured 2D characters in a 3D environment. Despite years of development, no screenshots or footage was ever shown, just unused box art. The game was one of the Sega-developed games seen as the 32X's "second-wave of software" that was cancelled upon the quick termination of the platform in early 1996. It is unrelated to Sony's similarly named Ratchet and Clank series.	Sega	Sega
Red Belt	A one on one fighting game presented at CES 1989 at the 1989 SCES by Activision. Little else was revealed on the game, which never materialized in any capacity.	Activision	
ResQ	An action game following a character fighting enemies on foot and through a flying airship. The game was scheduled for a November 1994 release exclusively on the Sega Genesis, but never materaliazed.	Tempest Software	Psygnosis
Road Busters	A vertical side scrolling shooter where the player controls a semi truck. It was slated for a November 1990 release, but never materialized.	Telenet Japan	Renovation Products
Road Riot 4WD	A version of the 1991 arcade game was in development for the Sega Genesis, present at CES 1993, and reported by Electronic Gaming Monthly to be 80% complete, but never materialized.	Tengen	Tengen
Road Runner	A video game adaption of the Wile E. Coyote and the Road Runner cartoon series. The game experienced development issues over the game design and concept. Franchise owners Warner Bros. deemed that, in line with the cartoon series, that Wile E. Coyote chases Road Runner, but never succeeds in catching him. This presented a conceptual problem; if the player played as Wile E Coyote, they wouldn't be forced to create gameplay where the player could never win, and if the player played as the Road Runner, they'd need to create gameplay where the player could never lose. Ultimately, the long development time, coupled with the publisher's financial troubles, lead to its cancellation.	Alexandria Inc.	TekMagic
RPG Densetsu Hepoi	A video game adaptation of the 1990 Studio Gallop anime series was set to be published by Sega for the Sega Genesis, but the game never materialized.		Sega
Savage Heroes	A game in development for the Sega Genesis in 1993 that aimed to combine the gameplay of Streets of Rage and Street Fighter 2. A prototype was developed, but the game's scope and ambition was deemed too much for the Sega Genesis hardware, and it wasn't well received internally by employees and managers, leading to its cancellation.	Foley Hi-Tech	Electronic Arts
Search for Ramses II	A game themed around historical figure Ramses II was briefly present for the Sega Genesis at CES 1993, but no such game ever released.		Tengen
Seirei Senshi Spriggan	Former Compile member Yuichi Toyama stated the game was originally intended for release on the Sega Genesis, but due to multiple undisclosed internal reasons, development switched to the PC Engine instead due to multiple circumstances.	Compile	
Sennō Gēmu Teki Paki	A version of the 1991 arcade game was in development for the Sega Genesis, and reportedly 90% complete, but never materialized.	Toaplan	Visco Corporation
Sensible Golf	A version of the 1994 Amiga released was announced for the Sega Genesis, and scheduled for release in November 1994, but never materialized. Why no official reason was given, the Amiga release was poorly received.	Sensible Software	Virgin Interactive Entertainment
The Shadow	A video game adaption of the 1994 filmThe Shadow was announced for the SNES, Atari Jaguar CD, and the Sega Genesis. The game was scheduled for a November 1994 release, and far enough along to be reviewed by many video game publications, but the game never released due to the commercial failure of the film.	Ocean Software	Ocean Software
Shadow of the Beast III	The third entry in the Shadow of the Beast series was originally in development for the Sega Genesis, and scheduled for an April 1994 release, but only ended up releasing on the Amiga platform like prior entries.	Reflections Interactive	Psygnosis
Shadow of Yserbius	A Genesis version of the 1991 MS-DOS game was announced in 1994, but never materialized.		AT&T
Shadows of the Wind	A 2D action game announced for Genesis and Amiga CD32 that never left the prototype phase, it was later discovered by the Video Game History Foundation in 2025, as part of a group of prototypes that had been evaluated for distribution via Sega Channel.		
Shining Wisdom	The entry in the Shining series began development on the Sega Genesis following the completion of Genesis entry Shining Force 2 (1993), but was moved over to its successor the Sega Saturn very late in development, the only platform it released on upon its completion in 1995.	Camelot Software Planning	Sega
Slicks	The working title of a car racing video game played from an isometric perspective. Developers reported that there would be 16 race tracks and the ability to customize cars to alter its attributes, alongside a particular emphasis on good collision detection. The game was in development in 1994, but never released in any capacity.	Codemasters	Codemasters
Smaartvark / Dreyfuss Smaartvark / Arnie the Aardvark	A game where the player controlled an aardvark who was a television repairman, and each level was a different channel on the television. The game was scheduled for a September 1994 release, but never materialized.	Codemasters	Codemasters
Snow White: Happily Ever After	A video game adaption of the 1989 film Happily Ever After was announced for the SNES and Sega Genesis, but only the SNES version ever released.		American Softworks
Soccer Kid	The 1993 Amiga platformer was later released to a wide variety of platforms in the following decade, and while a Sega Genesis version was far enough along to have a review copy sent to Hobby Consolas magazine, it never released.	Krisalis Software	Ocean Software
Socks the Cat Rocks the House / Socks the Cat Rocks the Hill	A platformer starring a cartoon version of Socks Clinton, the cat of Bill Clinton while the President of the United States was announced for the SNES and the Sega Genesis, under slightly different names. The game was far enough along to be reviewed by multiple magazines, but the publisher closed before the game could ship, and its release was cancelled. Builds of the SNES version were obtained by collectors in 2011 and 2012, the latter partnered with publisher Second Dimension, who, after a Kickstarter campaign in 2016, eventually released an after-market version of the game in 2018.		Kaneko
Solo Flight	An updated version of the 1983 Atari 8-bit game was announced for the Sega Genesis, and previewed at CES 1992, but never materialized.	MicroProse	MicroProse
Sonic-16	Sega Technical Institute once proposed a Sonic the Hedgehog game that adapted the world and characters of the 1993 animated series Sonic the Hedgehog to a new video game. A prototype was developed, but reportedly was rejected by Yuji Naka for its lack of speed, and the game was cancelled. Brief video footage of the prototype has leaked onto the internet.	Sega Technical Institute	Sega
Sonic Crackers	Development for a new Sonic the Hedgehog game began around April 1994 for the Sega Genesis as an engine test, with the working title Sonic Crackers. The prototype featured Sonic and Tails joined by an elastic band of energy; the name likely comes from clackers, a toy comprising two balls connected by string. When it became clear that the Genesis was starting to come to the end of its lifespan, and other Sega platforms lacked software, development moved to the Sega 32X platform, where it was reworked into Knuckles' Chaotix (1995) and featured other characters from within the series. A limited, rough playable build of the Sonic Crackers prototype leaked onto the internet in 1996.	Sega	Sega
Sonic X-treme	A proposed Sonic the Hedgehog game by Sega Technical Institute while Sonic Team was busy developing Nights Into Dreams for the Sega Saturn. The game featured a troubled development history, with multiple platform changes, as Sega struggled to figure out which direction to take the franchise after Sonic & Knuckles (1994). The earliest planning began as another side-scrolling platformer on the Sega Genesis, but as ideas moved into making the game a 3D platformer, and the team quickly transitioned to the more powerful 32X hardware, where it was temporarily known as Sonic Mars, and then transitioned again to the Sega Saturn, which was worked on until its ultimate cancellation in late 1996.	Sega Technical Institute	Sega
Untitled isometric Sonic the Hedgehog game	Sega Technical Institute proposed an isometric perspective Sonic the Hedgehog game for the Sega Genesis, similar, but unrelated to, Traveller's Tales later release Sonic 3D Blast (1996). Development never continued beyond the concept art phase, one piece of which leaked onto the internet well after its cancellation.	Sega Technical Institute	Sega
Space Race	Developer Origin Systems featured a system where their developers could pitch game ideas to potentially have the company work on when they were looking to start new projects. Space Race was outlined in a 2014 feature by Eurogamer documenting some of the standout abandoned ideas. Its design documents proposed a game that mixed elements of Road Rash and Super Monaco GP but taking place in outer space. It would have had 3D graphics and have been played in the first person perspective. The pitch was not greenlit, though no details on why were released.	Origin Systems	Origin Systems
Speed Racer in The Challenge of Racer X	A version of the 1992 MS-DOS game was announced for the SNES and Sega Genesis. While the SNES version morphed into a new separate game, Speed Racer in My Most Dangerous Adventures (1994), the Genesis version, despite reportedly 90% complete and scheduled for a September 1994 release, never materialized.	Accolade	Accolade
SpellCaster	A two-player combat-based game focused around casting magic to the timing of music. The game was proposed by Sega Technical Institute as a possible project to work on after the completion of Sonic Spinball (1993), but his pitch was rejected internally and the team moved on to other ideas.	Sega Technical Institute	Sega
Spinny & Spike	An action-based platformer in vein of Alien Soldier where the player would maneuver the two title characters through nightmares. A playable prototype was created and playtested internally; however management requested the game's mechanics and graphics be revamped, and while some design work was done on the revamp, the project was dropped before changes could be programmed.	Sega Technical Institute	Sega
The Sporting News Virtual Soccer	A soccer video game previewed at E3 1995 that would have shared The Sporting News branding, but never released in any capacity.	Probe Entertainment	Hudson Soft
Star Mobile	A version of the 1991 X68000 computer game was developed for the Genesis in 1992, but never officially announced or release during the lifespan of the Genesis. It was not released until 2022, as one of the games included on the Sega Genesis Mini 2 dedicated console.	Mindware	Sega
Starblade	A version of the PC game from the 1980s was included in a 1990 catalogue of upcoming games from publisher Color Dreams for the Genesis, but it never materialized. It was unrelated to the 1991 arcade game Starblade.	Silmarils	Color Dreams
Steven Seagal is the Final Option	A beat-'em-up game featuring the digitized likeness of actor Steven Seagal was announced in 1994 for the SNES and the Genesis, but was never released. A playable beta prototype of the SNES version of the game was later found and released online.	Riedel Software Productions	TecMagik
Stone Protectors	A video game adaption of the 1993 Stone Protectors animated series was announced for the SNES and the Sega Genesis. While the SNES version released, and the Genesis version was far enough along to have review copies sent to magazines, it never released during the course of the Genesis's lifespan. A near-finished copy later leaked onto the internet in 2010, and was later given an after-market release by Piko Interactive in 2022.	Eurocom	Vic Tokai
Super Castlevania IV	Factor 5 created a one-level prototype of the SNES game for the Sega Genesis in a pitch to Konami to allow them to develop the full game. Konami was impressed with the effort, but ultimately rejected it in favor of beginning to develop its own Genesis projects, which lead to an original entry, Castlevania: Bloodlines (1994) instead.	Factor 5	Konami
Super Off Road: The Baja / Ivan Stewart's Super Off Road Baja 1000	A sequel to Super Off Road (1989) was announced for the SNES, Sega CD, and Sega Genesis. While the SNES version released in 1993, neither Sega version ever materialized.		Williams Entertainment
Super Star Wars	A Genesis version of the 1992 SNES release was in development into 1993 by Sega, but never released. An early prototype of the Genesis version leaked onto the internet in 2020.	Sega	
Surf Ninjas	A video game adaption of the 1993 film Surf Ninjas was announced for the Genesis and Game Gear. While the Game Gear version released the same year, and even showed up as a plot point in the film itself, the Genesis version never materialized.	NuFX	Sega
Survival Arts	A version of the 1993 arcade game was announced for the Genesis and the SNES in 1994, but was quietly cancelled the following year.	Scarab	Sammy
Swamp Thing	A video game adaption of the Swamp Thing comic book character was announced for the NES, Game Boy, and the Genesis, though only the Nintendo versions ever released. The Genesis version leaked onto the internet in 2010.	Microsmiths	Nuvision Entertainment
SWAT Kats	In 2018, Traveller's Tales founder Jon Burton disclosed that the company had worked on a video game adaption of the 1993 SWAT Kats animated television show separate from Hudson Soft's 1995 video game adaption for the SNES. Traveller's Tales' version for the Genesis had previously gone unannounced, and while in active development, was cancelled prior to completion.	Traveller's Tales	
Tank Girl	A video game adaption of the Tank Girl comic franchise, specifically, its 1995 film, was announced, but never materialized.		Ocean Software
Targhan	A version of the 1988 PC game was announced for the Genesis, but never materialized.	Silmarils	Color Dreams
Techno Cop: The Final Mission	Shortly after bringing the 1998 Techno Cop game to the Sega Genesis in 1990, work on a sequel for the Genesis began. The game was present at CES 1992 and far enough along to be scheduled for a November 1992 release, but ultimately never released.	RazorSoft	RazorSoft
Tecmo Cup Football Game	After releasing a Captain Tsubasa video game adaption for the NES in 1992, a follow up version was in development for the Genesis the following year. This version was planned for release in European regions, and would have stripped the Captain Tsubasa (largely only known in Japan) references, but retained the game core gameplay of mixing association football with turn based interactions often part of JRPGs. The game was far enough along to be reviewed in multiple video game magazines in 1993, but the game never released for the Genesis. A late build of the game leaked onto the internet years later, while a similar game released for the Sega CD in 1994.	Tecmo	Sega
TeleGenesis Baseball	A baseball video game announced for the Genesis at CES 1989, with plans to be compatible with the TeleGenesis modem peripheral. As the modem never released, neither did the game.	Sega	Sega
Tempo	According to former Sega staff member Takayuki Kawagoe, Tempo was initially developed for the Mega Drive, but was converted to the 32X on short notice so that it could have a larger game library.	Red Company, Sega	Sega
Tenkū Retsuden Musashi / Kabuki Z	A reworked version of the 1988 arcade game Tenkū Retsuden Musashi was announced for the Genesis under the name Kabuki Z but never materialized.	Kaneko	Kaneko
The Third World War	Originally announced for the Genesis in 1992, it was present at CES 1992 and scheduled for release by the end of the year. However, it was delayed, and when it was released across 1993 and 1994, it only released on the Sega CD.	Micronet co., Ltd.	Bignet USA Inc
Thunder Force V	Production on the fifth installment in the Thunder Force series began on the Mega Drive. According to former Technosoft staff member Naosuke Arai, the team wanted to make the game more exciting with pseudo-3D graphics, but were unhappy with its cheap look compared to Thunder Force IV. Only the first stage was playable before the project was moved to the Sega Saturn and PlayStation.	Technosoft	
Time Trax	A video game adaption of the 1993 television series Time Trax was announced for the SNES and the Genesis. While the SNES version released in 1994, the Genesis version's release was cancelled for undisclosed reasons. A complete build of the Genesis version was later leaked onto the internet 20 years later in 2014, with publications noting that it was largely the same as the released SNES version outside of a different soundtrack composed by Tim Follin.	Malibu Interactive	Malibu Games
Total Carnage	Many console ports of the 1992 arcade game were announced for the early and mid 1990s. Versions for the Sega CD and Genesis were among those announced, and were far enough along to be previewed by magazines, but neither Sega version ever released.	Malibu Games	THQ
Treasure Tails	After the introduction of Tails to Sonic the Hedgehog 2 (1992), staff at Sega Technical Institute pitched a spinoff game for the character that played as an isometric platformer/adventure game. The game was cancelled by February 1993. The developers could not recall how far development progressed, but in 2020, some mock up images discovered from a 1995 video resume were uploaded to the internet.	Sega Technical Institute	Sega
Troll Adventures / World of Trolls	A version of the 1994 SNES release Super Troll Islands was also in development for the Genesis under alternate names Troll Adventures and World of Trolls. It was present at CES 1994, but never materialized.	Millennium Interactive	American Softworks Corporation
Turn and Burn: No-Fly Zone	The game was in development for both the SNES and the Genesis in 1993, with the Genesis version being far enough along to be presented at the European Computer Trade Show late in the year, though only the SNES version materialized when the game launched the following year. Preliminary cover art and screenshots exists.	Imagineering	Absolute Entertainment
Unnecessary Roughness	A Genesis version of the 1993 MS-DOS release was announced, but the Genesis only ever received its yearly follow up, Unnecessary Roughness '95, in 1994.	Accolade	Accolade
Ushiwakamaru Saburota Monogatari: 24-Jikan Tatakaemasu Ka?	Translating to "The Story of Ushiwakamaru: Can You Fight for 24 Hours", the game was based upon a businessman character portrayed by Saburo Tokito. The game would play as a JRPG, but would star a salaryman in modern Japan, where the goal is to complete work projects and overcome antagonistic office co-workers. The game was in development in 1991, and was far enough along to receiv previews in print magazines, but never materialized.	Sega	Sega
Vampire Killer	Showcased at the 1992 WCES. Slated for a September 1992 release.	RazorSoft	RazorSoft
Vette!	A version of the 1989 PC game was announced for the Genesis. It was present across CES 1990 events and shown in print magazines, but it never materialized.	Spectrum HoloByte	Sega
Wacky Races	A video game adaption of the animated television show Wacky Races was in development by Eden Software for the Genesis. Development started in 1993, and the game was entirely completed, but its release was cancelled after publisher Virgin Interactive failed to get the rights to release a game from the franchise. A finished version of the game leaked onto the internet in 2020, while one of its developers put it up on Itch.io for download in 2023.	Eden Software	Virgin Interactive
Walker	Conversion of the Amiga original. Slated for an Autumn 1994 release. Artwork and screenshots exists.	DMA Design	Psygnosis
WCW SuperBrawl Wrestling	Originally in development for the SNES and Genesis in 1994, with a prospective releaese date of October 1994. While the SNES version released that November, the Genesis version never materialized.	Beam Software	FCI
Wheel of Fortune 2	After releasing a video game adaption of the American game show Wheel of Fortune for the Genesis in 1992, a sequel was announced and scheduled for 1994, but never materialized.		GameTek
Whizz / The Castle Game / Top Hat	A version of the 1994 Amiga game was announced for the Genesis, and was far enough along to have review copies sent to magazines, but the game ultimately went unreleased.	Flair Software, Reflections Interactive	Psygnosis, Titus Software
WildSnake	Preliminary cover art exists. A prototype of the game was later discovered by the Video Game History Foundation in 2025, as part of a group of prototypes that had been evaluated for distribution via Sega Channel. Also planned for Game Gear. A ROM image was leaked online.	Bullet-Proof Software, Leadfilm	Spectrum HoloByte
Wimbledon II	Planned sequel to Wimbledon Championship Tennis. Preliminary cover art exists. Released on Master System.	SIMS	Sega
Wing Commander	Conversion of the MS-DOS original. Intended to use a custom ASIC graphics chip on the cartridge.	Electronic Arts	Electronic Arts
Wing Commander II	Conversion of the MS-DOS original. Initially slated for a March 1994 release. Showcased at the 1994 SCES.		Electronic Arts
Wolfenstein 3D	Versions of the 1992 PC game were announced and released for many platforms in the mid-1990s. A Genesis version was announced and showcased at CES 1994, but cancelled later in the year due to technical issues.	Imagineer	Imagineer
World Soccer '94 / World League Soccer	A soccer game was announced to be in development by Codemasters for the Genesis. In early 1994, development was reported to be 50% and aiming for a June 1994 release date, though the game never materialized. Unrelated to the similarly named World League Soccer or World League Soccer '98.	Codemasters	Codemasters
Wrath of the Demon	A port of the 1991 computer game was in development, but never released. A prototype of the game was later discovered by the Video Game History Foundation in 2025, as part of a group of prototypes that had been evaluated for distribution via Sega Channel.		
X-Women: The Sinister Virus	Following the release of X-Men 2: Clone Wars (1995), production began on a third X-Men game for the Genesis, which was set to feature female team members Storm, Jean Grey and Rogue as playable characters. While featured in magazine coverage, the game was ultimately cancelled in 1996. According to former Sega producer John Pedigo, who retains a non-working prototype of the game, the cancellation resulted from developer Clockwork Tortoise failing to reach development milestones on schedule, combined with Sega's decision to move away from Genesis game production by that time.	Clockwork Tortoise	Sega
Xybots	A Genesis port of the 1987 arcade game was showcased at the 1990 Winter Consumer Electronics Show, but failed to materialize.	Tengen	Tengen
Zeewolf	A version of the 1994 Amiga game was announced for the Genesis. While screenshots were shown in print magazines, the Genesis version never materialized.	Binary Asylum	Binary Asylum
Zodiac	A Shoot 'em up game in vein of Starush (1992) in development for the Genesis. The game was in development for 1.5 years, and was completed, but its release was cancelled, as Ubi Soft felt the Genesis market was slowing down and that its release couldn't be profitable. Two of its developers have working copies of the game, but they have not been publicly released or leaked.	Ubi Soft	Ubi Soft
Zombie High	Slated for a February 1993 release. A ROM image was leaked online.	Electronic Arts	Electronic Arts
