= Monsters of the Midway =

Nickname for the NFL's Chicago Bears

The Monsters of the Midway is most widely known as the nickname for the National Football League's Chicago Bears. The nickname became associated with the Bears, who won four championships between 1940 and 1946. The nickname was revived in the Super Bowl era of the NFL to describe the team's dominant defenses, particularly the 1985 Bears team that won Super Bowl XX. Monsters of the Midway is also used by the Bears in marketing campaigns and promotional media.

The nickname was traditionally believed to have originated with the University of Chicago Maroons football team, which was a reference to the Midway Plaisance on the South Side of Chicago, but later research claims it was coined by New York Times sports columnist Arthur Daley on December 9, 1940 in an article describing the Bears’ 73–0 victory over the Washington Redskins in the 1940 NFL championship game.

== Background ==
=== Origins ===
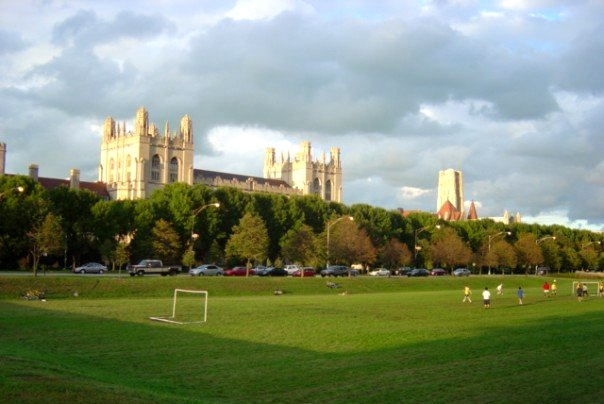
The "Monsters of the Midway" nickname was inspired by the Midway Plaisance.

The nickname Monsters of the Midway was traditionally believed to be referred to the University of Chicago Maroons, a college football program led by Amos Alonzo Stagg. The Maroons were a prominent collegiate football program in the early 1900s, winning two national championships in 1905 and 1913. The nickname is a reference to the Midway Plaisance, a long, green swath of boulevard space bordering the southern end of the campus between 59th and 60th Streets and running from Washington Park to Jackson Park on Chicago's South Side.

The University of Chicago's football program ceased operations in 1939, while the Chicago Bears won six championships between the 1930s and 1940s. Later research found it was coined by the New York Times after the 1940 NFL championship game, and fans and the media started to referred to the Bears as the Monsters of the Midway especially after their lopsided 56–7 victory over the New York Giants in 1943. The Bears also adopted the Maroons’ wishbone "C" logo in 1962. The University of Chicago later revived their football program in 1969.

The nickname is commonly misattributed to Chicago's Midway International Airport or a geographic reference to the city's location in the Midwestern United States.

=== Mid-1980s revival ===
When my family was migrating north back in the '40s and the '50s, they told stories of the Monsters of the Midway. Today I found out for real. They're monsters all right.

— Marvin Powell, New York Jets tackle.

The nickname was revived in 1985 by the Chicago Bears' dominant defense. The team used the "46 defense" to generate immense pressure on opposing offenses and devastate quarterbacks. The 1985 Bears were notorious for knocking opposing quarterbacks out of games with injuries. Former Washington Redskins quarterback Joe Theismann reflected on playing against the Bears in a 45–10 loss that season, commenting "Their intention was to take us out. If you had that kind of physical talent and a scheme that allowed you to take shots at the quarterback, if you didn't take us out legally, you'd be crazy." The 1985 Bears' defense, which was spearheaded by future Pro Football Hall of Famers Mike Singletary, Richard Dent, Dan Hampton, and Steve McMichael, allowed the fewest points and yards that season. The team cruised to a 15–1 regular season record, followed by back-to-back shutouts of the New York Giants and Los Angeles Rams in the playoffs. The season culminated with a 46–10 victory over the New England Patriots in Super Bowl XX. The 1985 Bears are regarded as one of the greatest teams in NFL history. The Monsters of the Midway moniker remained as no other team won more combined games than the Bears between 1984 and 1988.

=== Modern use ===
The Monsters of the Midway nickname has also been a reference to the Bears' defenses, especially the franchise's long history of Hall of Fame middle linebackers, including Bill George, Dick Butkus, Mike Singletary, and Brian Urlacher. The nickname saw a resurgence in 2006, when Urlacher and the Bears' defense led the team to Super Bowl XLI, where they ultimately lost to the Indianapolis Colts.

TSR published a game entitled Monsters of the Midway in a 1982 edition of their magazine Dragon. It was a football simulation with various fantasy characters taking the place of football players. The game 1993 Mutant League Football referenced the name, calling one of its fictional teams the "Midway Monsters". The 2017 Mutant Football League video game, a spiritual successor to Mutant League Football, featured a fictional team called the "Midway Mutants".

In 2013, the Bears partnered with Two by Four/Chicago to create a new marketing campaign, "Believe in Monsters", inspired by the nickname. The Bears also formally trademarked the "Monsters of the Midway" that year. In 2018, the Bears partnered with Israel Idonije to publish a webcomic strip titled, Monsters of the Midway. The comic strip featured current and former Bears players, who fought monsters, cryptids, and villains modeled after other NFL teams. The series was revived for the 2019 season. The Bears have released trading cards based on the Monsters of the Midway comic every season since 2020.
