= Psytronik Software =

- Industry: Retrogaming
- Founded: 1993; 33 years ago
- Founder: Jason Mackenzie
- Headquarters: UK
- Website: www.psytronik.net

Psytronik Software is a British software publisher started in 1993. The company publishes new games for retro gaming platforms: the Commodore 64, Amstrad CPC, Commodore 16, Plus/4, and VIC-20, but also some titles for Windows. Among the games are: Mayhem in Monsterland, Knight 'n' Grail and Maze of the Mummy. Psytronik uses logos with similar design to those of other famous software companies, such as Ocean, Imagine and Psygnosis, on the packaging of its games, companies that have now been out of business for years, as a tribute to the memory of their success. Also curiously, Psytronik uses the same number of letters as Psygnosis. This is also a tribute or in a certain way the desire to preserve legacy.

38 years after the release of Impossible Mission II, Impossible Mission III came out in 2026. Impossible Mission III was released for the same platform, the Commodore 64 computer, even in multiple digital formats for emulators and for the most recent versions of the Commodore 64, such as the Ultimate version and in physical format USB drives, Cartridge, Cassette tape and Floppy disk.

Impossible Mission III was developed by Icon64 under license from Epyx Games, LLC.

== Games ==
=== Games developed or published as Psytronik ===
| Year | Title | Developer | Publisher | Platforms |
|---|---|---|---|---|
| 2025 | Musketeer | Griffonsoft | Psytronik Software | Commodore 64 |
| 2025 | Sherwood | Griffonsoft | Psytronik Software | Commodore 64 |
| 2026 | Impossible Mission III | Icon64 | Psytronik Software | Commodore 64 |
| 2026 | Joan of Arc - Deus Contra Machinam | Griffonsoft | Psytronik Software | Commodore 64 |
