= Impossible Mission II =

1988 video game

- Developer: Novotrade
- Publisher: Epyx
- Platforms: Amiga, Amstrad CPC, Apple II, Apple IIGS, Atari ST, Commodore 64, MS-DOS, NES, ZX Spectrum
- Release: 1988
- Genres: Platform, puzzle
- Mode: Single-player

Impossible Mission II is a video game developed by Novotrade and published by Epyx in 1988. It was released for the Commodore 64, ZX Spectrum, Amstrad CPC, Enterprise 128, Nintendo Entertainment System, MS-DOS, Atari ST, Apple II with at least 128K, Apple IIGS, and Amiga.

Impossible Mission II is a direct sequel to Epyx's 1984 Impossible Mission. It follows directly from the same plot, with Elvin Atombender seeking revenge and the player having to stop him. The overall game structure and basic gameplay is mostly similar, but there are a few differences and new features.

== Gameplay ==
The game takes place in Elvin's fortress, which consists of nine towers. Each of the eight outer towers has a specific theme, such as computers, automobiles, furniture and so on. Each tower consists of several rooms connected by two vertical corridors with elevators and two horizontal corridors leading to other towers. The corridors leading between different towers are locked, and they can only be unlocked by figuring out a numerical puzzle.

Each tower contains the numbers zero through nine in three different colors. The computer interface allows the player to try various number combinations to see if they are correct.

The elevator to the central tower is unlocked by finding a password, which is encoded in a piece of music. Each of the eight outer towers has a musical piece locked inside a safe. The final password consists of six distinct musical pieces. Two of the pieces in the towers are duplicates. The player must rewind the tape so that the next musical piece records over the duplicate, erasing it.

The main addition over the previous game is the addition of new types of enemy robots and devices for the player to use. Whereas the original game only included security bots and a special flying ball robot, Impossible Mission II has the following types of robots:

- Security bot: like in the previous game.
- Shovel bot: tries to push the player character over the edge of a platform.
- Suicide bot: like a shovel bot, but also jumps off the edge itself.
- Mine bot: lays deadly land mines on the floor.
- Pest bot: harmless to the touch, but rides around on the lifts, interfering with the player's traversal.
- Squat bot: springs up from the floor, sending the player character onto a higher floor or crushing him against the ceiling.

The "ball" type robot is no longer present.

As well as snoozes that temporarily freeze the robots and lift resets that move the lifts back to their original positions, the player can now collect bombs and mines that can be used to blow holes in the floor or to open safes. Bombs explode after a specific time, whereas mines explode if the player or an enemy robot touches them.

== Development ==
Unlike most computer game sequels of the time, Impossible Mission II did not use any code from the original game. The graphics were remade from scratch using a bitmap animation tool called Film Director. The lead platform was the Atari ST, with work on the Commodore 64 and ZX Spectrum ports being started once the Atari ST version was nearly complete. All the rooms in Impossible Mission II were redesigned for the ZX Spectrum version.

According to Novotrade programmer László Szenttornyai, who coded the Spectrum version, the NES version of the game "almost wasn't released because of the strict situation between Epyx and Nintendo."

== Reception ==
Reception

Review scores
Publication	Score
Crash	84%
Computer and Video Games	90%
Sinclair User	46%
Your Sinclair	9/10
Zzap!64	96%
ACE	785
The Games Machine	73%

Award
Publication	Award
Zzap!64	Gold Medal

The game received mixed reviews from critics. Common criticisms were the game's overt similarity to and lack of improvement from the original Impossible Mission and the extremely limited sound. However, the challenging puzzles, impressive player character animations, and the tension of playing against the clock were all praised by multiple critics. It was voted best skill game ("Geschicklichkeitsspiel") of 1988 by German magazine PowerPlay.

== Legacy ==
In 2004, Impossible Mission was one of the games included on the C64 Direct-to-TV. Both Impossible Mission and its sequel were also included in the C64 Mini.

Impossible Mission and Impossible Mission II were followed by Impossible Mission 2025, an Amiga exclusive. Impossible Mission 2025 abandoned the corridor layout of different rooms and instead includes one big room. The player also has the choice of three different characters: the normal secret agent, a female gymnast, and an android.

In 2026, a sequel named Impossible Mission III (resembling part I and II again) was published by Psytronik Software for the C64 platform.
