= Mutant League =

- Genre: Animation
- Directed by: Rob Smiley
- Voices of: Mark Fleischer; Jim Herbie; Roman Foster; Kati Star; Rich Buchlloyd; Rob Brousseau; Barbara Jeanne Harrison; Jerry Lee; Robert Panepinto; Doug Stone; William Summers
- Composer: Eric Allaman
- Country of origin: United States
- Original language: English
- No. of seasons: 2
- No. of episodes: 40

Production
- Executive producers: Jeff Franklin; Steve Waterman
- Running time: 30 minutes
- Production companies: Franklin/Waterman 2 Electronic Arts; No. 21PSPLP Incorporated; Active Entertainment

Original release
- Network: First-run syndication
- Release: July 2, 1994 – February 24, 1996

Mutant League is an animated series based on the video games Mutant League Football and Mutant League Hockey which aired from July 2, 1994 to February 24, 1996. The series was distributed by Claster Television and produced by Franklin/Waterman 2 Productions in association with Electronic Arts. 40 episodes were produced.

== Plot ==
During a football game, an earthquake reveals buried toxic waste, and the fumes cause all of the attendees and players to mutate, including young Bones Justice (Bones Jackson in the games). A sports federation based around the superhuman beings, the Mutant League, is formed and Bones grows up to play for the Midway Monsters. Corrupt league commissioner Zalgor Prigg constantly schemes to get the popular athlete to play for any one of the four teams he owns (Slayers, Evils, Derangers or Ooze), or if nothing else discredit him for refusing to join. Bones' search for his father and his personal quest to bring order to the league, are subplots throughout the series. Several other characters from the games like Razor Kidd, Mo and Spew, K.T. Slayer, Grim McSlam and Coach McWimple regularly appear in the show.

Unlike the games, players did not die from their unique approach to contact sports. Although frequently maimed to the point of losing body parts, through treatments in a machine called the Rejuvenator which bathed them in toxic chemicals, they would soon be reinvigorated. The show also has no robot players (except in one episode where K.T. Slayer was benched by robotic clones of himself) and only five teams: the Monsters, the Slayers, the Ooze, the Derangers and the Screaming Evils. It also has the teams competing in all manner of sports, not just the ones seen in the games. Most commonly Football, but also hockey, basketball, soccer, baseball, volleyball and even monster truck races and sumo wrestling. Much like the video games, all of these sports were modified with deathtraps and loose rules on violence to accommodate the near-indestructible nature of the players. Some episodes end with a "grudge match" between two particular players.

A line of action figures was released based on the show, but went virtually unknown.

Rumors of a Mutant League wrestling league surfaced featuring such characters as the Polluter, the Toxic Teacher and "Dad" (or possibly Butch Justice), but apparently never entered production.

== Characters ==
=== Midway Monsters ===
- Bones Justice: The main protagonist of the series, an animated human skeleton. Bones joined the Monsters because it was the only team in the Mutant League that Prigg does not own. Bones seeks out Prigg to learn the truth about his father Butch Justice. He never takes off his shade and his eyes glow red when angered. In one episode, it is also said that he does not need to breathe when the arena is sabotaged by poisonous gas.
- Razor Kidd: A mutant lizard who was dumped by the Slayers and joined the Monsters. He and Bones begin as rivals, but become close friends.
- Mo and Spewter: Twin troll brothers with superior brawn, but minimal intelligence. They literally share a single brain, which they keep in either one of their flip-top skullcaps.
- Darkstar: A tough mutant who loves to fight anyone due to his brutality. After inadvertently knocking down Prigg, as punishment, he was sent to the Monsters where he clashed with Bones until he learned to play fair. Even when he plays fair, he is still brutal to those who threaten his teammates.
- Thrasher: Daughter of Malone. She resembles a gargoyle with orange skin and a yellow fin that drapes over the top of her head like hair. She and Darkstar usually have arguments. Her entrance, as the first female player into the Mutant League, was controversial both for Prigg and the Monsters, but she eventually proved herself to the team. Another episode revolved around one of her stalkers.
- Elanore McWhimple: Owner of the Monsters.
- Malicious Malone: Former Mutant League player-turned Head Coach of the Midway Monsters.
- George McWhimple: Husband of Elanore McWhimple.
- Slick Toxin: A mutant high-school star athlete recruited by Bones Justice. He is the center of a single episode where, after being heart-to-heart to Bones, he decides to quit the league and return to school.
- Cannonball: A mutant that served as the Monsters' baseball pitcher.

=== Slay City Slayers ===
- K.T. Slayer: A troll with brute force and a vicious take-no-prisoners attitude. Slayer is also Prigg's right-hand mutant and team captain of the Slayers. He is the primary rival of Bones and will do almost anything to put Bones out of commission.
- Jackie LaGrunge: A dangerous 9-year veteran, LaGrunge has become even more deadly as this former hybrid evolves into a whiptoid.

=== Derangers ===
- Joe Magician: A mutant obviously punned after Joe Montana, team captain of the Derangers.
- Grim McSlam: A mutant with four arms and punned after Jim McMahon.

=== Screaming Evils ===
- Madman: A demented hyena man, team captain of the Evils.
- Madboy: Son of Madman.

=== Ooze ===
- Liquid Lazer: The team captain of the Ooze. Among team captains, he is the most reluctant to follow Prigg's orders. His body can liquify and reassemble at will.

=== Other characters ===
- Bob Babble: Main announcer for MLSN (Mutant League Sports Network), often seen at times, and frequently heard. He has a voice reminiscent of famed sports announcer Howard Cosell.
- Sherry Steele: MLSN's human female reporter and a secret ally of the Monsters. She becomes close friends with Bones, and often serves as his moral center, particularly in an episode where Bones temporarily uses a wheelchair. As the series progresses, she falls in love with Bones, which she admits to in the series finale, just before Bones travels underground in search of his father.
- Zalgor Prigg: the corrupt commissioner of the Mutant League, owner of the Slay City Slayers, and the primary antagonist of the series. He was once a power-hungry businessman when he was human. Prigg eats live spiders that come out of a humidor-shaped box on his desk. He also is somewhat self-conscious of a set of "knobs" that grow out of the top of his head, in a manner similar to hair plugs.
  - Kang: A werewolf with a Don King hairdo, Prigg's personal assistant. He is frequently pounded on by Prigg for delivering bad news, but his worst fear is being tossed into a fiery pit of demonic lawyers.
- Jukka: A scientist working for Prigg. He is purple-skinned and always wears dark goggles. He runs the rejuvenation tanks. Despite being employed by Prigg, he is often neutral and has even helped the Midway Monsters from time to time.

== Voice cast ==
- Jeff Nimoy : Razor Kidd
- Joey Camen : K.T. Slayer, Kang
- Rob Brousseau : Zalgor Prigg, Jukka and Bob Babble
- Barbara Jeanne Harrison : Elanore McWhimple, Thrasher
- Jerry Lee
- Robert Panepinto
- Doug Stone: Bones Justice
- William Summers
- Mark Fleischer
- Jim Herbie
- Roman Foster
- Kati Star
- Bob Buchholz (credited as Rich Buchlloyd)

== Episodes ==
There are forty episodes altogether: 13 in season one, 27 in season two.

=== Season 1 (1994) ===
No.	Title	Original release date
1	"Opening Kick-Off"	July 2, 1994
2	"Head of the Coach"	July 30, 1994
3	"Frightening Disease"	July 9, 1994
4	"The Fugitive"	July 16, 1994
5	"The Teammate"	July 23, 1994
6	"Troublemakers"	August 6, 1994
7	"Collision Course"	August 13, 1994
8	"The Sumo Match"	August 20, 1994
9	"The Prize of Fame"	August 27, 1994
10	"Boneheads Whodunnit?"	September 3, 1994
11	"The Loser"	September 10, 1994
12	"Breakdown"	September 17, 1994
13	"All-Star Battle Royale"	September 24, 1994

=== Season 2 (1995–1996) ===
No.	Title	Original release date
14	"She's a Girl!"	August 26, 1995
15	"The Great Madman"	September 9, 1995
16	"Razor's Wedge"	September 2, 1995
17	"The Bones Justice Story"	September 16, 1995
18	"The Retirement"	September 23, 1995
19	"Until You Walked in My Shoes..."	September 30, 1995
20	"Scandalous Cad: Part 1"	October 7, 1995
21	"Scandalous Cad: Part 2"	October 14, 1995
22	"The Ultimate Breed"	October 21, 1995
23	"The Recruit"	October 28, 1995
24	"Enter the Skeletoid"	November 4, 1995
25	"Hooked on Buzz"	November 11, 1995
26	"Shoeless Lazer"	November 18, 1995
27	"All-Star Game"	November 25, 1995
28	"The Outing"	December 2, 1995
29	"The Mental Game"	December 9, 1995
30	"Role Model"	December 16, 1995
31	"Strike"	December 23, 1995
32	"The Fanatic"	December 30, 1995
33	"Ultra Fear"	January 6, 1996
34	"City Course"	January 13, 1996
35	"The Comeback"	January 20, 1996
36	"Love Story"	January 27, 1996
37	"In My Father's Name: Part 1"	February 3, 1996
38	"In My Father's Name: Part 2"	February 10, 1996
39	"Sudden Death"	February 17, 1996
40	"The Hall of Pain Awards"	February 24, 1996

== Release ==
=== Home video ===
A 69-minute VHS tape of the show was released in 1996 by Columbia TriStar Home Video, featuring episodes edited together into what was called Mutant League: The Movie.

=== Streaming ===
In 2022, Sony Pictures Television's YouTube channel Throwback Toons began uploading episodes of the series.
