= Knight 'n' Grail =

2009 action-adventure video game

- Developer(s): Wide Pixel Games
- Publisher(s): Psytronik Software
- Designer(s): Mikael Tillander
- Artist(s): Mikael Tillander; Håkon Repstad
- Composer(s): Hans Axelsson
- Platform(s): Commodore 64
- Release: WW: 2009
- Genre(s): Action-adventure
- Mode(s): Single-player

Knight 'n' Grail is a flick-screen action-adventure game released in 2009 for the Commodore 64. It was developed by Swedish indie studio Wide Pixel Games, and published by Psytronik Software. Knight 'n' Grail is set in a castle maze of approximately 100 rooms,

== Plot ==
A demon curses a knight and kidnaps his girlfriend; the knight sets out rescue her and also to find the eponymous grail, the "vessel of restoration", which will lift the curse.

== Gameplay ==
The room vary in dimension from a single screen to several screens wide; the name of the current room is displayed at the bottom of the screen at all times. The various rooms are divided into seven zones, between which the player can pass freely; they are the castle halls, the caverns, the sewers, the dungeons, Zmey Mountain, the Archmage Pass, and the Holy Path (in which lies the grail; finding it ends the game.) The player plays as a knight in a suit of armor who can walk left and right, jump, and swing their sword, which automatically emits a magical projectile blast with each blow.

At the beginning of the game, the player's sword and armor are basic, but they can acquire new equipment that will grant them new abilities. They will also get items that simply grant powers, e.g., the Power of Ostrich bestows a double jump. There are numerous runes hidden throughout the world that will give the player hints when found. The player can open a map screen at any time, which tracks the player's current position and also displays the layouts of all rooms visited to that point. The game does not utilize both music and sound effects at the same time, but instead switches between them every few minutes.

== Reception ==
Knight 'n' Grail received positive reviews. The game received a 94% "Sizzler" rating from Retro Gamer, saying, "Knight ’N’ Grail is hugely enjoyable to play, with tight controls, well-designed and sometimes rather devious locations, and some intense bosses." Jeremy Parish of 1Up.com also praised the game, saying that, although the game is "somewhat hampered by the limitations of the C64", purchasing it was nevertheless a "moral imperative" for the reader. Retroaction awarded the game 91%, noting its "truly stunning appearance" and "brilliantly moody soundtrack", concluding that "[q]uality is apparent in every aspect of Knight 'n' Grail". John Dennis of Retro Gamer CD called it a "fabulous game", saying it had him "glued to the screen from start to finish" and gave it a perfect 5/5 score.
