= Mutant Football League =

2017 video game

- Developer: Digital Dreams Entertainment
- Publisher: Digital Dreams Entertainment
- Composer: Brian L. Schmidt
- Platforms: Microsoft Windows; PlayStation 4 Xbox One; Nintendo Switch
- Release: Windows; October 31, 2017; PlayStation 4, Xbox One; January 19, 2018; Nintendo Switch; October 30, 2018
- Genre: Sports
- Modes: Single-player, multiplayer

Mutant Football League is an American football video game. It is a spiritual successor to Electronic Arts' Mutant League Football. The game was released on Microsoft Windows on October 31, 2017, released for PlayStation 4 and Xbox One on January 19, 2018, and on Nintendo Switch on October 30, 2018.

== Development ==
The game was developed by American studio Digital Dreams Entertainment, led by Michael Mendheim, designer of the original Mutant League Football game. In 2013, Mendheim ran a Kickstarter campaign to fund the game's development, asking for $750,000. The project failed to reach its goal, but Mendheim persisted with the project. In 2017, a second Kickstarter campaign raised a more modest goal of $60,000. Mendheim stated that due to the original funding failure the game will not have as much content as originally planned, and that the main purpose of the second Kickstarter was to fund development of online multiplayer.

== Gameplay ==
Mutant Football League is a violent, over-the-top interpretation of the game of Gridiron football. It draws inspiration from the original Mutant League Football, as well as other games in the genre such as NFL Blitz.

The game features 7-on-7 action, with teams made up of various mutants, namely Skeletal Deadheads, Monstrous Orcs, BruiserBots, Mutant-Humans, Hell-Spawned Demons, Rampaging Werewolves, and Criminal Aliens. The fields are littered with obstacles, including buzzsaws and landmines. Players can call normal plays, as well as "dirty tricks", which include bribing the referee, using a chainsaw to cut through the opposition defense, and rigging the ball with a bomb.

== Teams ==
Many of the teams are parodies of real-life NFL teams, with names like the Nuked London Hatriots and the Deadlanta Vultures. Many players likewise have humorous names spoofing real-life current and former NFL players, such as Bomb Shady, Von Killer, Wham Neutron, Throb Bronkowski, Hatrick Myhomies, Ratspew Splattered, Cooper Pup, and Airbourne Dodgers.

== Reception ==
Reception

Aggregate score
Aggregator	Score
Metacritic	PC: 74/100; PS4: 62/100; XONE: 72/100

== Sequel ==
In early 2022, Digital Dreams Entertainment announced Mutant Football League 2. The game was released for Xbox Series X|S, PS5, and PC on December 10, 2025.
