= Mr. Nutz: Hoppin' Mad =

1994 video game

- Developer: Neon Studios
- Publishers: Ocean; Strictly Limited Games (Genesis)
- Designer: Peter Thierolf
- Composer: Rudolf Stember
- Platforms: Amiga, Genesis
- Release: Amiga: EU: 1994; Genesis/Mega Drive: WW: 2027
- Genre: Platform
- Mode: Single-player

Mr. Nutz: Hoppin' Mad is a side-scrolling platform game developed by German team Neon Studios and published by Ocean Software for the Amiga in 1994. The player controls Mr. Nutz, an anthropomorphic red squirrel wearing shoes, gloves and a cap, who must stop chickens from outer space that are trying to take over the world.

Jumping is the main technique used to navigate platforms and defeat or avoid enemies. There is an overworld map in overhead view in which a small amount of gameplay takes place, and from which the player selects which levels to play.

== Story ==
Alien chickens ran out of food on their home planet, so they took to grilling and eating the inhabitants of other planets. They also began seeding lifeless planets with life so they could return in the future and harvest the inhabitants. One planet they seeded, Peanut Planet, became a popular holiday resort. While Mr. Nutz is vacationing there, the chickens return, and the locals call on Mr. Nutz to save them.

== Gameplay ==
Gameplay

Mr. Nutz: Hoppin' Mad features fast-paced sidescroller platforming which takes after Sega's early-'90s Sonic games. Mr. Nutz primarily attacks by jumping, and can run and roll through the environment at high speed. He can also fly by collecting feathers. An exploration-focused world map connects the platforming levels, with mazes, mild puzzles, items, and NPCs to converse with.

== Development ==
In 1992, a group of ex-Kaiko developers formed Neon Studios and started work on this game under the name Timet: the Flying Squirrel, aiming to outclass the existing Amiga platformers and prove that the Amiga could hold its own against contemporary home consoles. They showed an in-progress version of Timet at the European Computer Trade Show in April 1993, where Ocean took an interest in it and offered them a publishing contract. After signing the game, Ocean decided to change its protagonist to their squirrel character Mr. Nutz, who was slated to star in an unrelated platformer by Ocean for the SNES later that year. They released this game as Mr. Nutz: Hoppin' Mad in 1994, for all models of Amiga.

=== Mega Drive version ===
After finishing the Amiga game, Neon Studios immediately went to work porting it to the Mega Drive. They planned to release the Mega Drive port in Europe in 1995 as Mr. Nutz 2, acting as the sequel of the console Mr. Nutz game which had already been released for this particular system. Although it was tested and previewed in the European and Australian press, Ocean never published the Mega Drive port of Mr. Nutz: Hoppin' Mad.

Strictly Limited Games will release the Mega Drive version in 2027, under license from Atari.

== Reception ==
Reception

Review scores
Publication	Score
Amiga Power	Amiga: 80%
Joystick	Amiga: 92%
The Games Machine (Italy)	Amiga: 93/100
Amiga Games	Amiga: 94%
Games World	SMD: 78%
Mega Zone	SMD: 81%
Play Time	Amiga: 91/100
Amiga Joker	Amiga: 85%
Mega Fun	SMD: 62%
CU Amiga	Amiga: 59%
The One Amiga	Amiga: 77%
Amiga Format	Amiga: 71%

Mr. Nutz: Hoppin' Mad was received quite warmly by the continental European gaming press, with Joystick, The Games Machine, Amiga Games, and Play Time all giving it scores above 90%. Joystick's Pinky said it set a new bar for Amiga platformers or even platformers in general, surpassing Superfrog, Trolls, and Oscar, and proving that the SNES was not superior to the Amiga in graphics. Amiga Games was similarly enthusiastic, praising the bitmap scrolling effect used for the Warp Zone as unique on the Amiga and congratulating the developers for entering the ranks of the programming elite next to studios like Factor 5 and Graftgold.

The response from the British press was more muted. CU Amiga's Tony Dillon complimented the graphics but complained that the platforming levels were too short and that the world map was fit into an overly-small area of the screen, ultimately comparing the game unfavorably with James Pond 3. The One Amiga and Amiga Format found the platforming too derivative of Sonic and the world map too derivative of Zelda and Super Mario World, and both complained that the graphics were technically impressive but hard to visually parse for the sake of gameplay. Amiga Power was more favorable, as well as the Australian magazine Australian Commodore & Amiga Review, both of which said the game was not very original but fun nevertheless.
