= Mr. Nutz =

1994 video game

- European Mega Drive box art
- Developers: Ocean; Planet Interactive Development (GBC); DreamOn Studio (GBA)
- Publishers: Ocean; Infogrames (GBC, GBA)
- Producers: Pierre Adane, Philippe Dessoly
- Designers: Philippe Dessoly; Pierre Adane
- Programmer: Pierre Adane
- Composers: Raphaël Gesqua (original composer, SNES), Matt Furniss (Mega Drive conversion from SNES), Jonathan Dunn (Game Boy conversion from SNES), Allister Brimble, Anthony N. Putson (GBA)
- Platforms: Super NES, Mega Drive/Genesis, Game Boy, Game Boy Color, Game Boy Advance
- Release: SNES: EU: November 1993; NA: August 1994; JP: October 7, 1994; Mega Drive/Genesis: EU: November 1994; NA: 1995 (Sega Channel); Game Boy: EU: 1994; Game Boy Color: EU: 1999; NA: November 1999; Game Boy Advance: EU: 2001
- Genre: Platform
- Mode: Single-player

Mr. Nutz is a 2D side-scrolling platform game published by Ocean Software. It was released for the Super Nintendo Entertainment System in late 1993 in Europe and in North America and Japan in 1994. In 1994, it was released for the Mega Drive as Ocean's first Sega game, and on the Game Boy. It was also released on the Sega Channel in 1995, the Game Boy Color in 1999, and remade for the Game Boy Advance in 2001.

The player controls the one player character, Mr. Nutz, an anthropomorphic red squirrel through six themed levels. The end goal is to stop Mr. Blizzard, a yeti, who is trying to take over the world by using his magic powers to turn it into a mass of ice. Ammunition, in the form of nuts, can be collected and thrown at enemies.

Ocean originally planned to release the game for the Amiga. After the original conversion plan was shelved, Ocean eventually released in 1994 a different game on the Amiga under the name Mr. Nutz: Hoppin' Mad. Developed by Neon Studios, it featured the same titular character but with different, faster and more wide-open gameplay, unrelated levels and enemies, another story, and a large overworld map instead of a linear path to follow in a mini-map. Hoppin' Mad was going to be released for the Sega Mega Drive in 1995 as Mr. Nutz 2, but it got shelved. A playable build exists, leaked in the form of source code and compiled upon.

== Gameplay ==
Mr. Nutz can run, jump, swim in some levels and collect items. The character can jump on most enemies, strike them with his tail, or throw nuts he has collected at them to defeat them. Apart from bosses, most enemies can be killed with one strike. As with many games, contact with hazards and enemies that does not sufficiently defeat them results in losing one unit of health followed by a few seconds of invulnerability as the character sprite flashes. No version contains a time limit, the player may spend as long as they wish on each level, although some versions of the game will reward the player with bonus points for clearing a level quickly. Coins found along the way will not only give points and bonuses during gameplay, but the total amount of coins collected in a level will determine the player's completion bonus at the end of a level. Coins, health, and extra lives are often hidden throughout the levels.

The player starts with a limited number of lives and health units, the amounts are different depending on the difficulty and port. Losing all health results in losing one life and the player must restart at the beginning of the current journey. After losing all lives the player may choose to accept a game over or to continue but must then restart at the beginning of the first journey in the current stage with the default lives and health and zero nuts, coins and score. In all versions except the original Super NES version, passwords are shown when the player reaches certain levels and can be input to start the game from the beginning of that level.

== Development ==
By 1990 after the closure of Ocean France, character designer and graphics artist Philippe Dessoly and programmer Pierre Adane decided to work independently on a platform game for Amiga. When designing a character for the game, Dessoly was considering a turtle or a parrot, but his wife gave him the idea to choose a squirrel. Dessoly did his sketches of the character and enemies in pencil as well as level designs. The game was shown to Ocean Software, which agreed to publish it on the Super NES and Mega Drive/Genesis instead of Amiga, because the console market was safer against piracy and more profitable compared to personal computers. The working title was Squirrel's Game. The developers changed it into Mr. Nuts, but this was considered too pejorative and vague by the English publisher. The final title became Mr. Nutz. The development took 18 months for the Super NES version and 6 months for the Mega Drive version. Some levels, such as a water stage, were removed in the final version. The Game Boy Advance remake contains them as bonus levels.

Dessoly showcased the Super NES version at the 2015 Retro MIA convention.

== Reception ==
Reception

Review scores
Publication	Score			
Publication	Game Boy	GBC	Sega Genesis	SNES
AllGame	N/A	N/A	N/A	3.5/5
Aktueller Software Markt	N/A	N/A	N/A	10/12
Consoles +	N/A	87%	92%	N/A
Computer and Video Games	N/A	2/5	N/A	84/100
GamePro	N/A	N/A	N/A	3.25/5
GameZone	N/A	N/A	N/A	63/100
Hyper	N/A	N/A	75/100	N/A
IGN	N/A	7/10	N/A	N/A
Jeuxvideo.com	14/20	N/A	13/20	13/20
Mega Fun	75%	N/A	75%	77%
Nintendo Power	N/A	N/A	N/A	3.3/5 (Note: Nintendo Power scored the SNES version 3.8/5 for graphics/sound, 3.7/5 for play control, 2.8/5 for challenge, and 2.9/5 for theme/fun.)
Player One	N/A	N/A	94%	N/A
Superjuegos	N/A	91/100	90/100	93/100
Super Play	N/A	N/A	N/A	86%
Total!	N/A	70%	N/A	84%
Video Games (DE)	68%	4/5	69%	68%
Gamers	N/A	N/A	2-	N/A
Game Boy Color Mania	N/A	8/10	N/A	N/A
GB Action	87%	N/A	N/A	N/A
Mega Console	N/A	N/A	86/100	N/A
SNES N-Force	N/A	N/A	N/A	90%
Supersonic	N/A	N/A	93%	N/A
TodoSega	N/A	N/A	86%	N/A
Total! (DE)	2+	N/A	N/A	1-

SNES N-Force gave the game 90%, commending the controls and the graphics which the reviewer likens to "a good children's book." GamePro gave the Super NES version a mixed review. They praised the use of parallax scrolling and the "beautifully drawn" backgrounds, but remarked that "the game play, despite the hidden secret levels and fairly tough challenge, just isn't very interesting."

=== Awards ===
The SNES version won "Best Platform Game" for 1993 by Consoles + magazine.

== Legacy ==
A video game developer, Mr. Nutz Studio, is named after the character.
