= Jelly Boy =

1995 platform video game

- European SNES box art
- Developer: Probe Software
- Publisher: Ocean Software
- Composers: Steve Collett; Nick Stroud
- Platforms: Super NES, Game Boy
- Release: EU: March 1995
- Genre: Platform
- Mode: Single-player

Jelly Boy is a platform game developed by Probe Software for the Super Nintendo Entertainment System and Game Boy. It was published in Europe in 1995 by Ocean Software.

== Gameplay ==
Jelly Boy puts the player in the control of a Jelly Baby with morphing powers. His quest is to find various items inside a factory so that the elevator doorman will allow him to meet the person in charge. The most important items are musical notes, which serve both as an extra life (at 100 notes) as well as a one-hit shield (after a collision, the notes are lost, and further collisions result in death).

== Release ==
The game was a PAL exclusive, and was planned for release in October 1994 in North America, but was delayed. A Sega Mega Drive version was cancelled. In July 2021, Jelly Boy was added to the Nintendo Classics service.

== Reception ==
Reception

Review score
Publication	Score
Computer and Video Games	73% (SNES)

In 1995, Total! ranked Jelly Boy 73rd on their Top 100 SNES Games writing: "On the surface this platformer seems basic but the challenge is big and it's strangely gripping."
