= Harlequin (video game) =

1992 video game

- Developer: The Warp Factory
- Publisher: Gremlin Graphics
- Designer: Ed Campbell
- Composer: Barry Leitch
- Platforms: Amiga, Atari ST
- Release: 1992
- Genre: Platform
- Mode: Single-player

Harlequin is a strategy-based platform game for the Amiga and Atari ST released in 1992 by Gremlin Graphics. The game was written by Andy Finlay, with graphics by Ed Campbell. It was produced by Pete Cook. The sound is credited to Imagitec, and was composed and arranged by Barry Leitch.

A Mega Drive version was planned but never released.

== Gameplay ==
Amiga screenshot

Harlequin takes place across multiple eight-way scrolling levels, each one of which is completely unique, featuring different scenery and enemies. The player character, a harlequin, has returned to his homeworld, Chimerica, to mend its broken heart. To do this, he must find the four pieces that the heart has broken into and take them to the central clock tower.

Finding the pieces of the heart involves strategy and puzzle-solving. Almost every location contains switches that, if flicked, can open up new areas of the current level or change things in different levels, creating new pathways through the game and closing others. Completing the game is thus made more difficult, because the game world evolves as the player interacts with it. The player does not have to play through the levels in any particular order to complete the game, but may often come to a dead end and find it necessary to retrace steps in order to flick a switch that was missed, thereby opening up a new route. Some levels need to be revisited several times to complete the game, and particularly important changes to the game show up on the map that appears between levels, offering clues as to where to go next.

Each level has a different setting and graphical style. Most of the designs are quite odd-looking. For instance, one of the levels is set inside a giant clock tower, another across the rooftops of a city, and another set in Egyptian or Mayan mythology (called "The Dream Mile"). Another level sees the player sucked through a maze of drinking straws (called "Suck It and See"), the mechanics of which mirror a bonus level in that it is packed with health power-ups. Each screen also has background music, and some tunes are shared between several screens.

Power-ups include a burger to replenish health, a space hopper that grants invulnerability and higher jumping, fire-works that act as a sort of partial shield that orbits Harlequin, and an umbrella that can be used as a parachute. There is also a fish power-up that allows Harlequin to turn into an angel fish when in contact with water.

== Chimerica ==
Harlequin is set in a world named Chimerica which has several themed locations. Some locations have to be visited more than once to complete the game:

- The Bomb Run - a land of explosives suspended over a lake.
- The Clock Tower - the outside of Chimerica's central clock tower. Populated by violent alarm clocks and grandfather clocks (complete with beards).
- The Clockworks - the inner workings of the clock tower, with many cogs and girders to leap from. Enemies include orange worms and jumping bolts.
- The Wacky Jugglers - a difficult vertical level that involves jumping from jugglers balls to gain height. One mistake here often means repeating the whole level.
- Cutesy Land - a tongue in cheek spoof of the Mario Bros. series of games - everything in this level tends to have a face, including the water. This world can only be accessed through the Virtual Television in TVee Wonderland. A piece of Chimerica's broken heart is located here.
- The Dream Mile - a bizarre Mayan/Egyptian world complete with pyramids, tombs, scorpions, sand and high winds.
- Fathom This Out! - a swimming pool level containing the dreaded Davey Jones' locker, including Davy Jones' towel and building contract.
- A Flight of Fancy - a flying level where Harlequin is suspended from the bottom of a kite. This level has several guises, one of which is randomly selected when the player enters it.
- The House of Cards - a world based on playing cards, gambling and casinos. Fauna includes card sharks (literally). This world can only be accessed through the Virtual Television in TVee Wonderland.
- Heavens Above! - a twisted version of heaven, taken over by imps and demons.
- Hellzapoppin' - Hell's incarnation is one of the darker, creepier levels. Everything appears in shades of deep purple and grey, with fiery walls and all kinds of dangerous monsters running wild. A piece of Chimerica's broken heart is located here.
- What a Fall? - another sinister world, this time based on Alice in Wonderland. The player must make his way to the bottom of the level from a precarious platform positioned at the very top. The level can only be safely navigated by floating downwards using the umbrella, due to the whole place being full of giant vats of poison (gruesomely labelled "Drink Me") that result in instant death if the player lands in them. Other hazards include deadly dodos and walking watering cans.
- The Jig-saw Puzzle - the jigsaw puzzle requires the player to restructure it by finding the right levers. A lot of the monsters here are eyeball-based.
- The Learning Curve - a world based on children's TV programmes, much like Play School on the BBC, full of giant colouring pencils, Lego blocks and monstrous toys. This world can only be accessed through the Virtual Television in TVee Wonderland.
- A Dark and Gloomy Place - A world of ghosts, zombies and dark, damp, dripping crypts. This level can only be accessed when a gigantic chimney has been built on "A Walk Across the Rooftops" (achieved by flicking a switch in "Fathom This Out" which makes Davy Jones sign his building contract, granting permission for construction work to proceed), allowing the player to drop down into the mortuary building.
- The Organ Chamber - in this world Harlequin is shrunk and the world is a giant pipe organ. If playing the game with sound effects instead of music, the player will find that the keys of the organ actually produce the correct notes when ran across.
- A Walk Across the Rooftops - a world above a city, including violent satellite dishes and deadly chimneys. A piece of Chimerica's broken heart is located here.
- Sewercide - a maze of piranha-infested sewer pipes. Careful use of the Angel Fish power-up is needed here.
- A Little Sheet Muzak - the final level of the game, which can only be accessed after the player flicks an all-important switch in Hellzapoppin'. The entrance to this level is located in The Organ Chamber world - when the necessary switch has been activated, the music book in the middle of the level will open, allowing the player to jump inside. "A Little Sheet Muzak" is like a giant page of the book, and the player is required to use the musical notes as platforms, hopping towards the exit while avoiding gigantic bookworms. The final piece of Chimerica's broken heart is located here, but this level is impossible to leave except by jumping into the giant heart symbol at the top, which automatically ends the game. It is vital, therefore, to ensure that the other three pieces of Chimerica's heart have been collected before the player character enters the level.
- Suck It and See? - a maze of drinking straws, filled with goodies and continue bonuses. There is a 60-second time limit in effect here, and, if the player fails to leave the level before it expires, all the bonuses vanish forever. If the player manages to leave in time, the level can be revisited with all the bonuses replenished.
- Throat of the Machine - a strange vertical level that includes weird pink maggots and giant fly-aliens in bubbles. The entrance to this level is found in the Clockworks, but it only appears after the player flicks certain switches in other worlds.
- TVee Wonderland - a creepy television superstore where every single TV is broken, and hopping lightbulbs, deadly sparks and other mis-firing electronics threaten the player character's life. Deep within the bowels of this level is the Virtual TV (VTV), which is vital for accessing three other levels. The programme being broadcast can be changed on the VTV by flicking switches in other worlds, and by jumping into the VTV screen the players can enter the new environments.
- Beating the Drum - a very difficult level, filled with dangerous percussive instruments. Some of the drums act as trampolines to higher places. This level is accessible from "Suck it and See?" and even then only late into the game. Although it provides one entrance to The Organ Chamber, Beating the Drum is the only extraneous stage in the game. It is a difficult place to traverse and there is no real reason to enter it, as there are no switches.

== Reception ==
The game received a score of 900/1000 from ACE. The magazine's Gary Whitta called the game "an acquired taste to be sure - but one you'd do well to acquire".
