= The Shadow (video game) =

1994 video game

- Preliminary North American SNES cover art
- Developer: Ocean Software
- Publisher: Ocean Software
- Designers: Brian Flanagan; Ivan Davies
- Programmer: Robbie Tinman
- Artists: Mark Povey; Martin McDonald; Matthew Wood
- Composer: Jonathan Dunn
- Series: The Shadow
- Platforms: Atari Jaguar CD; Sega Genesis; SNES
- Release: Unreleased
- Genre: Beat 'em up
- Mode: Single-player

The Shadow is a video game based on the 1994 Universal film of the same name. It was planned for release in 1994 on the Super NES, alongside other systems, but was canceled.

== Gameplay ==
The Shadow battles various enemies in the game.

The gameplay is similar to other Beat 'em up games such as Final Fight or Double Dragon, where the player controls The Shadow through several levels (including streets, museums, carnivals and laboratories) fighting against various enemies, like hoodlums, Mongol Warriors, scientists, security guards and sailors. The player has two bars; one is the life bar and the other is a bar which allows the player to perform special moves (invisibility, a lunging dash and a dome force field that knocks down everyone who is caught in its radius). The regular beat 'em up levels also include a section for gunplay, where the player is able to shoot enemies. It also contains a driving stage where The Shadow battles the Mongols on motorbikes (Maritech Labs).

== Plot ==
The game roughly follows the plot of the movie, where The Shadow fights crime in New York city, until he is confronted by the evil mastermind Shiwan Khan. Khan intends to use an atomic bomb to blow up the city, culminating in a showdown at the hidden Hotel Monolith.

== Development ==
The Shadow was developed by British studio Ocean Software, which was famous for acquiring licenses for games based on major motion pictures during this period. Ocean's vice president of development, Gary Bracey, considered The Shadow as the next big movie license after the company's Batman. Though not particularly impressed with the script for The Shadow, Bracey was able to meet with the film's director Russell Mulcahy and star Alec Baldwin while optioning the game tie-in. Production on the game was led by Brian Flanagan, who described it as a "messy project". Flanagan was its designer and lead artist, having created its sprites and a large portion of its backgrounds. Versions were developed for the SNES and Sega Genesis. The SNES version was completed and review copies were even sent to gaming magazines prior to its scheduled release. However, it was ultimately cancelled due to the film's low box-office gross.

A version of the game was also being developed and planned to be published by Ocean Software for the Atari Jaguar CD as one of the first games announced for the then-upcoming add-on. However, development for the port was scrapped in favor of creating a conversion of Lobo, an unreleased fighting game based on the DC Comics character of the same name that was also in development by Ocean.

== Reception ==
Reception

Review scores
Publication	Score
Electronic Gaming Monthly	(SNES) 26 / 50
Game Players	(SNES) 62%
GamePro	(SNES) 14 / 20
HobbyConsolas	(SNES) 67 / 100
Micromanía	(SNES) 80%
Next Generation	(SNES) 2/5
Nintendo Power	(SNES) 12.6 / 20

Next Generation reviewed the SNES version of the game, rating it two stars out of five, and stated that "The Shadow boils down to a 'take-it-or-leave-it' no-brainer of a title".
