= Super Troll Islands =

1994 video game

- North American cover art
- Developer: Millennium Interactive
- Publishers: EU, NA: American Softworks Corporation; JP: Kemco
- Designers: Mike Ball; Tim Closs
- Composer: Richard Joseph
- Platform: Super NES
- Release: EU: 1994; NA: February 1994; JP: March 25, 1994
- Genre: Platform
- Mode: Single-player

Super Troll Islands (Note: Super Troll Islands (スーパートロールアイランド, Sūpā Torōru Airando)) is a 1994 platform game, based on the license of bright-haired toys known as Troll dolls, developed by Millennium Interactive for the SNES. A Sega Genesis version was planned but never released.

== Gameplay ==
Each scrolling level is initially shrouded in an animated "mist" until they are cleared by running around platforms and ladders in any order, bringing color to an initially greyscale game tile. A brightly coloured background is revealed after the player makes the mist vanish into thin air.

== Mr Blobby ==
The game was reskinned for Amiga and MS-DOS as Mr Blobby, based on the character from the British TV series Noel's House Party. The gameplay remained the same, but the Troll characters were replaced with Mr Blobby and his family.

== Reception ==
Reception

Review scores
Publication	Score
Computer and Video Games	83/100
Electronic Gaming Monthly	6/10
Famitsu	6/10, 7/10, 6/10, 4/10

Electronic Gaming Monthly gave Super Troll Islands a 6 out of 10 rating in their December 1993 review. In 1995, Total! ranked Super Troll Islands a 95th on their Top 100 SNES Games writing: "A big platformer that's a bit weird."
