= Mutant League Hockey =

1994 video game

- Developers: Abalone; Mutant Productions
- Publisher: Electronic Arts
- Producer: Keith Orr
- Designers: Michael Mendheim; Alan H. Martin
- Programmer: Glyn Anderson
- Artist: Steve M. Suhy
- Writer: Michael Humes
- Composers: Russell Lieblich; Michael J. Sokyrka
- Platform: Genesis
- Release: EU: March 1994; NA: May 1994
- Genre: Sports
- Modes: Single-player, multiplayer

Reception

Review score
Publication	Score
Hyper	66/100

Mutant League Hockey is an ice hockey video game that was released in 1994 for the Sega Genesis. It is the follow up to Mutant League Football (1993).

== Gameplay ==
Unlike Mutant League Football which featured five mutant species, Mutant League Hockey narrows it down to three: robots, undead skeletons and trolls, removing aliens and superhumans. The game has the same tone as its predecessor, with special plays that can cause different things to happen like making the puck explode when it is picked up by an opposing player and bribing the referee to call fake penalties against the other team. Land mines and holes are also present on the ice.

The teams in the game are ranked by a rating of zero through six skulls.

As with Mutant League Football, hazards litter the ice and death is commonplace. Players may substitute their goalie for a demon goalie, a huge demon head that takes the place of the net; scoring on a demon goal causes it to explode. In addition, the crowd is prone to throwing weapons or other powerups onto the ice; they may be picked up and used freely. When a player dies, their corpse remains on the ice and may be tripped on; between periods, a giant slug acting as an ice resurfacer eats the debris littering the ice. As in real hockey, fights may break out. Fights in Mutant League Hockey are done as a minigame, where the objective is to knock out the opponent. Both players are still sent to the penalty box, but the player who got knocked out also takes an additional penalty for losing.
