= Impossible Mission 2025 =

1994 video game

- Developer: MicroProse
- Publisher: MicroProse
- Producer: Stephen Hand
- Designers: Seth Walker; Scott Johnson
- Programmer: Paul Dunning
- Composer: Allister Brimble
- Platforms: Amiga, Amiga CD32
- Release: 1994
- Genre: Action
- Mode: Single player

Impossible Mission 2025 is a side scrolling platform and action game for the Amiga computer system, a remake of the 1984 game Impossible Mission, and released by MicroProse in 1994 as two different versions: one for the Amiga 500 and 600 systems, and one for the Amiga Advanced Graphics Architecture-enhanced Amiga 1200, 4000, and CD32 systems. Console conversions were being developed for the Super NES and Sega Genesis, but never released.

== Characters ==
The player can choose to play as the female Tasha, male Felix Fly, or robot RAM 2. Each has different strengths and weaknesses.

== Development ==
Producer Stuart Whyte explained the motivation behind Impossible Mission 2025:

We looked at "classic" games that were due for a remake for console. At the time there had been some successful reboots and we were big fans of the original Impossible Mission. The original game was iconic and, for its time, technically cutting-edge. From memory it was relatively easy to acquire the license - the harder task, which ultimately proved impossible, was tracking down the original source and assets, as we wanted, from the off, to include the original game.

The source code for Impossible Mission had been lost in an earthquake, so programmers Tim Cannell and Paul Dunning had to hack the Commodore 64 version of the game and retrieve its assets so that the game could be included in Impossible Mission 2025. For the new game, lead designer Scott Johnson recalled, "We really wanted to have scrolling included but still retain the essence of the original gameplay. What I really wanted to keep was the awesome animation from the originals. We ended up building the characters as 3D meshes in 3DS and rendering the animation out as bitmaps."

The appearance of Elvin Atombender was difficult to pull off, according to artist Drew Northcott. To get a visual image of the powersuit's "mix of encumbrance and empowerment", Northcott taped bricks to his bike boots and mic stands to his arms, then stomped around an empty office while art director Andy Cook videotaped him.

The game was originally developed for the Super NES and Genesis, with the Amiga versions to follow after. The Super NES version was announced in 1994, but neither it nor the Genesis version were released. Whyte explained, "... Microprose had gotten way late into the console space and were trying to catch up, and the 16-bit consoles were reaching the end of their lifespan. Ordering large quantities of cartridges from Japan was a risky thing, and due to this there were fewer releases than we'd hoped." A review was published in the August 1994 issue (Volume 63) of Nintendo Power, which claimed the Super NES version would've featured more sophisticated graphics and smoother play control than the prior versions.

== Technical information ==
There are three versions of Impossible Mission 2025. A standard version for the Amiga 500 and Amiga 600, an enhanced (AGA) version for the Amiga 1200 and Amiga 4000 systems and a CD32 version based on the AGA. The versions required 1 and 2MB of RAM respectively. The game is hard disk installable. There is manual copy protection which involves the user being required to type the number from the bottom of a specific page. The game also comes with a built in system which will make fair use backups for the user. The CD32 version received additional animations for intro, ending and between levels, and CD audio music.

== See also ==
- List of Amiga games
