= Mutant League Football =

1993 video game

- North American cover art
- Developer: Mutant Productions
- Publisher: Electronic Arts
- Producer: Sam Nelson
- Designers: Michael Mendheim, Alan Martin
- Programmer: Gil Colgate
- Artist: Arthur Koch
- Composer: Brian Schmidt
- Platform: Sega Genesis
- Release: NA: May 1993; EU: July 1993
- Genre: Sports
- Modes: Single-player, multiplayer

Mutant League Football is a video game that was originally released in 1993 for the Sega Genesis. The game was designed using an engine designed specifically for it, and features a different take on gridiron football, where it resembles a war as much as a sporting competition.

A year later, the same team applied similar concepts to the sport of ice hockey to create Mutant League Hockey. An animated TV series based around the games, Mutant League, aired from July 1994 to February 1996, while a spiritual successor, Mutant Football League was released in 2017.

== Gameplay ==
In-game screenshot

The game deviates from usual football simulations in several ways. It most notably takes place in a post-apocalyptic world where radiation has caused the human race to mutate and the dead to rise from the grave. The instruction manual states that the exact causes of the upheaval have been lost or corrupted, due to (among many things) the chaos of an alien invasion, spin control, a sloppy filing system set up by a temp, and what appears to be barbecue sauce.

Landmines, fire pits, and other hazards (such as areas being open to empty space) litter the field, which can be made of rock, ice, or even toxic waste or rubber. Players can lose health or die during the run of play which will cause them to fumble. Teams have special Nasty Audibles, which are dirty, violent tricks such as exploding balls, invisibility, electric shocks, jet packs, or tackling the other quarterback with the intent to kill. All of this can result in large gains and/or horrific casualties. Killing enough players causes an opposing team to forfeit.

Each team can "bribe ref" twice per game (once in each half). The bribed referee will call phony penalties (e.g. 5-yard penalty for crying) on the opposing team. This will last for a few plays, but the other team usually tries to kill him (one of the Nasty Audibles that can actually be played at any time) immediately after the first dirty call. A slain ref is then replaced by an even tougher one, who will promptly call another 5-yard penalty on the murdering team for Ref Bashing. Note that accidental referee deaths, such as being caught in the middle of a pileup, or nudged into a mine, are not penalized. Other penalties include offsides (encroachment also counts as this penalty), illegal kick, delay of game, QB bashing, and pass interference. All of these penalties are 5-yard penalties except pass interference, which is an automatic first down.

Gameplay can take place in the form of a pickup game or full-season mode. Winning the championship game in season mode results in the losing team exploding spontaneously, and the winning team's MVP perishing by induction into the "Hole of Flame". The induction ceremony depicts the game referees snatching the MVP and stuffing him into a firepit.

== Teams ==
Teams are composed of aliens, skeletons, robots, trolls, and superhumans. Seven players are on the field for each team, instead of the usual eleven. Many of the teams are based on real life teams, with names like the Deathskin Razors and the Midway Monsters. Players also have humorous names, like Bones Jackson (Bo Jackson), L.T. Impaler (Lawrence Taylor), Joe Magician (Joe Montana) and Scary Ice (Jerry Rice). However, despite all of the death and destruction, the competition aspect is still high, and requires much strategy, especially compared to games like NFL Blitz.

== Legacy ==
This game was followed by a spin-off titled Mutant League Hockey. A basketball game, Mutant League Basketball, was in development, but was never released. These games were also used as the basis for an animated series called Mutant League, which aired from 1994 to 1996. Another spin-off, Mutant Speed Demons, was planned, but never released. However, a non-working prototype was found in 2009.

The game inspired a one-off series in the British children's comic Sonic the Comic. The story, entitled "Bring Me the Head of Coach Brikka", was written by Steve White and Brian Williamson, with art by Williamson and Anthony Williams, and ran for six parts in 1994.

Electronic Arts included the game in the PlayStation Portable (PSP) compilation EA Replay. It was released in the United States on November 14, 2006. The PSP allowed a higher resolution for the game than seen on the Genesis, therefore bringing better graphics to the game when played on a television screen via the new PSP Slim & Lite's output capabilities.

In the Xbox 360 version of the video game Madden NFL 09, there is an achievement worth 50 gamerscore titled "Midway Monster". The achievement is unlocked by creating a player named "Bones Jackson" and placing him on the Chicago Bears.

A spiritual successor called Mutant Football League has been developed by Digital Dreams Entertainment for the PC, Xbox One, PS4, and mobile platforms. This has been headed up by Michael Mendheim, the original creator and lead designer of the Mutant League series.

== Reception ==
Reception

Review score
| Publication | Score |
|---|---|
| AllGame | 3.5/5 |

== See also ==
- Blood Bowl
