= Impossible Mission =

1984 video game

- Developer: Epyx
- Publishers: NA: Epyx; EU: CBS, U.S. Gold
- Designer: Dennis Caswell
- Platforms: Commodore 64, Acorn Electron, Amstrad CPC, Apple II, Atari 7800, BBC Micro, Master System, ZX Spectrum
- Release: Commodore 64: NA: 1984; EU: November 1984; Ports; June 1985: Apple II; 1985: Electron, BBC, Spectrum; 1986: Amstrad CPC; 1987: Atari 7800; November 1990: Master System
- Genres: Platform, puzzle
- Mode: Single-player

Impossible Mission is a video game written for the Commodore 64 by Dennis Caswell and published by Epyx in 1984. The game features a variety of gameplay mechanics from platform and adventure games, and includes digitized speech. Impossible Mission, which casts the player in the role of a secret agent infiltrating an enemy stronghold, is considered one of the best games for several platforms.

From 1985 to 1990, the game was released for the Apple II, Atari 7800, ZX Spectrum, Acorn Electron, BBC Micro, Amstrad CPC, and Master System.

== Gameplay ==
The Commodore 64 original

The player takes the role of a secret agent who must stop an evil genius, Professor Elvin Atombender, who is believed to be tampering with national security computers. The player races against the clock to reassemble and decrypt the password to Atombender's control room while avoiding deadly robots. Password pieces are found by searching furniture in the rooms. When searching, the player can also reset all moveable platforms and freeze enemy robots for a limited time. The game also features similar rewards for completing bonus puzzles. Impossible Mission enemies include two types of enemies. The first are the robots. These have a cylindrical main body. Their bodies are electrified, and some are able to use a short-range death ray. Some are stationary; others move in patterns, and others specifically hunt the player. Some have to actually see the player, and others know where the player is at all times. The second enemy is a hovering, electrified ball. Most of these chase the player.

The player has six hours of game time to collect 36 puzzle pieces. Every time the player dies, 10 minutes are deducted from the total time. The puzzle pieces are assembled in groups of four. The puzzle pieces overlap so that three pieces can be assembled before the player realizes he must start over. Pieces may be in the wrong orientation, and the player may have to use the horizontal or vertical mirror images. Additionally, the puzzle pieces are randomized in every game. A completed puzzle forms a nine-letter password which lets the player reach Professor Atombender.

== Development ==
The first element of the game to be created was the player character's animations, which designer Dennis Caswell lifted from a library book about athletics. Caswell recalled, "I animated the somersault before I had any clear idea how it would be used. I included it because the animations were there for the taking ..." Caswell cites Rogue as his inspiration for the randomised room layouts, and the electronic game Simon as his inspiration for the musical checkerboard puzzles. The hovering balls were inspired by the Rover "security guard" from the Prisoner TV series.

The Commodore 64 version features early use of digitized speech: "Another visitor. Stay a while... stay forever!", "Destroy him, my robots!", and a lengthy scream - later also heard in Beach Head II: The Dictator Strikes Back - when the player falls down a shaft. The digitized speech was provided by the company Electronic Speech Systems, who drastically raised their prices after Impossible Mission became a successful test case. Epyx did not deal with ESS again as a result. Caswell recounted:

I never met the performer but, when I supplied the script to the representative from ESS, I told him I had in mind a "50-ish English guy", thinking of the sort of arch-villain James Bond might encounter. I was told that they happened to have just such a person on their staff. When I was given the initial recordings, the ESS guy was apologetic about them being a touch hammy, but I thought the over-acting was amusing and appropriate, and they were left as is ...

The game's title was one of the last elements to be finished. According to Caswell, "The choice of a name was delayed as long as possible, and Impossible Mission was more resorted to than chosen. It was, at least, somewhat descriptive, and the obvious allusion to Mission: Impossible was expedient, to the extent that both the game and the TV show involved high-tech intrigue."

== Reception ==
Master System gameplay

In the April 1985 issue, Computer & Video Games rated the Commodore 64 version 38 out of 40 and awarded it Game of the Month. In May 1985, Zzap!64 editors ranked Impossible Mission second in their list of the best Commodore 64 games, while readers ranked it first, with 26% of votes. Citing Impossible Mission as example, Compute!'s Gazette in 1986 praised Caswell as "one of those rare people who has all the skills necessary to create and design an outstanding game" while software development teams were becoming more common.

COMPUTE! listed the game in May 1988 as one of "Our Favorite Games", writing that the sound effects of the character committing suicide was one of their guilty pleasures. Console XS rated the Sega Master System version 89% in 1992.

Editors have praised it as "the first game that scared me" thanks to its early use of digitized voice and mood setting audio effects. Stuff magazine listed it as one of the 10 best games for the Commodore 64 in their Commodore 64 at 40 article.

== Legacy ==
A sequel, Impossible Mission II, followed in 1988. It further complicated the quest with new traps and items. Elvin's stronghold also grew in size, divided into a number of towers which the player had to traverse, all the while picking up pieces of the password.

The game Electrocop was rumored to have started as a sequel to Impossible Mission, but this has not been substantiated. In 1994, Impossible Mission 2025 was released for the Amiga. It kept the same idea as the previous games, and mainly featured updated graphics and audio, also allowing the player to choose among three different characters. The game also contains the Commodore 64 version of Impossible Mission.

Developers System 3 revamped Impossible Mission for the Sony PSP, Nintendo DS and Wii. In the US, the Nintendo DS version was released exclusively at GameStop stores by Codemasters (which, similar to the Amiga sequel, included a filter for graphics and audio to recreate the C64 original of Impossible Mission in terms of look and sound, albeit slightly remastered) and the Wii version was released in March 2008. This revamped version was later ported to the Nintendo Switch in 2019.

In late 2022, it was announced that an officially licensed sequel is being developed by Icon64.
