= LocoScript =

Word processing software package

- LocoScript 1.40's initial file management screen
- Developers: Locomotive Software; LocoScript Software
- Initial release: 1985; 41 years ago
- Operating system: Standalone (PCW), MS-DOS
- Platform: Amstrad PCW, IBM PC compatibles
- Type: Word processor
- Website: locoscript-software.square.site

LocoScript is a word processing software package created by Locomotive Software and first released with the Amstrad PCW, a personal computer launched in 1985. Early versions of LocoScript were noted for combining a wide range of facilities with outstanding ease of use. This and the low price of the hardware made it one of the best-selling word processors of the late 1980s. Four major versions of LocoScript were published for the PCW, and two for IBM PC compatibles running MS-DOS. LocoScript's market share did not expand with the PC versions, which were not released until after Windows had become the dominant PC operating system.

== Background and reception ==
LocoScript's developers, Locomotive Software, had produced Locomotive BASIC for Amstrad's CPC 464 home computer, introduced in 1984. For the Amstrad PCW, introduced in 1985, Locomotive produced the LocoScript word processor and Mallard BASIC, and also wrote the PCW's User Guide. These programs and a dot matrix printer were included in the price of the PCW, which was £399 plus VAT for the base model. The PCW, regarded as extremely good value for money, gained 60% of the UK home computer market, and 20% of the European personal computer market. According to Personal Computer World, the PCW "got the technophobes using computers".

LocoScript was regarded as easier to use than WordStar and WordPerfect, which in the mid-1980s were the dominant word processors on IBM PC compatibles, and many users needed no additional information beyond what the manual's "first 20 minutes" introductory chapter provided. The PCW's keyboard offered clearly labelled, one-press special keys for many common LocoScript functions, including cut, copy, and paste, while LocoScript's competitors required a wide range of key combinations that the user had to remember. Most of the program's other features were presented via a pull-down menu bar in which the top-level options were activated by function keys. The menu system had two structures, one for beginners and the other for experienced users. Locomotive Software's slogan for the product was "Everything you need, nothing you don't." However, LocoScript version 1 was regarded as relatively slow.

When the PCW product line was discontinued in 1998, The Daily Telegraph said that the range of independently produced add-on software for LocoScript had contributed to the series' longevity.

LocoScript faded into obscurity because its developers were slow to produce a version for IBM-compatible PCs. By the time they released a version that ran under MS-DOS, Windows was becoming the dominant operating system. The developers of WordPerfect made a similar mistake, releasing their first Windows version in 1991, shortly after the second Windows version of Microsoft Word.

As late as 1993, a journalist found "special characters" much easier to produce on LocoScript than on PC word processing software.

== Versions and capabilities ==
=== LocoScript ===
LocoScript was the principal software included with Amstrad's PCW 8256 and PCW 8512, both of which launched in 1985. LocoScript did not run under the control of an operating system; instead, the computer was booted from the LocoScript floppy disk, and LocoScript ran exclusively on the system. The user had to reboot in order to run any other program (a variety of CP/M applications were supplied on a separate disk). In later years a third-party utility called "Flipper" eventually became available, restricted to those PCWs with the greatest RAM memory, which could divide the bigger memory between LocoScript and CP/M, allowing both to run without the need to reboot.

On start-up LocoScript displayed a file management menu, like WordStar but unlike WordPerfect, Microsoft Word and other modern word processors, which start with an empty document. LocoScript enabled users to divide documents into groups, display all the groups on a disk and then the documents in the selected group, and set up a template for each group. File names were restricted to the "8.3" format, but the edit facilities enabled users to add summaries up to 90 characters long, which they could display from the file menu. The "limbo file" facility enabled users to recover accidentally deleted documents until the disk ran out of space (there was no hard disk, all files were stored on floppy disks), when the software would permanently delete files from "limbo" to make room for new ones. Journalist Dave Langford published a collection of his articles about the PCW, and titled it "The Limbo Files". LocoScript was designed to accommodate add-on programs, which could be selected via the file manager.

LocoScript supported 150 characters. For each language supported by the PCW, the keyboard and LocoScript were configured so that users could easily type all of the normal character set. Various other languages' characters could be typed by holding down the ALT or EXTRA key, along with the SHIFT key if capitals were required. LocoScript could also display mathematical and technical symbols. All these characters and symbols could be printed, unless the printer was a daisy wheel unit.

LocoScript's menu system enabled users to add, singly or in combination, a range of sophisticated typographical effects: monospaced or proportional character spacing; normal or double width characters and spacing; various font sizes; bold, underline, italics, subscript or superscript, and reverse video. All of these except those that affected font size and spacing were displayed on the screen. Reverse video was an on-screen reminder to the user and was never printed, while the other effects were printed, except on daisy wheel printers.

Users could optionally set up to two page headers and footers, and could tell LocoScript whether to use one header or footer on odd pages and the other on even pages, one header or footer for the first or last page and another for all the rest, or to omit a header or footer on the first or last page. The program provided codes for the current page number and total number of pages, and aligning them to the left, centre, or right, and for decorations such as leading and trailing hyphens (e.g. "-9-"). LocoScript automatically avoided widows and orphans, ensuring that, if a paragraph of four or more lines split across pages, at least two lines appeared on each page. Users could also tell LocoScript to keep a group of lines or paragraphs together on the same page, or to avoid splitting paragraphs throughout a document, and could force page breaks.

Users could control placement of text by means of: margins; indentation; normal tab stops; decimal tab stops, which set the position of the decimal point rather than the start of a number; and left, right or full justification. Different combinations of these settings, called "layouts", were automatically numbered, which made it possible to re-use layouts and to make changes that applied to all parts of a document where a specified layout was used. These facilities could be used for presenting tables.

LocoScript's cut, copy and paste facility provided 10 paste buffers ("blocks"), each of which was designated by a number and could be saved for re-use in a different document. Users could also save up to 26 short phrases, identified by letters, although the size of individual phrases and of the whole collection of phrases was limited. Both phrases and paste blocks could be inspected via a menu option. In addition, users could insert whole files, which could be either LocoScript documents or ASCII text files. The "find" and "find and replace" facilities could operate on a whole document, or small sections of one, and "find and replace" ("exchange" in the manual's terminology) had an option to confirm each change or just go ahead.

The program did not immediately reflow text after major insertions or deletions, but did this when the user pressed the RELAY key, or automatically if the user moved the cursor through the changed passage.

LocoScript allowed the user to edit one document while printing another, so that the relative slowness of the bundled dot matrix printer seldom caused difficulties. Users could ask for all of a document to be printed or a range of pages, set the print quality to "high quality" or "draft", and set the paper used to single-sheet or continuous stationery. LocoScript automatically adjusted the size of margins so that the same number of lines per page appeared on both single-sheet and continuous stationery. Since the printer only accepted one sheet of single-sheet paper at a time, LocoScript displayed a prompt at the end of each page when in single-sheet mode. The program also had the ability to resume at a specified page after a paper jam. In addition to printing LocoScript documents, the program had a "direct printing" mode which operated like a typewriter, printing each piece of text after the user pressed RETURN. This could be used for completing forms.

The original LocoScript version 1 had no spell checker or mail merge facilities. Both were available by December 1986.

Despite the sophistication of the software, the great drawback of the PCWs was the exclusive reliance of the early models (the PCW 8256 and 8512) on a poor quality dot matrix printer, coupled with the eventual introduction (with the 9512) of a high quality daisy wheel printer that could not print any of the wide range of non-alphanumeric symbols which the LocoScript software was capable of producing. The software was seriously hamstrung by the poor quality of the hardware: but this was due in large part to a commercial decision not to provide any support for third-party printers so long as the software remained exclusive to the PCW format.

=== LocoScript 2 ===
LocoScript 2 was bundled with the Amstrad PCW 9512, introduced in 1987. This version was significantly faster, included the LocoSpell spell checker, and came bundled with a high-quality daisy wheel printer in addition to supporting the original dot matrix printer. The software increased its character set to 400 and allowed users to define up to 16 of their own characters.

It could also format, copy and verify disks by itself, instead of requiring the user to switch to CP/M and use the Disc Kit utility. Copying via LocoScript, however, could be much slower. Due to the word processor occupying more RAM than the CP/M system, and so leaving less usable space on the RAM disk, copying had to be done in smaller, more numerous stages.

Besides the addition of LocoSpell, LocoScript 2 was also the earliest version to support the optional LocoFile add-on, providing database functionality.

=== LocoScript PC ===
LocoScript PC, later known as LocoScript PC Easy, was the first version of LocoScript to be incompatible with the Amstrad PCW, instead targeting IBM-compatible PCs running MS-DOS 3.0 and above. Released in 1990, the program's feature set was largely inline with LocoScript 2, supporting LocoSpell, LocoMail, and LocoFile, while also adding a few new features, such as support for mixing text with different fonts and new text styling options, as well as a substantially increased range of compatible third-party printers.

=== LocoScript Professional ===
Released in May 1992, LocoScript Professional, or simply Script, was the second major release of LocoScript to run on MS-DOS and included a number of new features and improvements over LocoScript PC.

It supported printers that connected using the then-standard parallel port, such as most HP DeskJets and some Brother HL-series Laser printers (which could be run under DOS using the generic LaserJet4 driver). It did not support printers which required a USB connection or which were labelled "Windows only".

Some issues exist as to its compatibility with Windows XP, Vista, 7, 8, and 10 (when run on those systems' DOS mode or using the DOSBox emulator). For example, it loses WYSIWYG functionality. However, version 2.51 can be tweaked to work in Windows 10 under DOSbox MB6 {Set in LocoScript by selecting F9-Settings-F5-ScreenMode-Text Screen Direct-OK F10} (DOSBox MB6 maintains printing via the parallel printer port, running in text screen mode).

=== LocoScript 3 ===
LocoScript 3 included the ability to print text at any size using scalable "LX" fonts, and to use multiple fonts in a document. According to the vendor, LocoScript 3 also had the ability to include pictures and draw boxes within documents, a facility to print odd-numbered and even-numbered pages separately, and a word counter. The vendor recommended LocoScript 3 only for use with PCW models that had 512 KB of RAM.

Four add-on utilities were included: LocoSpell (a spell checker), LocoMail (a mail merge program), LocoFile (a database program), and a Printer Support Pack, but (unlike in the earlier LocoScript versions) these utilities were no longer sold separately.

=== LocoScript 4 ===
The last major version of LocoScript for the PCW, LocoScript 4, was released in 1996 by LocoScript Software, a new company created by former Locomotive Software employees after the sale of Locomotive to Demon Internet. It added a wider range of fonts, support for colour printing, a label-printing facility, and optional support for hundreds of printers. Version 4 also supported the mail merge program, LocoMail, and the LocoFile database program.

== See also ==
- Amstrad CP/M Plus character set
