= Amstrad CP/M Plus character set =

Group of 8-bit character sets introduced by Amstrad/Locomotive Software

- Alias(es): PCW character set, ZX Spectrum +3 character set
- Languages: US English, French, German, UK English, Danish Swedish, Italian and Spanish
- Created by: Amstrad, Locomotive Software
- Based on: ISO/IEC 646
- Other related encoding: LocoScript

The Amstrad CP/M Plus character set (alternatively known as PCW character set or ZX Spectrum +3 character set) is any of a group of 8-bit character sets introduced by Amstrad/Locomotive Software for use in conjunction with their adaptation of Digital Research's CP/M Plus on various Amstrad CPC / Schneider CPC and Amstrad PCW / Schneider Joyce machines. The character set was also used on the Amstrad ZX Spectrum +3 version of CP/M.

At least on the ZX Spectrum +3 it existed in eight language-specific variants (based on ISO/IEC 646) depending on the selected locale of the system: USA (default), France, Germany, UK, Denmark, Sweden, Italy and Spain.

Another slight variant of the character set was used by LocoScript.

== Character set ==
Amstrad CP/M Plus character set (Language 0)
	0	1	2	3	4	5	6	7	8	9	A	B	C	D	E	F
0x	∞	⊙	Γ	Δ	⊗	×	÷	∴	Π	↓	Σ	←	→	±	↔	Ω
1x	α	β	γ	δ	ε	θ	λ	μ	π	ρ	σ	τ	φ	χ	ψ	ω
2x	SP	!	"	#	$	%	&	'	(	)	*	+	,	-	.	/
3x	0︀ (Note: Code point 0x30 is intended for zero with a slash (Unicode standardized variant U+0030 U+FE00), 0x7F for zero without a slash. Both can be expressed as Unicode character U+0030, but of course if both are converted to the same code point the conversion is non-reversible.)	1	2	3	4	5	6	7	8	9	:	;	<	=	>	?
4x	@	A	B	C	D	E	F	G	H	I	J	K	L	M	N	O
5x	P	Q	R	S	T	U	V	W	X	Y	Z	[	\	]	↑	_
6x	`	a	b	c	d	e	f	g	h	i	j	k	l	m	n	o
7x	p	q	r	s	t	u	v	w	x	y	z	{	|	}	~	0
8x	◾︎	╧	╟	╚	╤	║	╔	╠	╢	╝	═	╩	╗	╣	╦	╬
9x	·	╵	╶	└	╷	│	┌	├	╴	┘	─	┴	┐	┤	┬	┼
Ax	ª	º	°	£	©	¶	§	†	¼	½	¾	«	»	₧	¿	¡
Bx	ƒ	¢	¨	´	ˆ	‰	⅛	⅜	⅝	⅞	ß	○	•	¥	®	™
Cx	Á	É	Í	Ó	Ú	Â	Ê	Î	Ô	Û	À	È	Ì	Ò	Ù	Ÿ
Dx	Ä	Ë	Ï	Ö	Ü	Ç	Æ	Å	Ø	Ñ	Ã	Õ	≥	≤	≠	≃
Ex	á	é	í	ó	ú	â	ê	î	ô	û	à	è	ì	ò	ù	ÿ
Fx	ä	ë	ï	ö	ü	ç	æ	å	ø	ñ	ã	õ	⇒	⇐	⇔	≡

Language variants

== Language variants ==
In languages 1 to 7, certain characters in the range 0..127 are swapped with characters in the range 128..255 of the character set, as shown in the following table:

Language	0x23	0x40	0x5B	0x5C	0x5D	0x5E	0x60	0x7B	0x7C	0x7D	0x7E
0: USA	#	@	[	\	]	^	`	{	|	}	~
1: France	#	à	º	ç	§	^	`	é	ù	è	¨
2: Germany	#	§	Ä	Ö	Ü	^	`	ä	ö	ü	ß
3: UK	£	@	[	\	]	^	`	{	|	}	~
4: Denmark	#	@	Æ	Ø	Å	^	`	æ	ø	å	~
5: Sweden	#	É	Ä	Ö	Å	Ü	é	ä	ö	å	ü
6: Italy	#	@	º	\	é	^	ù	à	ò	è	ì
7: Spain	Pt	@	¡	Ñ	¿	^	`	¨	ñ	}	~

== See also ==
- Amstrad CPC character set
- ZX Spectrum character set
- ISO/IEC 646 (similar, but not identical set of 7-bit character sets)
- Box-drawing character
