= Amstrad CPC character set =

Jeu de caractère

The Amstrad CPC character set (alternatively known as the BASIC graphics character set) is the character set used in the Amstrad CPC series of 8-bit personal computers when running BASIC (the default mode, until it boots into CP/M). This character set existed in the built-in "lower" ROM chip. It is based on ASCII-1967, with the exception of character 0x5E which is the up arrow instead of the circumflex, as it is in ASCII-1963, a feature shared with other character sets of the time. Apart from the standard printable ASCII range (0x20-0x7e), it is completely different from the Amstrad CP/M Plus character set. The BASIC character set had symbols of particular use in games and home computing, while the CP/M Plus character reflected the International and Business flavor of the CP/M Plus environment. This character set is represented in Unicode (excluding 0xEF, 0xFC, and 0xFD) as of the March 2020 release of Unicode 13.0, which added symbols for legacy computing. The three missing characters have however been accepted for inclusion in Unicode 16.0 in the symbols for legacy computing supplement.

== Character set ==
The character bitmaps of the Amstrad CPC character set.

Amstrad CPC (Note: The control characters normally do not produce a character on screen, but are interpreted as control codes. When using the character 1 (SOH) as a prefix, or with the graphics text, or entered from the keyboard, they are displayed with the representation on the bottom of the cell.)
	0	1	2	3	4	5	6	7	8	9	A	B	C	D	E	F
0x	◻	⎾	⏊	⏌	⚡︎	⊠	✓	⍾	←	→	↓	↑	↡	↲	⊗	⊙
1x	⊟	◷	◶	◵	◴	⍻	⎍	⊣	⧖	⍿	␦	⊖	◰	◱	◲	◳
2x	SP	!	"	#	$	%	&	’	(	)	*	+	,	-	.	/
3x	0	1	2	3	4	5	6	7	8	9	:	;	<	=	>	?
4x	@	A	B	C	D	E	F	G	H	I	J	K	L	M	N	O
5x	P	Q	R	S	T	U	V	W	X	Y	Z	[	\	]	↑	_
6x	`	a	b	c	d	e	f	g	h	i	j	k	l	m	n	o
7x	p	q	r	s	t	u	v	w	x	y	z	{	|	}	~	DEL
8x		▘	▝	▀	▖	▌	▞	▛	▗	▚	▐	▜	▄	▙	▟	█
9x	·	╵	╶	└	╷	│	┌	├	╴	┘	─	┴	┐	┤	┬	┼
Ax		´	¨	£	©	¶	§	‘	¼	½	¾	±	÷	¬	¿	¡
Bx	α	β	γ	δ	ε	θ	λ	μ	π	σ	φ	ψ	χ	ω	Σ	Ω
Cx	🮠	🮡	🮣	🮢	🮧	🮥	🮦	🮤	🮨	🮩	🮮	╳	╱	╲	🮕	▒
Dx	▔	▕	▁	▏	◤	◥	◢	◣	🮎	🮍	🮏	🮌	🮜	🮝	🮞	🮟
Ex	☺	☹	♣	♦	♥	♠	○	●	□	■	♂	♀	♩	♪	☼	
Fx	⭡	⭣	⭠	⭢	▲	▼	▶	◀	🯆	🯅	🯇	🯈			⭥	⭤

Included in Symbols for Legacy Computing Supplement, introduced with Unicode 16.0

== Control characters ==
Each of the characters in the C0 character range (0x00-0x1F) had a special function.

BASIC Control characters
Value (hex)	Value(dec)	Name	Parameter	Locomotive BASIC equivalent	Function
00	0	NUL			No effect. Ignored.
01	1	SOH	0-255		Print the symbol given by the parameter value. This allows the symbols in the range 0 to 31 to be displayed.
02	2	STX		CURSOR 0	Turn off text cursor.
03	3	ETX		CURSOR 1	Turn on text cursor.
04	4	EOT	0-2	MODE	Set screen mode.
05	5	ENQ	0-255		Send the parameter character to the graphics cursor.
06	6	ACK			Enable Text Screen (see NAK)
07	7	BEL			Sound Bleeper. Note that this flushes the sound queues.
08	8	BS			Move cursor back one character. (Note: The codes marked force the cursor to a legal position in the current window before they are obeyed - but may leave the cursor in an illegal position)
09	9	TAB			Move cursor forward one character.
0A	10	LF			Move cursor down one line.
0B	11	VT			Move cursor up one line.
0C	12	FF		CLS	Clear text window and move cursor to top left corner.
0D	13	CR			Move cursor to left edge of window on current line.
0E	14	SO	0-15	PAPER	Set Paper Ink.
0F	15	SI	0-15	PEN	Set Pen Ink.
10	16	DLE			Delete current character.
11	17	DC1			Clear from left edge of window to, and including, the current character position.
12	18	DC2			Clear from, and including, the current character position to the right edge of window.
13	19	DC3			Clear from start of window to, and including, the current character position.
14	20	DC4			Clear from, and including, the current character position to the end of window.
15	21	NAK			Turn off text screen. The screen will not react to anything sent to it until after an ACK is sent.
16	22	SYN	0-1		Set transparency (0 disables, 1 enables)
17	23	ETB	0-3		Set graphics ink mode. 0 normal (overwrite), 1 XOR, 2 AND, 3 OR
18	24	CAN			Exchange Pen and Paper Inks, effectively applying the reverse video effect.
19	25	EM	0-255 (9 times)	SYMBOL	Set the matrix for user definable character. The first parameter specifies which character's matrix to set. The next eight specify the matrix.
1A	26	SUB	1-80, 1-80, 1-25, 1-25	WINDOW	Set Window. The parameters specify left, right, top and bottom edges of the window.
1B	27	ESC			No effect. Ignored.
1C	28	FS	0-15, 0-31, 0-31	INK	Set Ink to a pair of colors. The first parameter specifies the Ink, the next two the required colors. (Note: Parameter values 27 to 31 are un-defined colors.)
1D	29	GS	0-31, 0-31	BORDER	Set Border to a pair of colors. Equivalent to a BORDER command. The two parameters specify the two colors.
1E	30	RS			Move cursor to top left hand corner of window.
1F	31	US	1-80, 1-25	LOCATE	Move cursor to the given position in the current window. The first parameter gives the column to move to, the second gives the line.
