= Meltdown (1986 video game) =

- Publisher: Alligata
- Designer: Ross Goodley
- Platform: Amstrad CPC
- Release: 1986
- Genre: Action-adventure
- Mode: Single-player

Meltdown is an isometric action-adventure game for the Amstrad CPC published by Alligata in 1986. There are two versions: a 64k version with basic speech synthesis and a 128k version featuring much more speech synthesis. A version was also released in French called Le Syndrome.

== Gameplay ==
The player has to navigate three mazes from the 1st floor down to the 3rd floor of a nuclear reactor to prevent a nuclear meltdown. There are eight computer terminals on each floor, the first allowing access to previous floors. Six of the terminals provide access to a different game within a game which the player must win in order to get a password. Once all six passwords have been retrieved the eighth computer allows the player access to an end-of-level game which the player must complete before being allowed access to the next floor. Altogether there are 24 games (three isometric mazes, 18 sub-games and three end-of-level games) which must be completed to win the whole game. The final game is a text-input only robot system for adjusting the control rods of the reactor so it won't explode.

== Reception ==
Reception

Review scores
Publication	Score
Amstrad Action	67%
Your Computer	5/5

Your Computer characterized the game as "outstanding", highlighting its "excellent animation" and found it to make the most of the capabilities of the Amstrad. Amstrad Action assessed the game as a "good package" with "plenty of depth", highlighting its variety of levels, but found the game "lacked polish", citing the "very disappointing" graphics and "appalling" minigames.

== See also ==
- Scram
