= AMSDOS =

- Developer: Locomotive Software
- OS family: Disk operating systems
- Working state: Discontinued
- Source model: Closed source
- Initial release: 1984; 41 years ago
- Default user interface: None, access through BASIC and firmware calls

AMSDOS is a disk operating system for the 8-bit Amstrad CPC Computer (and various clones). The name is a contraction of Amstrad Disk Operating System.

AMSDOS first appeared in 1984 on the CPC 464, with added 3 inch disk drive, and then on the CPC 664 and CPC 6128. Relatively fast and efficient for its time, AMSDOS was quicker and more effective than most of its contemporaries.

AMSDOS was provided built into ROM (either supplied with the external disk drive or in the machine ROM, depending on model) and was accessible through the built-in Locomotive BASIC as well as through firmware routines. Its main function was to map the cassette access routines (which were built into every CPC model) through to a disk drive. This enabled the majority of cassette-based programs to work with a disk drive with no modification. AMSDOS was able to support up to two connected disk drives.

== Commands ==
AMDOS extends the AMSTRAD BASIC by the addition of a number of external commands which are identified by a preceding ¦ (bar) symbol. The following is a list of external commands supported by AMSDOS.

- ¦A
- ¦B
- ¦CPM
- ¦DIR
- ¦DISC
- ¦DISC.IN
- ¦DISC.OUT
- ¦DRIVE
- ¦ERA
- ¦REN
- ¦TAPE
- ¦TAPE.IN
- ¦TAPE.OUT
- ¦USER

== Alternatives ==
Other disk operating systems for the Amstrad range included CP/M (which was also bundled with an external disk drive, or built-in on ROM depending on model), RAMDOS, which allowed the full (800K) capacity of single-density 3 ½" disks to be used providing a suitable drive was connected and SymbOS.
