= Amstrad CPC 464 =

1984 home computer

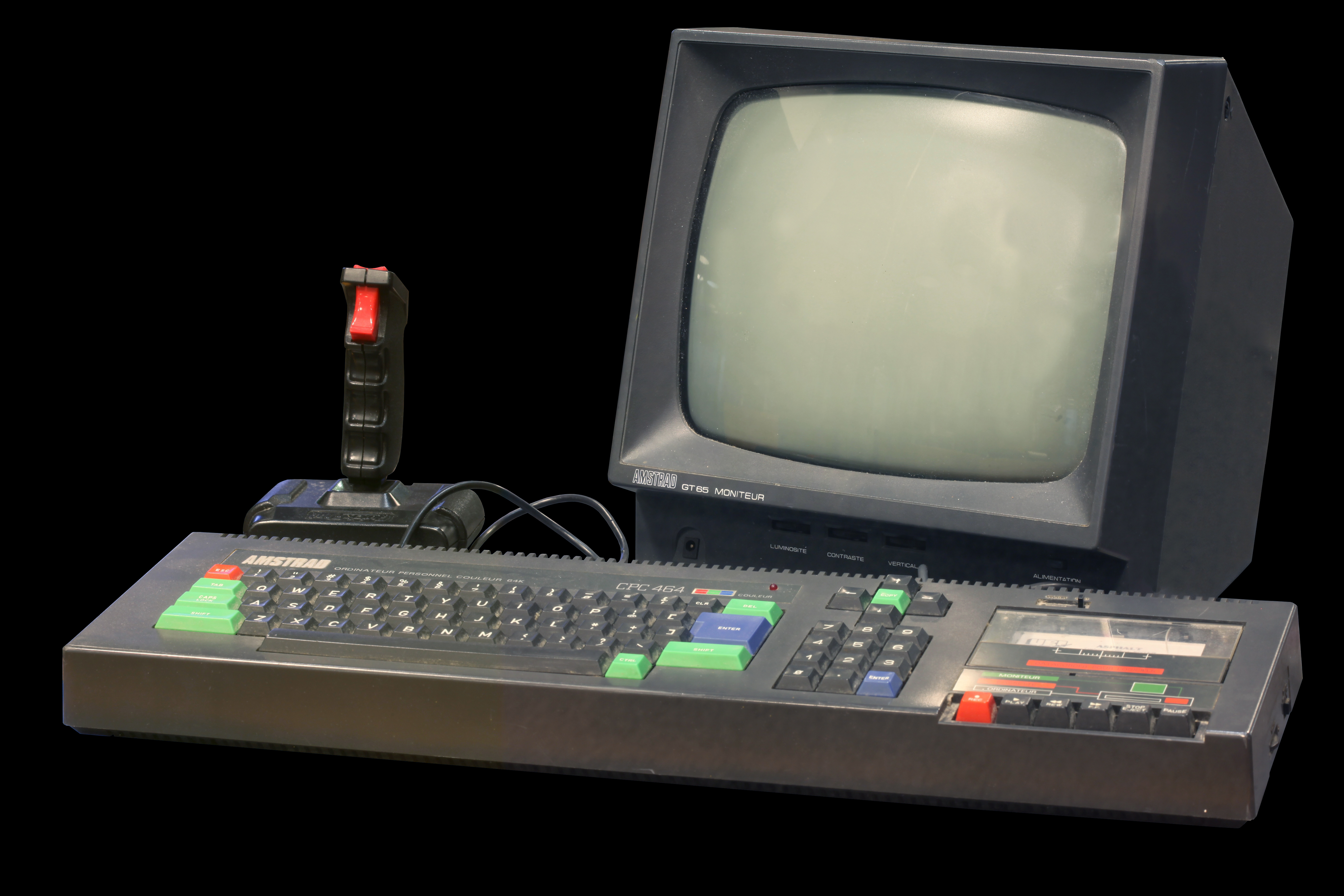
- CPC 464 with Joystick
- Also known as: CPC 464
- Developer: Amstrad
- Product family: Amstrad CPC
- Type: Personal Computer
- Released: 21 June 1984
- Introductory price: £199 (with green monitor), £299 (with colour monitor)
- Units sold: 2 million
- Operating system: AMSDOS
- CPU: Zilog Z80 @ 4 MHz
- Memory: 64 KB
- Display: Colour or green monochrome monitor
- Graphics: Motorola 6845 or compatible with a custom-designed gate array (160×200, 16 colours; 320×200, 4 colours; 640x200, 2 colours)
- Sound: General Instrument AY-3-8912
- Best-selling game: The Guild of Thieves
- Related: Amstrad CPC

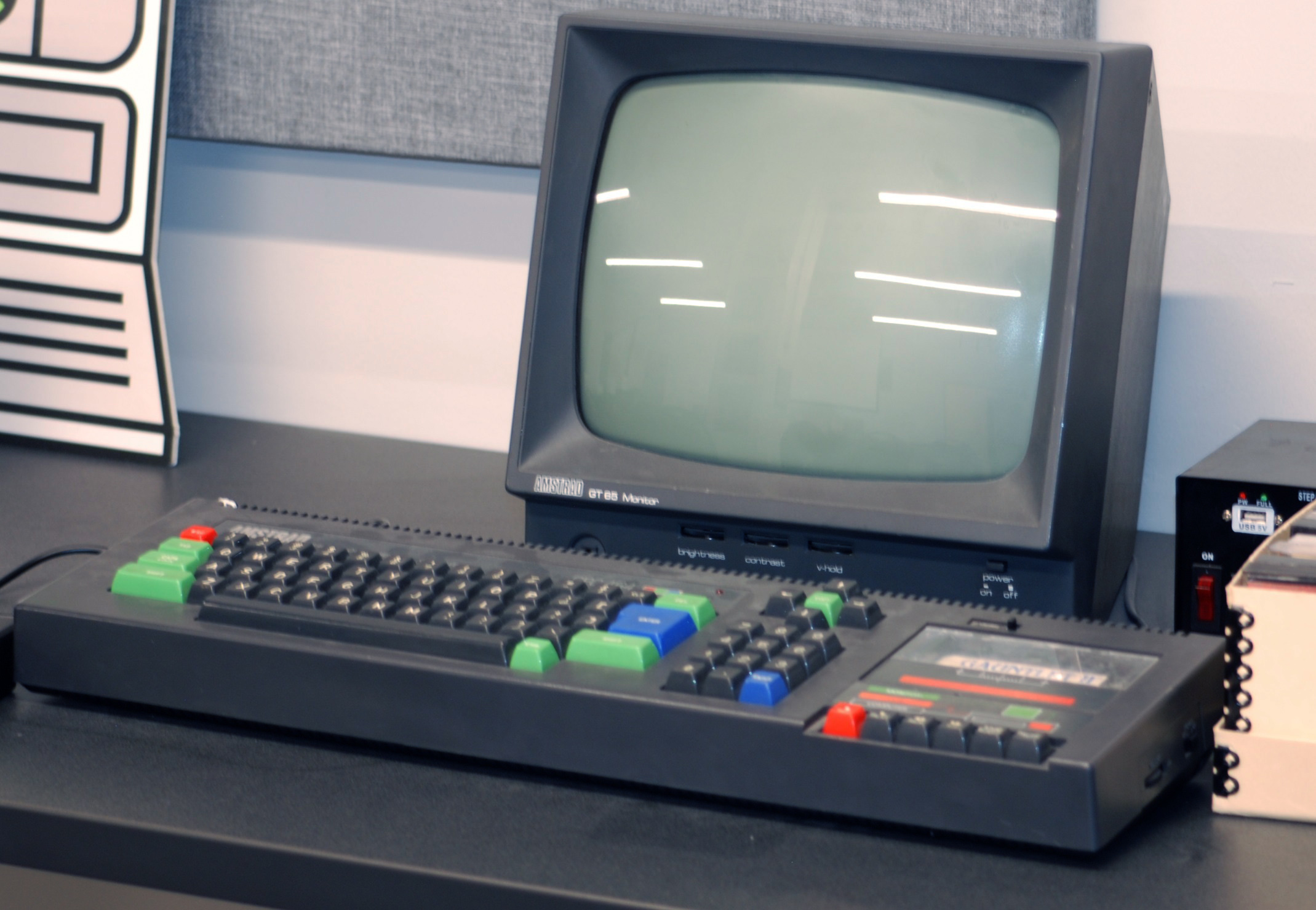
Amstrad CPC 464 on display at the Living Computer Museum, complete with games for public use

The CPC 464 is the first personal home computer built by Amstrad. Released in 1984, it was the first entry in the Amstrad CPC family of home computers. The CPC 464 was one of the bestselling and best produced microcomputers, with more than 2 million units sold in Europe. The British home computer boom had already peaked before Amstrad announced the CPC 464 (which stood for Colour Personal Computer) which they then released a mere nine months later.

Amstrad was known for cheap hi-fi products but had not broken into the home computer market until the CPC 464. Their consumer electronic sales were starting to plateau and owner and founder Alan Sugar stated "We needed to move on and find another sector or product to bring us back to profit growth". Work started on the Amstrad home computer in 1983 with engineer Ivor Spital who concluded that Amstrad should enter the home computer market, offering a product that integrated low-cost hardware to be sold at an affordable "impulse-purchase price".

Spital wanted to offer a device that would not commandeer the family TV but instead be an all-in-one computer with its own monitor, thus freeing up the TV and allowing others to play video games at the same time.

Bill Poel, General Manager of Amsoft (Amstrad's software division), said during the launch press release that if the computers were not on the shelves by the end of June, "I will be prepared to sit down and eat one in Trafalgar Square."

== Technical specifications ==
The CPC 464 is powered by the Zilog Z80 processor after the original attempts to use the 6502 processor, being used in the Apple II amongst many other 8-bit computer families, failed. The Z80 runs at 4 MHz, has 64 KB of memory and runs AMSDOS, Amstrad's own OS. The unit includes a built-in tape drive and the choice of a colour or green monochrome monitor.

The graphics, which uses a Motorola 6845 chip for timing and address generation, provides 3 standard display modes, each using colours chosen from a palette of 27.

- Mode 0 - 160×200, 16 colours
- Mode 1 - 320×200, 4 colours
- Mode 2 - 640x200, 2 colours

Its sound is supplied using the General Instrument AY-3-8912 sound chip that provides 3-voice, 8-octave sound capacity through a built-in loudspeaker with volume control. Later versions of the 464 have a headphone jack that can also be used for external speakers.

The CPC 464's code name during development was 'Arnold'.

== Reception ==
The 464 was popular with consumers for various reasons. Aside from the joystick port, the computer, keyboard, and tape deck were all combined into one unit that attached to the monitor via two cables. The monitor also contained the power supply unit which powered the whole unit via one wall plug. It did not have very many wires and was simple enough for even the most inexperienced user to install.
