= Locomotive Software =

Locomotive Software was a small British software house that did most of its development for Amstrad's home and small business computers of the 1980s. It was founded by Richard Clayton and Chris Hall on 14 February 1983.

It wrote or contributed significantly to the ROMs of the Amstrad CPC 464, Amstrad CPC 664 and Amstrad CPC 6128 home computers, the Amstrad PCW wordprocessor and the later Amstrad-manufactured ZX Spectrum +2A, +2B and +3 machines, amongst others. Its Locomotive BASIC for the CPC range was a fast and highly featured implementation of BASIC for the time and later led to the development of Mallard BASIC for Amstrad's CP/M+ machines. Locomotive was also responsible for the ports of the CP/M operating system to Amstrad machines — initially 2.2 for the CPC 464 and CPC 664 and later CP/M 3.0 ("CP/M+") for the CPC 6128, PCW range and Spectrum +3.

A later Locomotive BASIC was BASIC2 for Digital Research's GEM graphical user interface, as supplied with the Amstrad PC1512 and PC1640 range of PC clones.

The company also developed the LocoScript word processor for the PCW, which was a complete bootable environment in its own right with no separate underlying operating system. The company later produced a PC version of this software, but it was not very successful, partly because it was a DOS application, just as the PC market was moving to Microsoft Windows, but also because the program compared poorly to incumbents like WordPerfect in the more competitive environment of PC word processors.

The same team later went on to develop the Turnpike Internet client for Windows, which was for many years distributed as the standard access software by pioneering dial-up Internet access provider Demon Internet. Demon Internet later acquired Locomotive Software.
