= Monster Max =

1994 video game

- Developer: Rare
- Publisher: Titus France
- Designer: Jon Ritman
- Programmer: Jon Ritman
- Artist: Bernie Drummond
- Composer: David Wise
- Platform: Game Boy
- Release: UK: August 1994; FRA: September 1994
- Genres: Action-adventure, puzzle
- Mode: Single-player

Monster Max is a 1994 action-adventure puzzle video game developed by Rare and published by Titus France in Europe for the Game Boy. The player is the titular aspiring rock star, who, in an attempt to fight King Krond who bans all music, traverses nine floors of the Mega Hero Academy. Floors consist of diversely-designed rooms of puzzles to solve, the player having to figure out the order of actions to take.

The game was specifically developed by a three-member team, which consisted of Jon Ritman for programming and design, Bernie Drummond for graphics, and David Wise for music. Ritman and Drummond, before joining Rare, developed isometric games for Ocean Software, including Batman (1986) and Head over Heels (1987). As a result of the failure of an arcade football game to be completed for the company, Ritman and Drummond did not have any publicity with their work for seven years. Ritman decided to work on an isometric Game Boy title with a £1,200 Global Language Assembler Monitor software development kit he created by himself, noticing the handheld console's absence of the genre.

Production lasted nine months and ended in January 1993. It was complicated by quirks and complexities of the Game Boy's hardware, such as low resolution, constant memory paging and the differences in character encoding between the bottom third and top two thirds of the screen. Ritman and Drummond borrowed some concepts from their earlier isometric games while adding new aspects to the genre, including bigger room sizes and the inclusion of floors with different themes and room design.

Despite a delay in release that negatively impacted sales, Monster Max was critically acclaimed, its quality being compared to The Legend of Zelda: Link's Awakening (1993). Core praises were its ability to hold huge levels, several rooms, and high graphical detail on a Game Boy cartridge, and the variety and challenge from the design of the rooms. It was one of three Game Boy entries in 1001 Video Games You Must Play Before You Die (2010), where it was called a "mini-masterpiece" with the best puzzles of any isometric game.

== Gameplay ==
The isometric game's training level Play Pen

Monster Max is an isometric action-adventure puzzle video game that can be played in one of five language choices and two directional pad setups. The player is the titular aspiring rock star, who traverses nine floors of the Mega Hero Academy to overthrow the tyrannical King Krond, who resides on the tenth floor and bans all music performance in his land. The first floor has a training level, named the Play Pen. In each floor, Monster Max performs two-to-three tasks of which the reward is gold, which is used to purchase the elevator that takes him to the next floor. Tasks include eliminating enemies and collecting objects like journals, safes, crowns, and torches. On the tenth floor, there is only one mission to complete before the Krond showdown: to collect four objects. Each room has a computer terminal informing the player the mission in the next room, although the current mission details can also be accessed in the pause menu.

The rooms consist of blocks that can be re-positioned, and are varied in design, featuring various objects and obstacles. Some of the game's foes include parrots, robots, and mummies. The goal is to figure out the order of actions, such as moving blocks and turning off switches for boilers and electricity, to take in each room. The rooms initially only require figuring out where to move blocks, but more elements to solve per room are encountered as the game progresses. Missions can be exited and returned to with a password system.

Collectible objects can be held two-at-a-time, and their function is explained in the pause menu. These include a bag that can hold one block at a time (although can not be used to move blocks into other rooms), and a map indication the player's current location and progress. Three objects give Max maneuver abilities: a bolt of lightning that increases walking speed, a duck that allows him to squat into smalls areas, and boots that enable him to jump. There are also weapons for Max to collect, including a sword, mines that eliminate enemies and blocks, a Super Spell that shoots a ball, and stars and energy fields that temporarily protect Max from enemy damage. The energy field prohibits Max from walking and shooting while activated. Also collectable are extra lives, of which Max begins with four.

== Development ==
=== Background and origins ===
Monster Max was designed and programmed by Jon Ritman with graphics by Bernie Drummond, both having established themselves in the video games industry by developing isometric 8-bit video games for Ocean Software, including Batman (1986) and Head over Heels (1987). Following Match Day II (1987), Ritman and Drummond moved to Rare, owned by the founders of Ultimate Play the Game, the developer and publisher of what launched the isometric game trend, Knight Lore (1984). Choosing to work for the company as an answer to an advertisement in Crash, and with respect for Ultimate, the two had their first project be an arcade football game named Final Whistle.

Although the software's design, visuals and code was finished in six months, the arcade cabinet was such a "time consumer" its hardware and graphics had to be re-done in another six months. Rare cancelled Final Whistle out of a perception of a lack of instant appeal to its target demographic. This led to a seven-year gap where the two were not public to the press and did not have work released. Ritman, after completing his own software development kit using a £1,200 Global Language Assembler Monitor (GLAM) that was used in other Rare games, wanted to develop a Game Boy product with it. His reasoning was how short the development process would be for a complete game on a hand-held device. He chose an isometric game, noticing that the genre was absent in the console's library, but possible given its inclusion of a Zilog Z80-like chip and more memory than the ZX Spectrum. Monster Max was the first isometric Game Boy game. When Ritman called Drummond about a potential Game Boy project, the artist's latest drawing was a half-reptilian/half-skeleton guitarist that became the titular playable character.

=== Production ===
Monster Max was produced in nine months with the GLAM development kit, ending in January 1993. In addition to Ritman and Drummond, David Wise was the composer. Ritman recalled the process as phoning him for music and sound effects and Wise sending them in return.

At the start of production, Ritman learned the technical complexities of the Game Boy to create the engine before designing and programming began. Ritman described the Game Boy's chip as a "castrated Z80", where "two-thirds of the registers had gone AWOL as had the 16-bit maths instructions, and that made even the simplest of programs very hard work indeed." The chip did not have the ease of conversion to other consoles the actual Z80 had, making the project Game Boy-exclusive.

Aspects of the Game Boy's memory complicated the coding and design, such as low resolution, constant memory paging and the differences in character encoding between the bottom third and top two thirds of the screen. The hardware limitations also meant keeping the detail of isometric graphics while the screen scrolled was impossible. The development kit was on the Nintendo Entertainment System, which the controller's directional pad was more prone to accidental direction switches than the same of the Game Boy. Thus, an alternative control option for the NES controller was added for testing. The lack of other play testers was another reason Monster Max's development differed from that of Ritman's other isometric games.

Ritman conceived the structure of most rooms spontaneously and during programming. In rare instances, such as rooms with multiple cases, the levels were planned and pencil-drawn on paper. Drummond had a similar process, drawing "whatever looked good" for Ritman to create a narrative out of. For communication purposes, the two categorized the size of blocks under terms like "blocks" and "sweets." Although there are three levels within a floor, Ritman chose to only require the player to complete two. This was inspired by the players he noticed not advancing very far into Batman, and the desire to give the player more choice: "it's good to say there's an alternative." This and a password system came out of Ritman's thought process of designing a game for a mobile device. The final cartridge packs twice the memory of Head Over Heels: two megabytes, one for the 630 rooms, and another for menus, text data for five languages, and an advert for an unreleased Titus game, Blues Brothers Pinball.

Commodore 64 and Amstrad CPC versions of Ritman and Drummond's previous work were referenced, and some concepts were borrowed, easing the development process. For example, the concept of pockets to hold objects was taken from Batman. The Game Boy's increased memory allowed Ritman to improve upon the genre, with larger rooms and floors with different themes and room designs. In a departure from Ritman's previous titles, Monster Max limited its collectible abilities to two at a time, to match the number of buttons on the Game Boy. This design decision also pressured him to focus on the order of rooms to avoid situations where the player accidentally drops an item in an area he can not return to.

The "working sprite" for Monster Max was "Prehistoric Jon", which was Ritman wearing a loin-cloth. For the Nintendo Seal of Approval, Ritman recorded a six-hour gameplay session, played on a NES. In a situation rare in his career due to his attention to detail to problems, he was required to fix a bug that occurred in the seventh level, where an icon flashed on screen for around three seconds. The name for the "Deadly Spell" was changed to "Magic Spell". Another six-hour playthrough had to be filmed with the problems fixed. According to Ritman, an unspecified Titus France staff member wanted to "change every single exploding block" following completion, but "considering there are over a thousand blocks, it was out of the question."

== Release ==
Titus France published Monster Max in the UK in August 1994, and in France in September 1994. Although never released in North America, American publications still reviewed it with release dates including June 1994 and April 1995; a June 1995 Game Players review claimed the game was in market "now." Ritman explained in a retrospective interview that Titus gave him the opportunity for Monster Max to be officially published by Nintendo if the playable character was from the Mario series (1981–present). He did not remember why he rejected, but suspected it was the potential amount of changes to the graphics Nintendo would have demanded, resulting in an overhaul of the design of the puzzles. He recalled Shigeru Miyamoto's reaction, simply saying, "there are aspects of things he didn't like." Although Monster Max was ostensibly released in late 1994, Titus was very slow in distributing it and copies of the game could not be bought until December 1995. As a result, sales for the game were poor.

== Reception ==
Reception

Review scores
Publication	Score
Consoles +	93%
Computer and Video Games	85/100
Game Players	62%
GamePro	15/20
HobbyConsolas	90/100
Joypad	87%
M! Games	76%
Mega Fun	81%
Official Nintendo Magazine	90/100
Superjuegos	96/100
Total!	90%
Video Games (DE)	81%
Banzzai	94/100
Games World	88/100
GB Action	94%
Nintendo Acción	93/100
Super Gamer	96/100
Super Power	59/100

Upon release, Monster Max was frequently considered one of the best all-time Game Boy titles by critics. Nintendo Acción's Javier Abad and Superjuegos's J.C. Mayerick called it the number-one best of all-time upon release; the latter critic still thought it was in the top-three in his 1997 re-review. Sam of Consoles + called it one of the best action-adventure entries in the Game Boy library. Several critics found it to be the closest in quality to The Legend of Zelda: Link's Awakening (1993) out of most other video games, a preview article from Super Gamer covering it as the biggest Game Boy game since the Zelda game. For critics from Banzzai and GB Action, Monster Max took over Link's Awakening for the best Game Boy title. The game's originality was highlighted, such as in Ulf's review for Mega Fun which attributed it to its "unusual graphics and sophisticated gameplay." Abad was also excited the place for adventure games may open up in the Game Boy library as a result of Monster Max's high quality.

Monster Max was widely praised for its challenge and variety in level design, requiring the player to be skillful and constantly think and motivating weeks of play. Damian of Super Gamer described it as "fiendishly complex yet childishly simple." Oulan Bator praised its gradual progression of difficulty, as well as the options and practical interface of the menu. Reviewers from Nintendo Magazine System (Official Nintendo Magazine) praised the game's balance of dexterity-involved action segments and puzzles. Staff from Super Power wrote that, over and above knowing when to use items and abilities, the player needed to predict if they had the right items for the following rooms, adding to the challenge. However, the magazine's Liikaa Ykistyiskohtia was annoyed by items not being placed in rooms where they were needed.

In addition to Ritman and Brummond's portfolio, reviewers were reminded of other isometric games, from 1980s 8-bit video games like Knight Lore and Alien 8 (1985) to early 1990s console games such as Solstice (1990), Landstalker (1992), and Equinox (1993). Reviewers were amazed by how huge the room quantity, level size and graphical detail was as well as how it was executed with little slowdown, all considered impressive for a Game Boy catridge. GB Action critic Andy Sharp wondered why an isometric game had not been tried on the handheld console before, but excitedly advised more of them.

Nick of Games World, not a fan of isometric puzzle games, suggested Monster Max was "an absorbing game only in small doses with some intriguing little puzzles" for those not into the genre. However, some reviewers still struggled reading distances as a result of the small size. This was a deal breaker for the game's least favorable reviewers, who came from Game Players and Super Power and suggested the high amount of detail combined with the small size made reading distances even more difficult. Damian appreciated touches in the presentation to make the product appealing to a wide audience, such as a blipvert that pops up every time an object is collected.

== Legacy ==
Monster Max was Ritman's last game he coded by himself, before working for companies like Domark and Argonaut Games. It was also the final isometric game collaboration of Ritman and Drummond. It is one of three Game Boy games listed in the book 1001 Video Games You Must Play Before You Die (2010), where editor Tony Mott called it a "mini-masterpiece" with the best puzzles ever in isometric games. He highlighted how much diversity came out of the game's simple concepts, and how much personality was in low-resolution Game Boy graphics. In 2021, it ranked number 95 on Retro Gamer's special edition of 100 Games To Play Before You Die: Nintendo Consoles Edition. In November 1997, in its 60th monthly issue, Nintendo Acción listed Monster Max the 35th best game they had ever reviewed.
