= Match Day =

Match Day may refer to:

- Match Day (series), a football video game franchise
  - Match Day (video game), a football computer game, the first in the series
- Match Day (medicine), the day the United States' National Resident Matching Program announces medical residency placements for medical students
- Matchday programme, a British and Irish sporting tradition
