= Match Day II =

1987 video game

Matchday II
- ZX Spectrum cover art
- Developer: Jon Ritman
- Publisher: Ocean Software
- Platforms: Amstrad CPC, Amstrad PCW, Commodore 64, MSX, ZX Spectrum
- Release: 1987
- Genre: Sports
- Modes: Single-player, multiplayer

Match Day II is a football sports game part of the Match Day series released for the Amstrad CPC, Amstrad PCW, ZX Spectrum, MSX and Commodore 64 platforms. It was created in 1987 by Jon Ritman with graphics by Bernie Drummond and music and sound by Guy Stevens (except for the Commodore version, which was a line-by-line conversion by John Darnell). It is the sequel to 1984's Match Day.

== Gameplay ==
The controls consist of four directions (allowing eight directions including diagonals) and a shot button. Each team has seven players, including goalkeeper and there are league and cup options available.

The game is considered highly addictive due to its difficulty level, the complete control over ball direction, power and elevation (using a Diamond Deflection System), and the importance of tactics and player positioning over the field (barging if necessary), which makes it challenging to break strong defences. It was the first game to use a kickometer.

Some versions of the game play the song "When the Saints Go Marching In" while the players are walking to their initial positions on the field at the beginning of each half.

== Reception ==
Reception

Awards
Publication	Award
Crash	Crash Smash
Sinclair User	SU Classic
Your Sinclair	Megagame
Computer + Video Games	C+VG Hit
Crash	Best sports game

The ZX Spectrum version of the game went to number 2 in the UK sales charts, behind Out Run.

== Related games ==
The game is similar to a previous unpublished game by Jon Ritman, Soccerama. Later, in 1995, Jon Ritman tried to release Match Day III, but the name of the game was changed to Super Match Soccer to avoid any potential legal issues.
