= Match Day (video game) =

1984 video game

- Developers: Jon Ritman; Chris Clarke
- Publisher: Ocean Software
- Platforms: ZX Spectrum, Amstrad CPC, Amstrad PCW, BBC Micro, Commodore 64, MSX
- Release: 1984
- Genre: Sport
- Modes: Single-player, multiplayer

Match Day is a football computer game, published by Ocean Software in 1984 for the ZX Spectrum. It is the first game in the Match Day series, and was the creation of programmer Jon Ritman and Chris Clarke. Versions were later released for the Amstrad CPC and PCW, BBC Micro, Commodore 64 and MSX systems.

== Background ==
Jon Ritman met Chris Clarke, formerly of Crystal Computing, at Artic Computing in 1983 where Clarke was marketing Bear Bovver, Ritman's latest game for the company. They decided on going freelance to produce a football game after discovering that distributors wanted to see a ZX Spectrum game comparable to International Soccer on the Commodore 64. By chance Ritman met David Ward, co-founder of Ocean Software, at a computer show and told him what he was working on. Several months later Ward called Ritman and offered him a £20,000 advance for the game which he accepted immediately. Ocean licensed the theme tune from Match of the Day from the BBC but not the title, naming it Match Day instead.

== Gameplay ==
ZX Spectrum version

This was the first soccer game for the ZX Spectrum where large moving footballers characters could dribble, throw-in, take corners, etc. The game uses modified sprites from a Ritman's previous title Bear Bovver to create an almost isometric, but still ultimately side-on football title.

The game has 8 teams that the player can choose, such as Ritman Rovers, Clarke PR and Ocean United. Players can rename the teams and redefine the team colours.

== Reception ==
Match Day was released in late 1984 and became a best-seller over the Christmas period reaching number 2 in the charts behind Ghostbusters. The BBC micro version ported by Chris Roberts reached the top of the BBC charts in September 1985. Match Day sold over 50,000 copies

In the 1985 Crash awards, it was voted the 3rd best sports game.

== Legacy ==
The sequel, Match Day II was much the same but incorporated several features still used today in most football titles - a deflection system, the ball could bounce off players, which meant headers were possible, twin-player mode, and a shot power system, although it was as easy to accidentally backheel the ball with this system, as it was to hit a powerful shot. The game is also similar to a previously, not published game by Jon Ritman, Soccerama.

Later, in 1995, Jon Ritman tried to release Match Day III, but the name of the game was changed to Super Match Soccer to avoid any potential legal issues.
