= Smith Corona =

American label manufacturing company

- Industry: Typewriters and mechanical calculators (originally), typewriter supplies, thermal transfer labels, and ribbons
- Genre: typewriters, thermal label technology
- Founded: 1886
- Founder: Lyman, Wilbert, Monroe and Hurlburt Smith
- Fate: Multiple bankruptcies, Acquired by private company in 2000 and reinvented as thermal label and ribbon manufacturer
- Headquarters: Cleveland, Ohio (originally Syracuse, New York), United States
- Area served: United States
- Products: Typewriters, thermal transfer labels, thermal transfer ribbons, direct thermal labels
- Website: www.smithcorona.com

Smith Corona is an American manufacturer of thermal labels, direct thermal labels, and thermal ribbons used in warehouses for primarily barcode labels.

Once a large U.S. typewriter and mechanical calculator manufacturer, Smith Corona expanded aggressively during the 1960s to become a broad-based industrial conglomerate with products extending to paints, foods, and paper. The mechanical calculator sector was wiped out in the early 1970s by the production of inexpensive electronic calculators, and the typewriter business collapsed in the mid-1980s due to the digital revolution and PC-based word processing.

Smith Corona adapted by manufacturing word processing typewriters such as the PWP 1400 model. Its competitors were Brother, Olivetti, Silver Seiko, Adler, Olympia and IBM. In late 2010, Smith Corona entered the industrial ribbon and label market.

The company no longer manufactures typewriters or calculators, but does manufacture large quantities of barcode and shipping labels and the thermal ribbons used in thermal transfer printers. Their facility is in Cleveland, Ohio. Smith Corona competes with distributors of Zebra Technologies supplies, packaging companies like Uline, and various other private companies.

== History ==
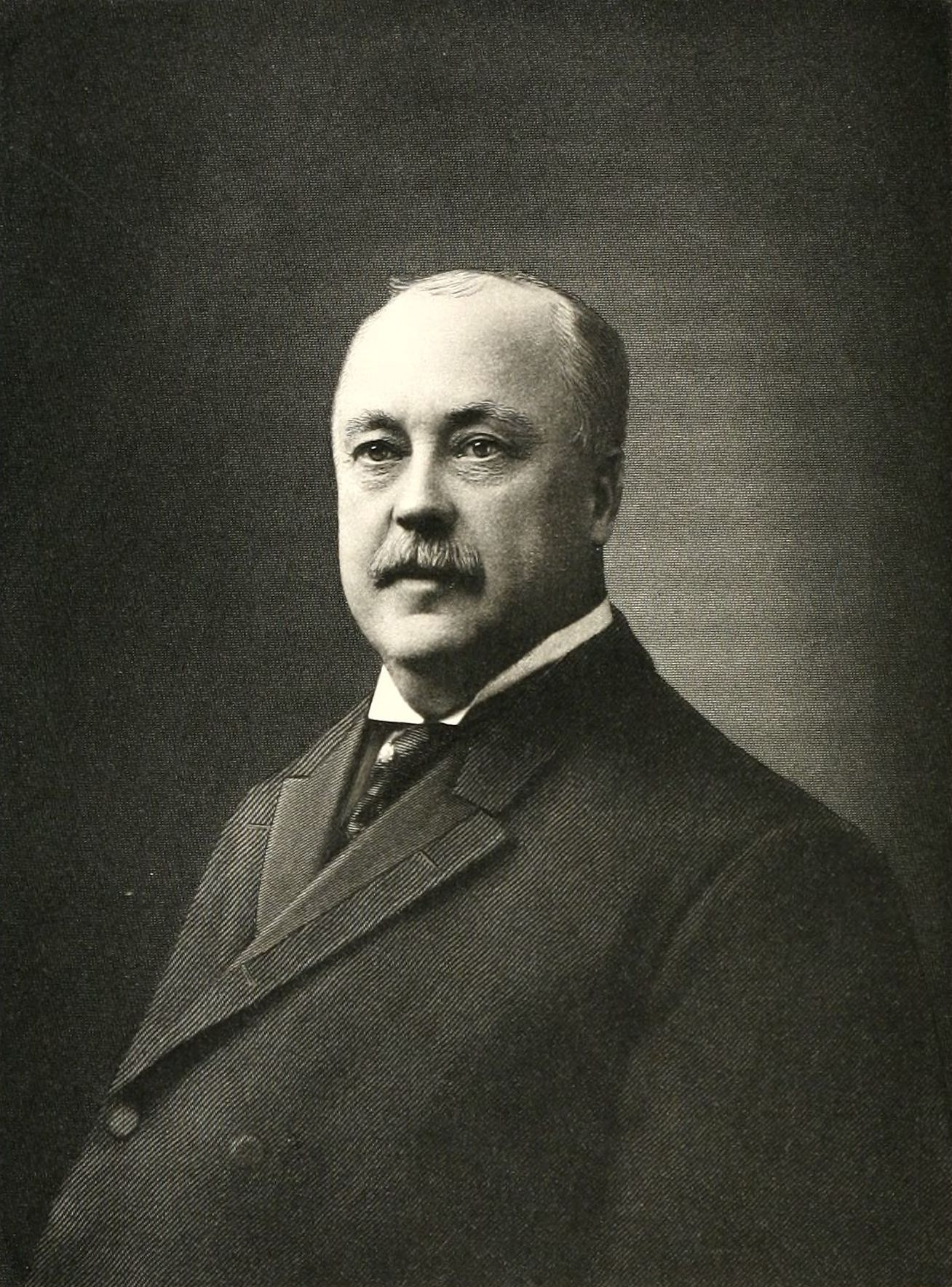
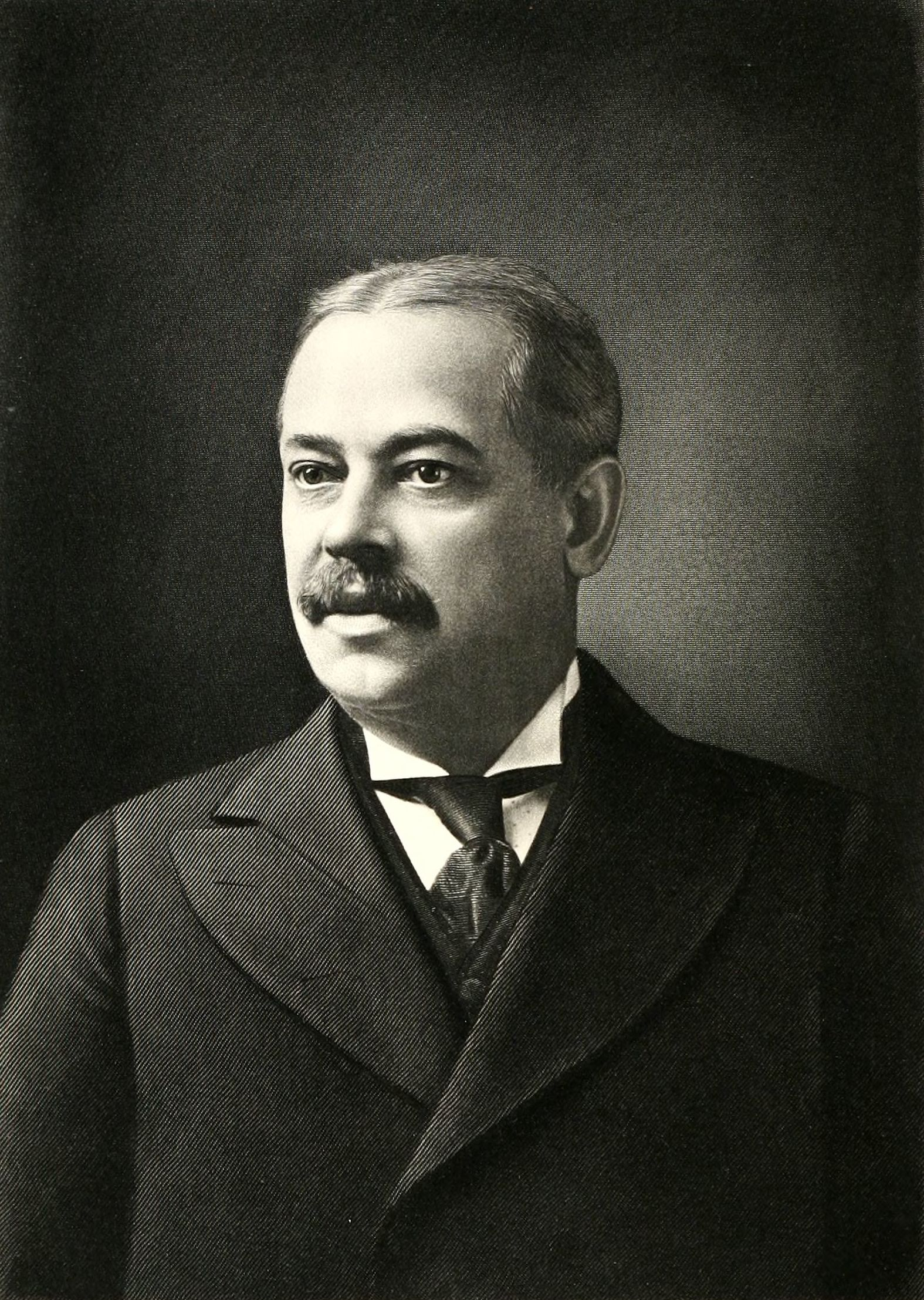
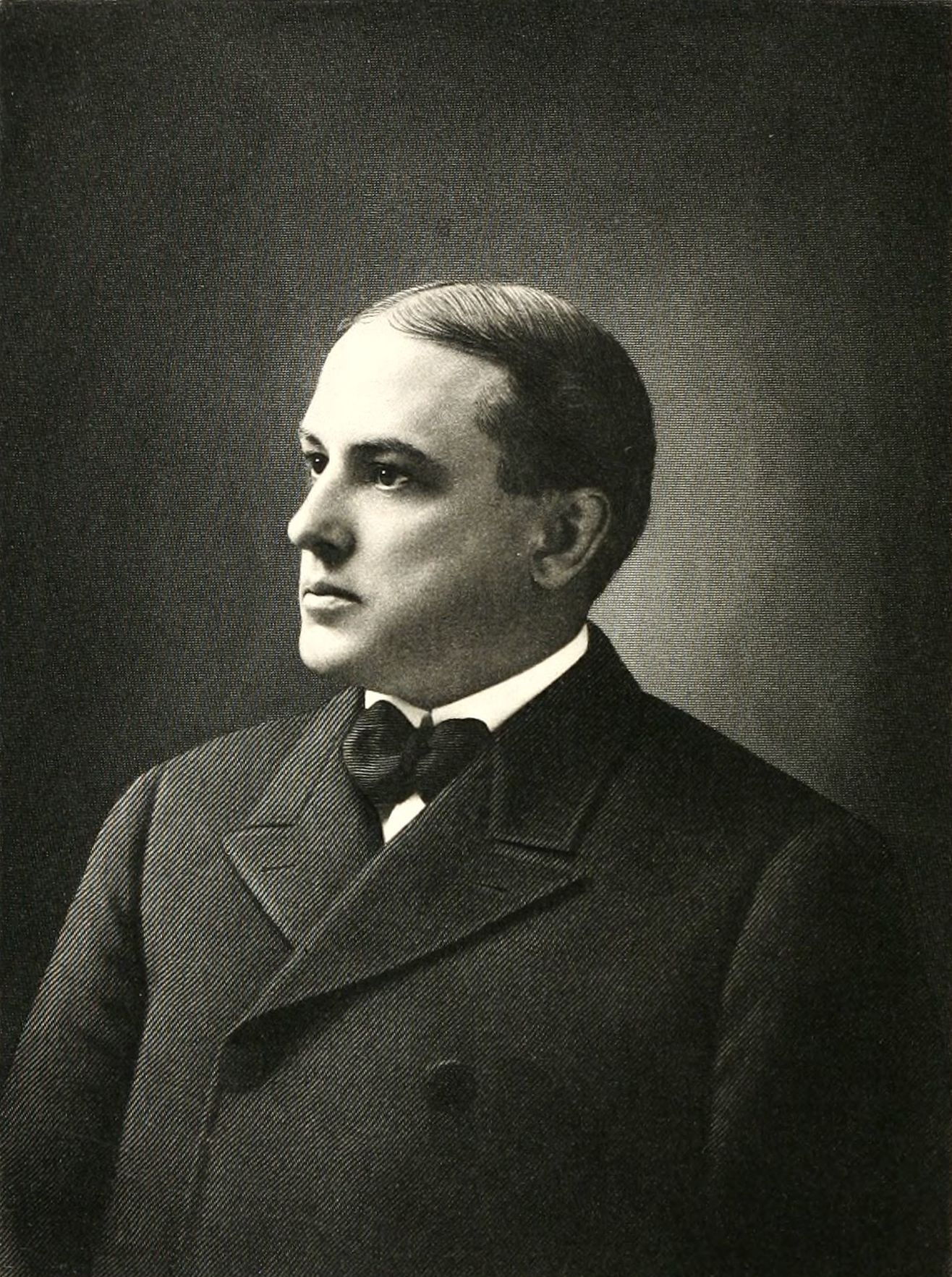
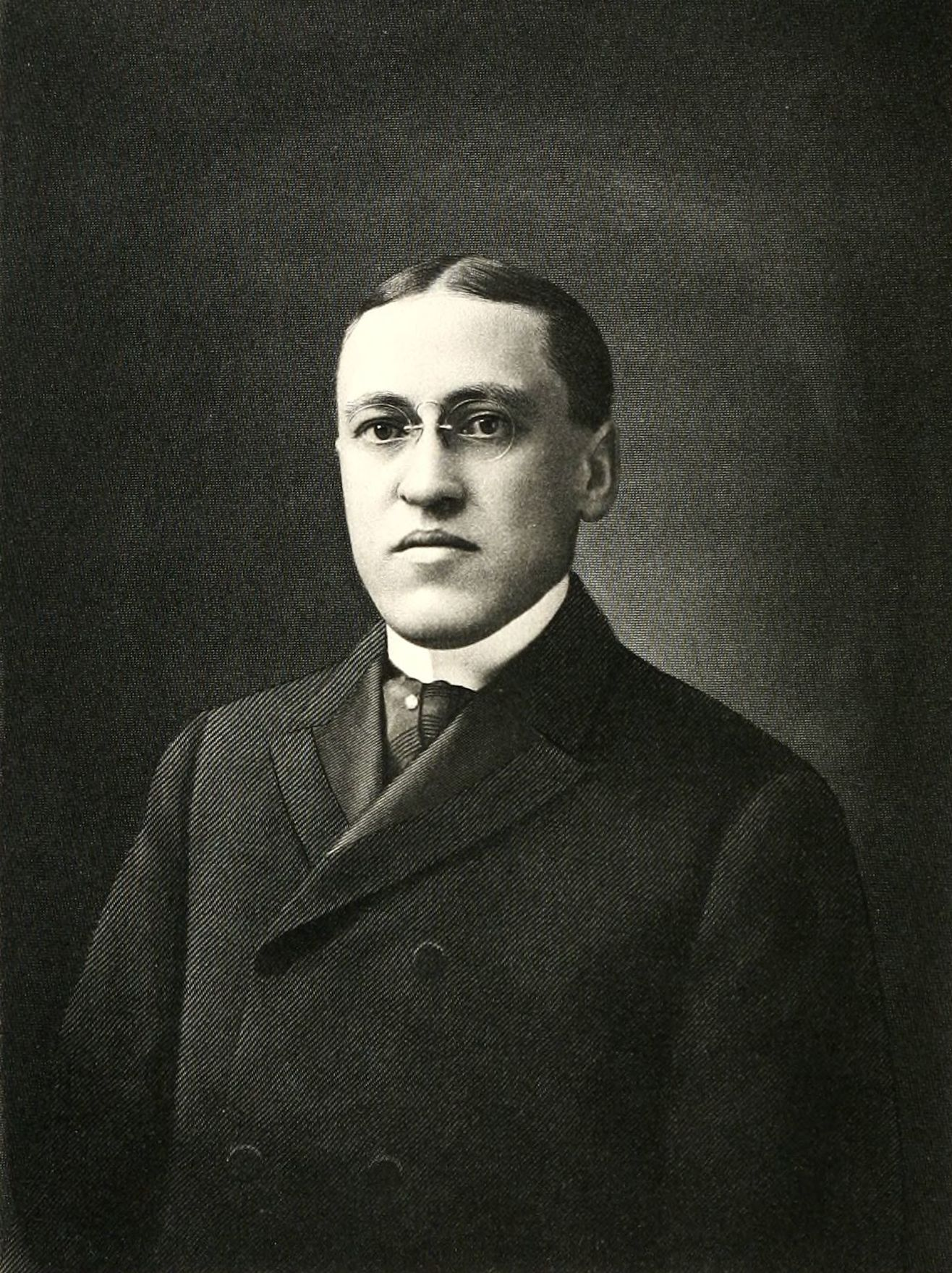
The Smith brothers, clockwise from top left: Lyman, Wilbert, Hurlbut, and Monroe

The company originated in 1886, when the Smith Premier Typewriter Company was established by Lyman C. Smith and his brothers Wilbert, Monroe, and Hurlbut. The typewriter was the first to use a double keyboard, but it was not the first typewriter that typed both upper and lower case characters; that honor belonged to the Remington #2 that was introduced in 1877–78, the decade before the first Smith Premier was placed on the market. The advertisements boasted that there was "a key for every character!"

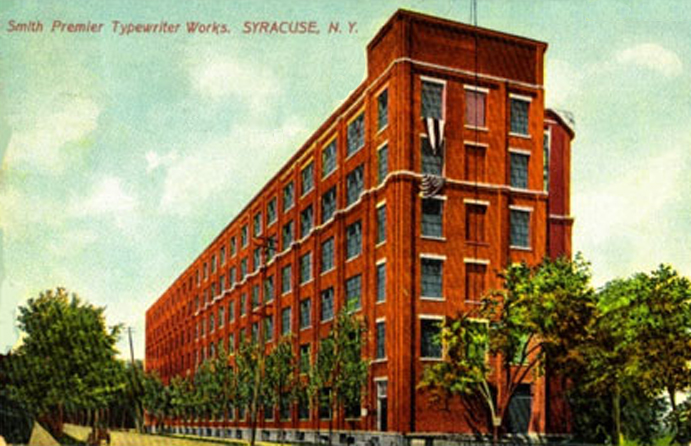
Smith Premier Typewriter Co., Syracuse, New York c.1910 – The building began in early March 1903 and was completed in about four months. It closed around 1921 when the Smith Premier Typewriter Company was fully absorbed by Remington Typewriter Company. This is a street-side view; powerhouse and rail spur are behind, out of view on the right.

In 1889, the Smith-Premier, the first typewriter to bear the Smith name, was manufactured in Lyman C. Smith's gun factory on South Clinton Street in Syracuse, New York. Alexander T. Brown, an employee, invented the machine, and Wilbert Smith financed the construction of the prototype.

=== Union Typewriter Company ===
During 1893, Smith joined with the Union Typewriter Company, a trust in Syracuse which included rival firms Remington, Caligraph, Densmore and Yost.

Not long after, Union took action and blocked the Smith Premier Typewriter Company from using the new front strike design, which allowed typists to see the paper as they typed. As a result, the Smith brothers quit in 1903 and founded L. C. Smith & Bros. Typewriter Company. The new company soon released the "L.C. Smith & Bros. Model No. 2," which was an odd beginning because, a full year later, they released the "L.C. Smith & Bros. Model No. 1." Carl Gabrielson invented both models.

In 1906, the Rose Typewriter Company of New York City marketed the first successful portable typewriter. They were bought out by Smith in 1909, renamed Standard Typewriter Company, and moved upstate to Groton, New York.

=== Typewriter services ===
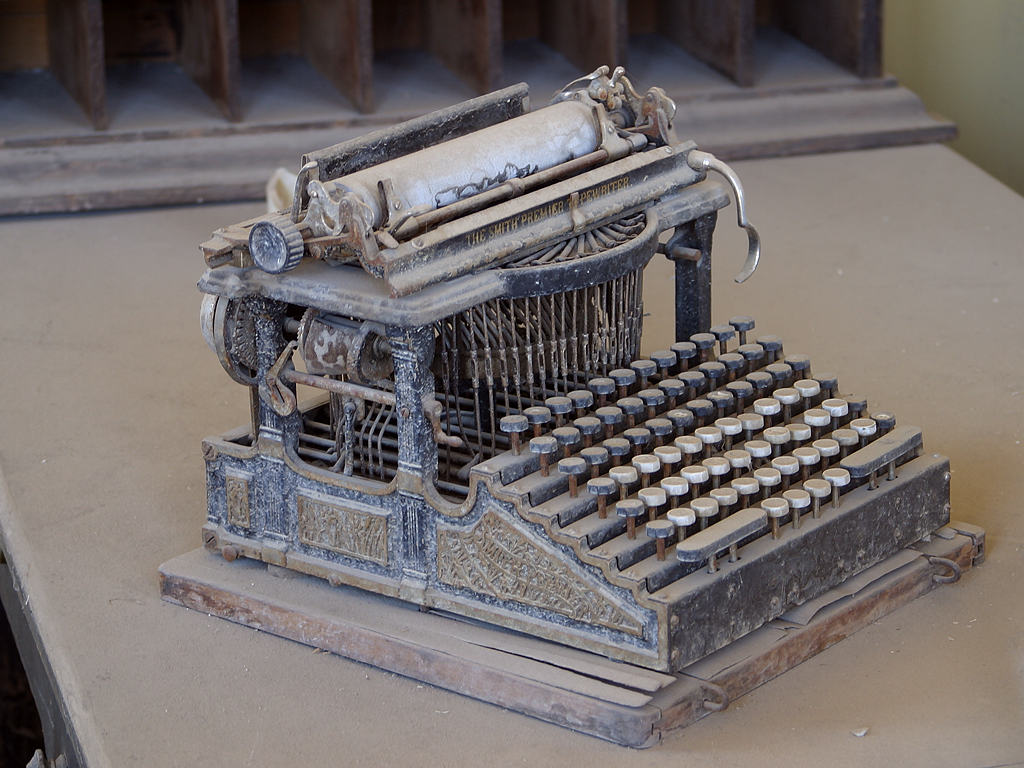
This Smith Premier typewriter, purchased around the end of the 19th century, was found abandoned in the Bodie, California, ghost town. Note the square key alignment, unlike most typewriter keyboards, but similar to the original keyboard of the much later Commodore Pet microcomputer.

To promote usage of the typewriter, the company began by offering typing services at the company headquarters located at the corner of East Genesee and Washington streets in Syracuse. An advertisement on December 27, 1904, for Smith Premier typewriters, touted the Employee Department which offered services such as finding a "competent stenographer (male or female) to operate any make of machine." The company advertised they could provide the services promptly, saving clients time and trouble and "examining" all applicants. Operators could perform duties such as stenographer, typewriter, telegrapher, and bookkeeper.

=== Corona Typewriter Company ===
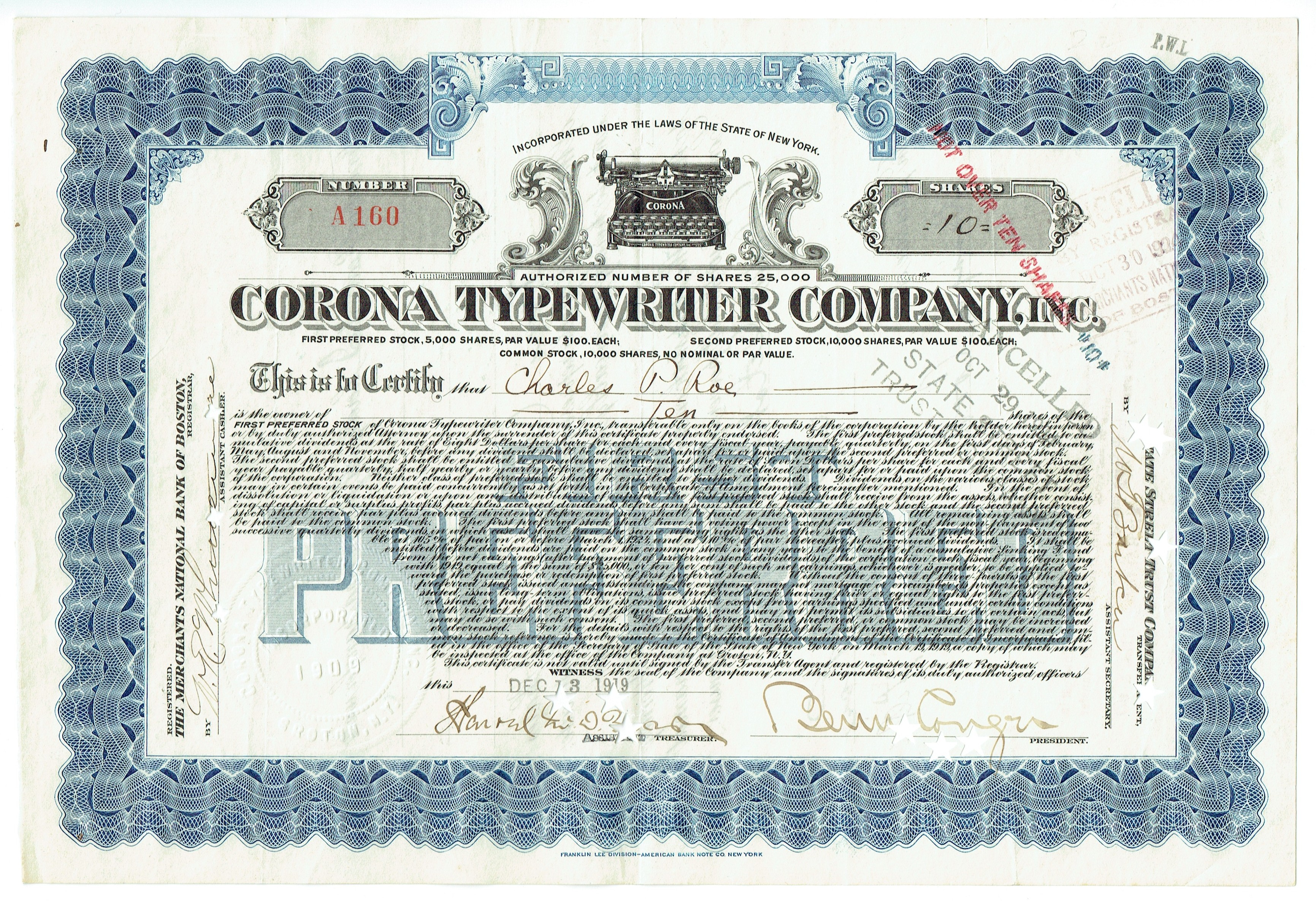
Share of the Corona Typewriter Company from the 13th December 1919

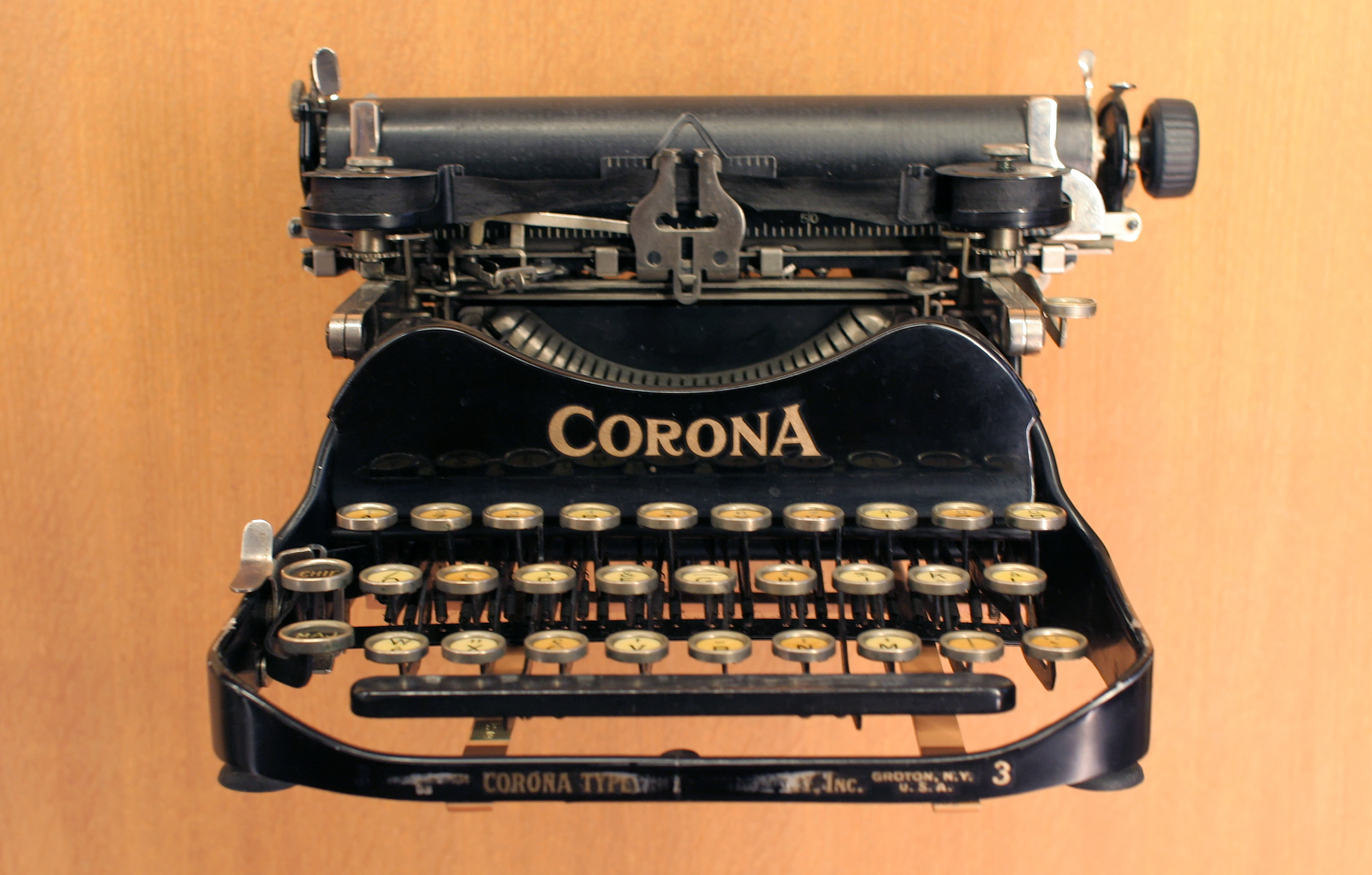
Corona Model 3 Left-Side Shift/Pinch Return, 1912–16

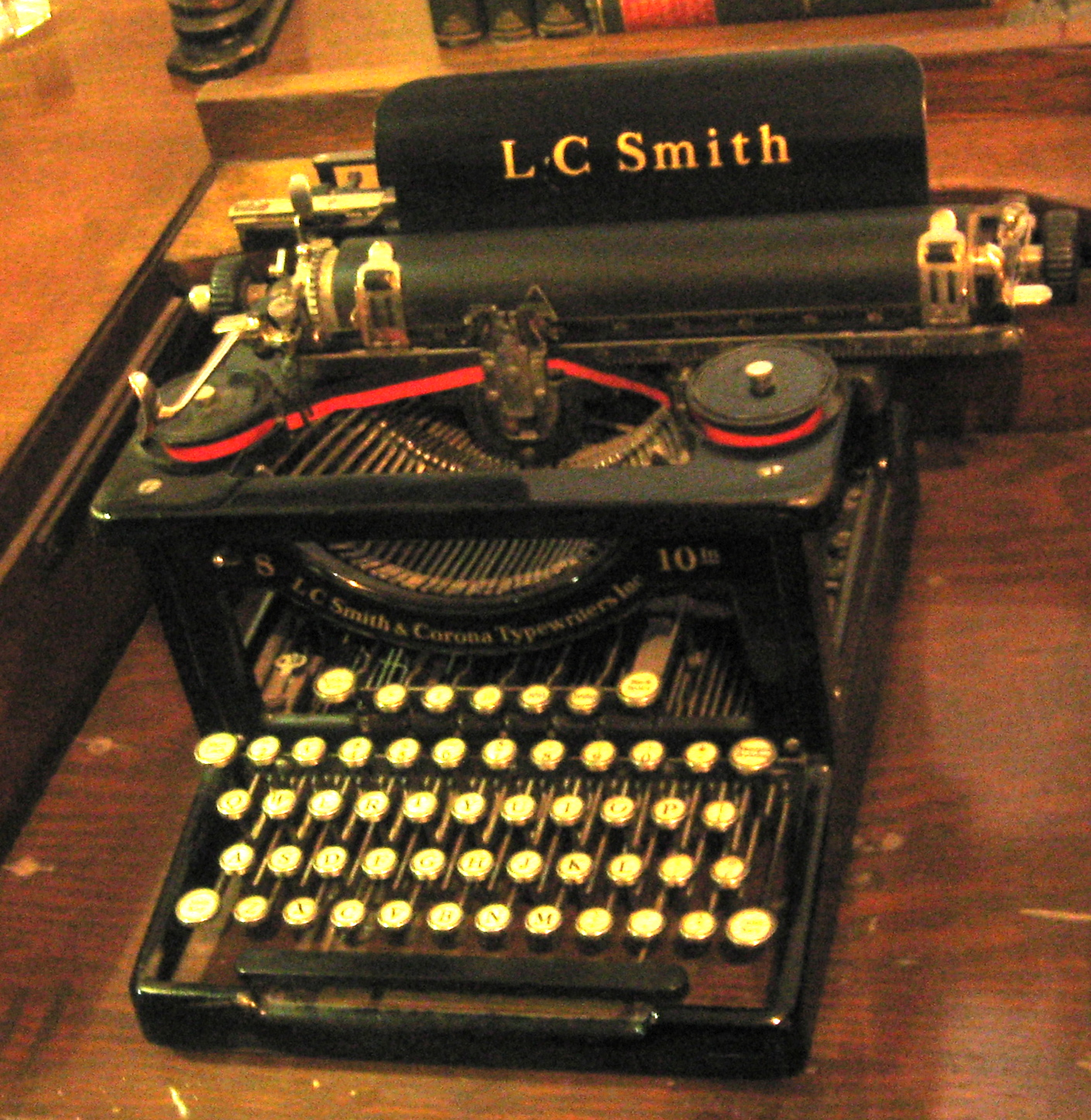
Smith-Corona as used at a newspaper in Saskatoon around 1910

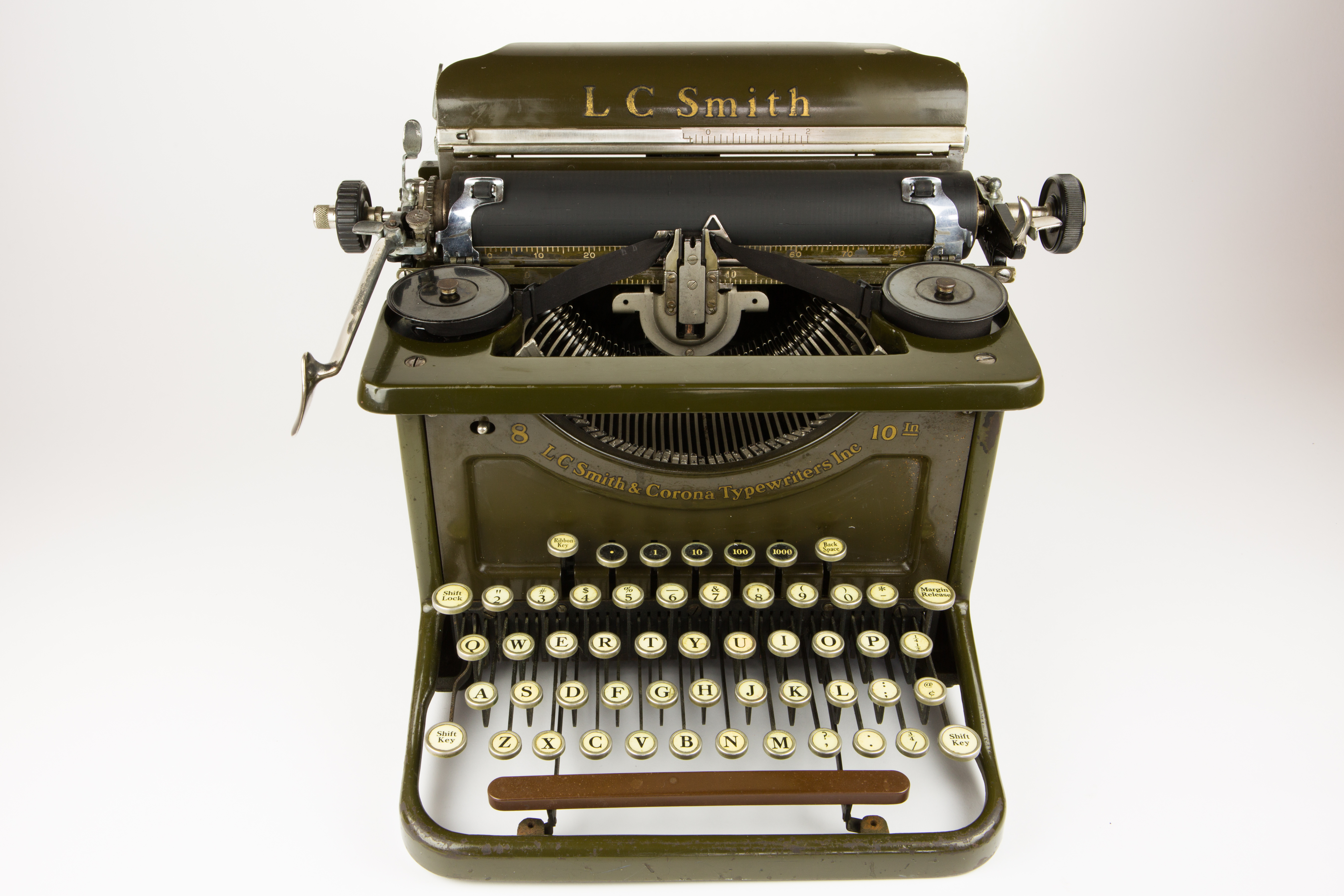
LC Smith US Army - Modèle 8/10 - made in 1934 (USA)

With the success of their Corona model in 1914, Standard Typewriter Company was renamed again and became the Corona Typewriter Company. Smith Corona was created when L. C. Smith & Bros. united with Corona Typewriter in 1926, with L. C. Smith & Bros. making office typewriters and Corona Typewriter making portables.

=== World War II M1903A3 bolt-action rifles ===
Production shifted from typewriters to various military weapons and parts during World War II. In October 1942, Smith-Corona Typewriter Company began producing M1903A3 Springfield rifles at its plant in Syracuse, with assistance from Remington Arms and High Standard Manufacturing Company. Subcontractor barrels give unusual collector value to some of these 234,580 Springfield rifles. Serial numbers 3608000 to 3707999 and 4708000 to 4992000 carry the Smith-Corona name on the receiver ring. While many M1903A3 rifles manufactured by Remington have 2-groove barrels, most rifles assembled by Smith Corona used 4-groove barrels manufactured by High Standard, and approximately five thousand of the barrels finished by High Standard were from 6-groove barrel blanks made by Savage Arms.

Bolts on Remington M1903A3 rifles have a parkerized finish and are stamped with the letter "R" at the root of the handle; Smith Corona bolts are blued and usually stamped with the letter "X" on top of the handle, although some are unmarked. Some extractors on Smith Corona rifles are stamped with the letter "S" on the bottom. Stamped steel stock fittings were generally blued, although some were parkerized in late production. Butt plates of the Smith Corona rifles were checkered with 10 or 11 lines per inch, while Remington used 16 lines per inch.

Rifle production ceased on February 19, 1944, when supplies of standard M1 Garand rifles were considered adequate. Some of the rifles were never issued, while others were reconditioned in government armories after service use. Reconditioned rifles often have substituted parts from Remington or Springfield manufacture. Most rifles were stored after the war until many were sold through the Civilian Marksmanship Program in the early 1960s.

=== Mid-century ===
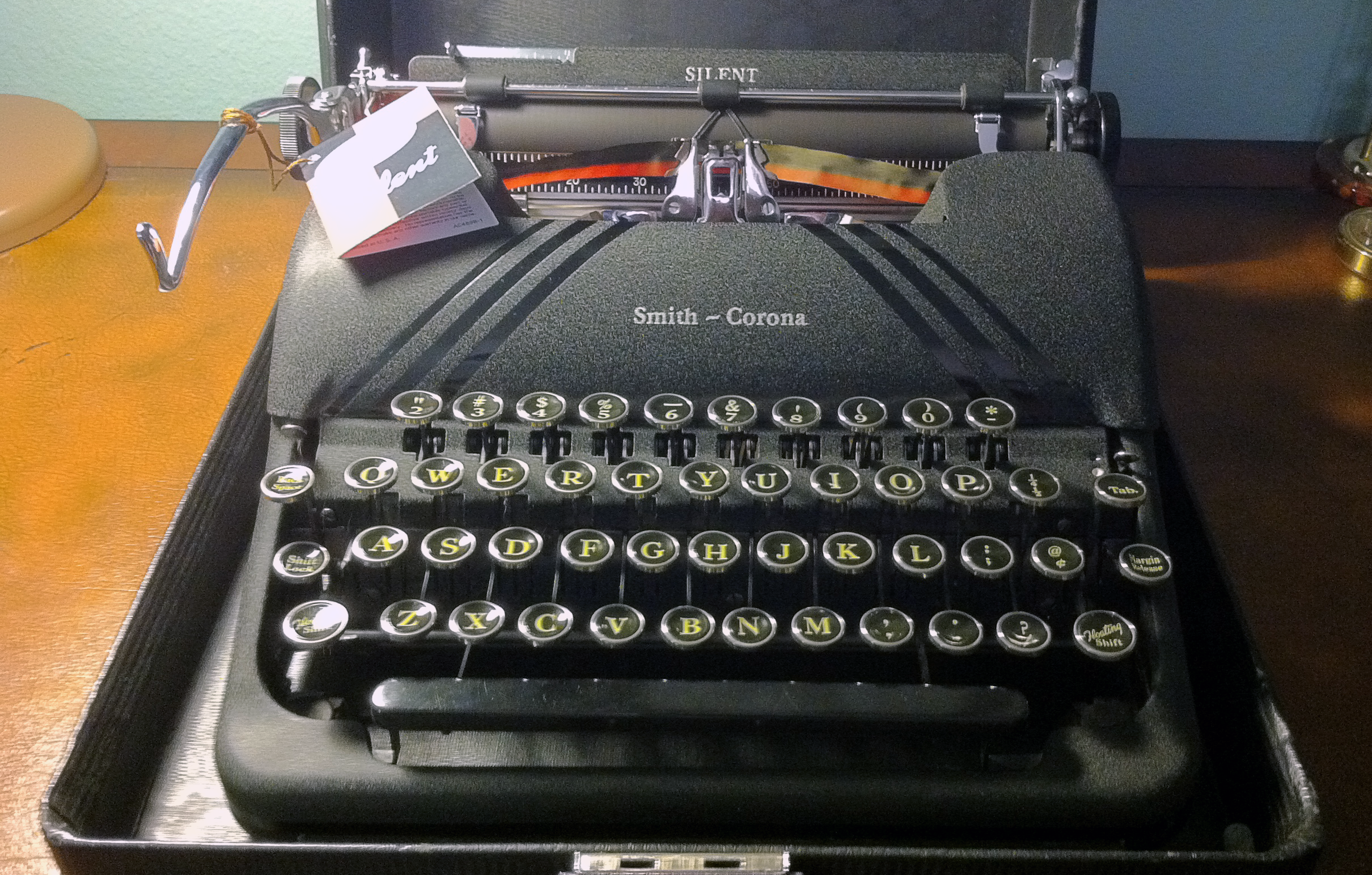
The "Speedline" series portables were made from 1939 to 1948.

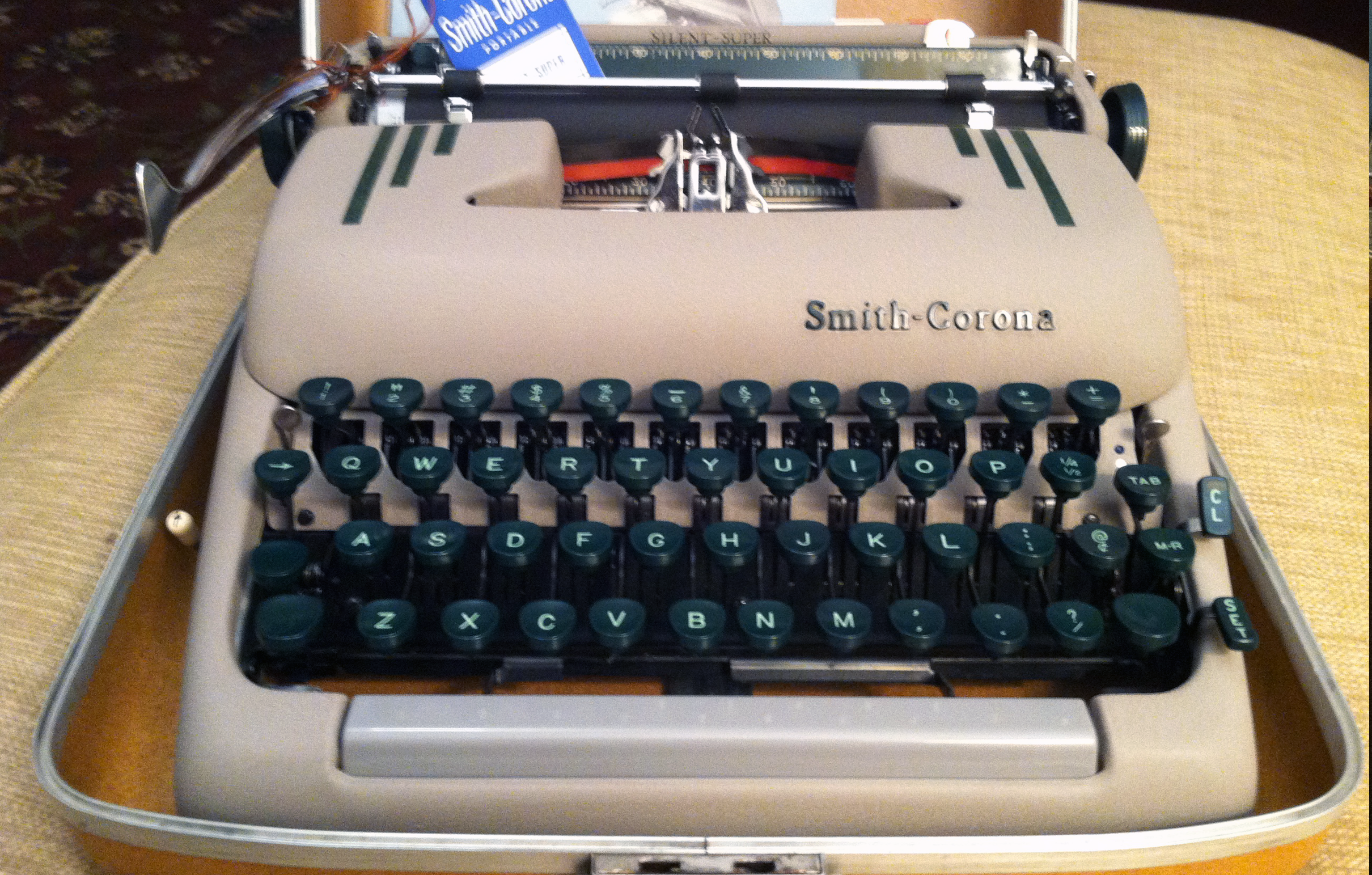
The "Super 5" series portables were made from 1949 to 1960. They are generally considered to be among the best portable typewriters by writers and typists.

After the war, the company concentrated on making its typewriters more convenient and efficient for use in business offices. Typewriter sales peaked after World War II; in response to a demand for typewriters capable of faster output, Smith Corona introduced electric typewriters in 1955. Electric portables, intended for traveling writers and business people, but later widely purchased for general home use, were introduced in 1957. The new portable electric typewriters would become an essential tool for generations of U.S. high school and college students.

In a diversification move into the wider office technology sector, Smith Corona purchased the Kleinschmidt Corporation in 1956 and Marchant Calculator in 1958, changing its corporate name to Smith-Corona Marchant Inc (SCM) Also in 1958, Smith Corona acquired British Typewriters, Ltd. of West Bromwich, England, a company that made small portable typewriters. The company invented the typewriter power carriage return in 1960, the same year it moved from Syracuse to Cortland, New York and opened new corporate headquarters on Park Avenue in New York City.

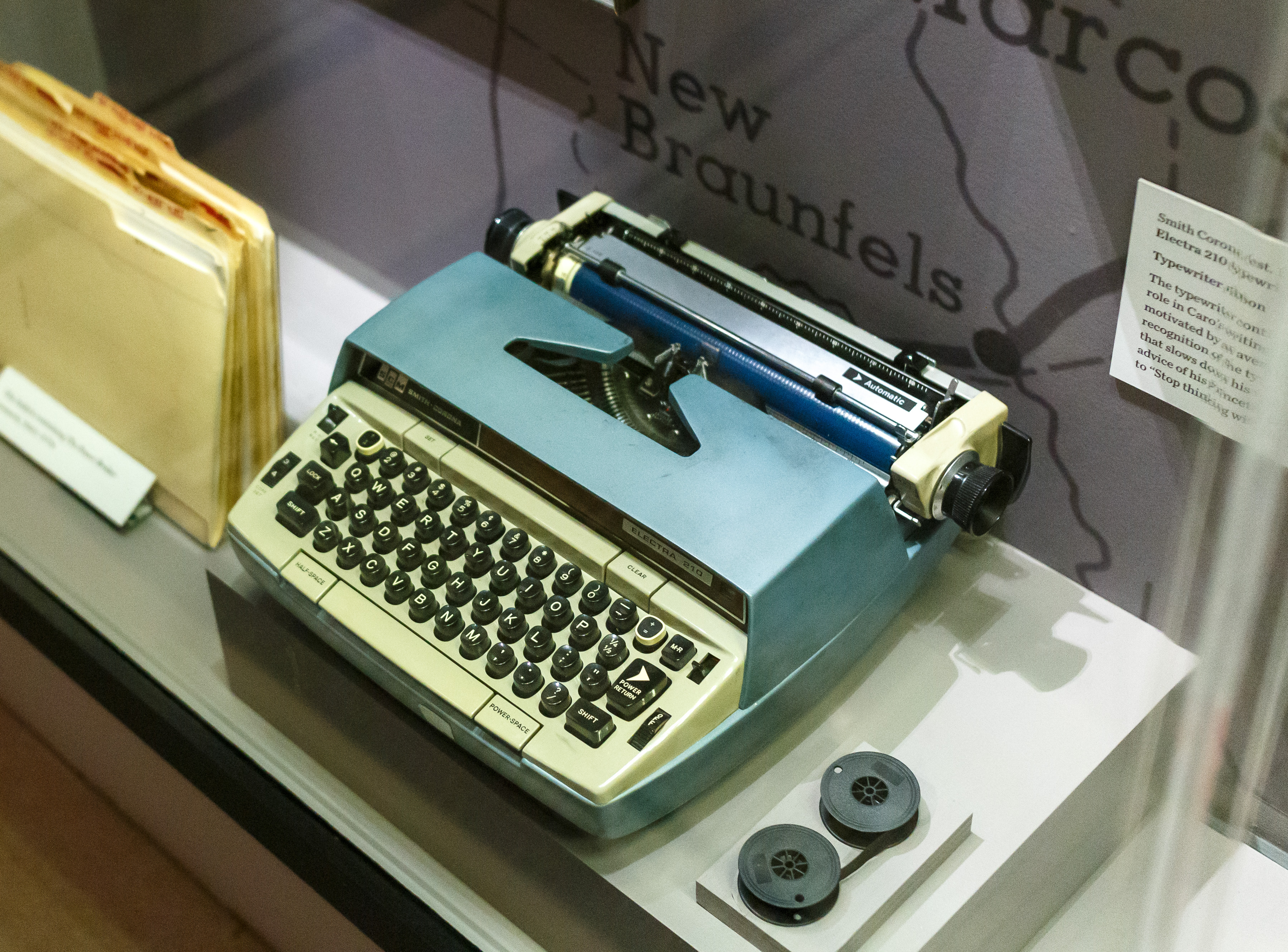
Electra 210 owned by author Robert Caro

1960 also saw the company's first foray into the photocopier business with the Vivicopy range of machines, also the accounting machinery market with a range of punch card and tape products manufactured for it in Germany by Kienzle. Still on the acquisition trail, SCM acquired the St. Louis Microstatic Company in 1961. This merger gave rise to the Model 33 Electrostatic Copier, which went on sale in April 1962.

Thus by the mid-1960s SCM had become a major supplier to the office equipment market, offering photocopiers, typewriters and calculating machines.

In 1962, Smith Corona changed its corporate name to SCM Corporation and adopted the tribar SCM logo. In 1967, SCM purchased the Allied Paper Corporation for $33 million. The paper-making division was named SCM Allied Paper. The same year, SCM merged with The Glidden paint company. Glidden was reorganized as the Glidden-Durkee division of SCM. One reason for this merger was that Glidden saw SCM's bid as a "White Knight" bid in preference to an alternative offer from Greatamerica Corporation in Dallas, Texas and General Aniline & Film of New York. In its turn, the acquisition put the (now much larger) SCM itself beyond the reach of any potential hostile bidders of the time. It was also hoped that Glidden's research into paper coatings would be useful in SCM's copier business.

The "Letterpack" product of 1967 was a handset on which personal voice messages could be recorded on small tape cartridges which could be mailed to the recipient (who needed another handset to replay it). The cartridges lasted 3, 6 or 10 minutes, and a pair of handsets cost $70.

In 1965, SCM was instrumental in developing smaller computers for the business market. The basic computer consisted of an electric typewriter, plug boards, card readers, paper and mag tape readers. The client would purchase a computer and programs specifically designed for their operation. This data processing division was eventually sold to Control Data Corporation in the early '70s.

In 1966, SCM bought the consumer product company Proctor Silex, manufacturers of toasters and can-openers.

In 1973, the company constructed a new typewriter manufacturing facility in Singapore — with 1,300 employees. In the same year, SCM introduced a cartridge ribbon which eliminated the long-standing problem of getting ink-stained fingers from hand-threading a replacement spool of inked ribbon.

=== Financial problems ===
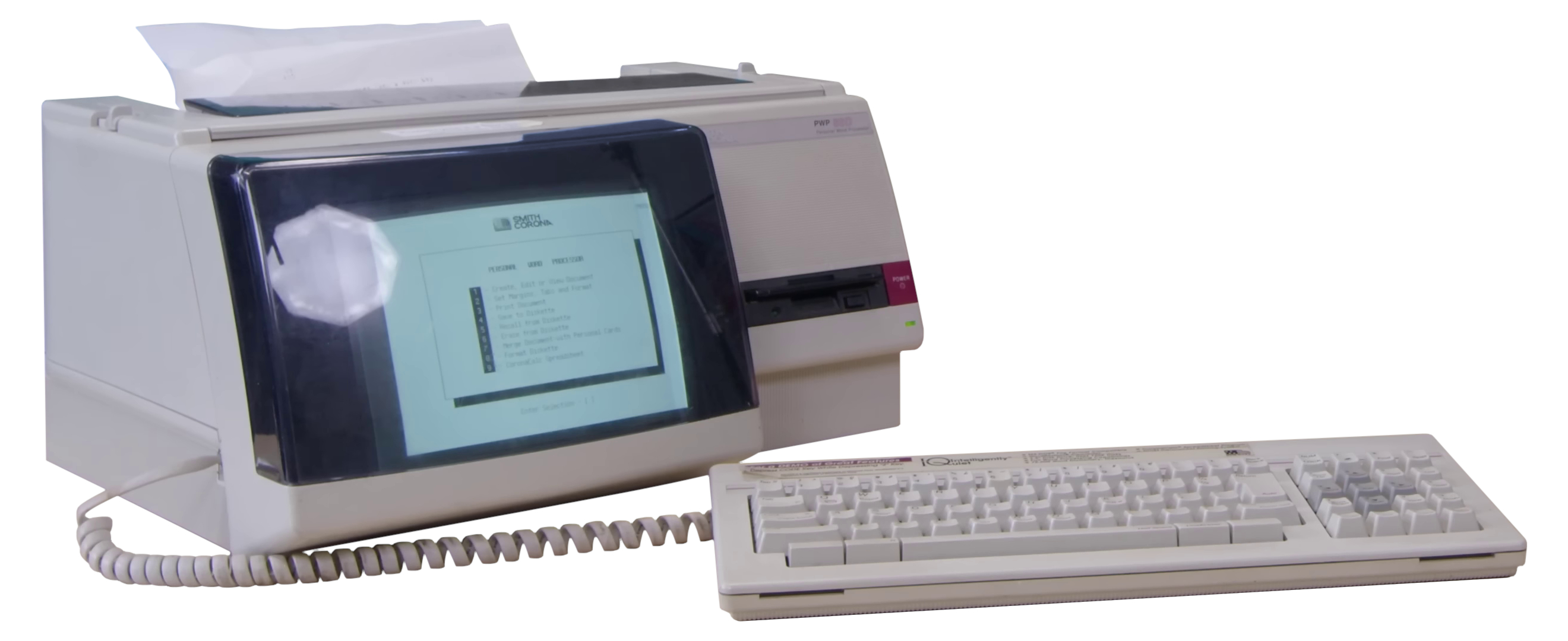
Word Processor Smith Corona PWP-88D

The calculator market collapsed with the advent of inexpensive electronic pocket calculators in the mid-1970s. The typewriter market also faced competition from less expensive imported typewriters, particularly typewriters from Brother Industries, Nakajima and Silver Seiko Ltd..

This was a contributing factor in the closure of the West Bromwich, England, plant in 1981. By 1985, personal computers were widely used for word processing, and SCM launched their first portable word processor, along with the first portable typewriter that included an electronic spelling function. These products were insufficient in the face of the diminishing typewriter market. These trends, along with the bloat of operating divisions without inherent business logic, rendered it vulnerable to takeover. Thus, in 1986, SCM was taken over by Hanson Plc and the company immediately disposed of some SCM divisions, including the headquarters building in New York City, for a significant profit.

The company moved its remaining typewriter manufacturing operations from Cortland to Mexico in 1995 and announced it was cutting 750 jobs as a result of continuing sales declines. Shortly thereafter, the company declared bankruptcy. After 1995, the company concentrated on sales of portable electronic typewriters, as well as typewriter and word processor supplies. The company's then current electronic models featured LCDs, built-in dictionaries, spell check, and grammar check features.

=== Thermal label market ===
After being acquired by a private company during its second bankruptcy in 2000, Smith Corona moved all typewriter manufacturing and typewriter supplies manufacturing to Cleveland, Ohio. Within five years Smith Corona quit manufacturing all typewriters. As the typewriter supply business continued to decline, Smith Corona decided to leverage its expertise in ribbons and thermal technologies it had previously used in the typewriter business, into the growing thermal label market.

== See also ==
- Data Recall Diamond
- Olivetti Lettera 22
- Olivetti Lettera 32
