= Allied Paper Corporation =

American paper company

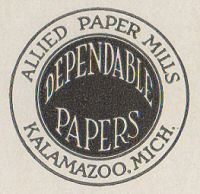
- Type: Public
- Industry: Paper Mill
- Founded: Kalamazoo, Michigan, USA (1921)
- Defunct: 1988
- Fate: Forest depletion and inability to compete forced the mill to close in 1988

The Allied Paper Corporation was created in 1921 by a merger of three paper mills in Kalamazoo and Otsego, both in South-West Michigan, USA. The company grew steadily over the next 40 years but when local forests had been logged off and when profits could no longer support further investments and updates it became uncompetitive. Allied mills were closed or sold during the 1970s and 1980s, and the corporation passed into history during 1988. Hundreds of millions of dollars have since been spent in South West Michigan cleaning up the last Allied Paper mill site and the PCB pollution caused by this company.

== Allied Paper Mills ==
Allied Paper Mills was incorporated in Kalamazoo, Michigan, USA during 1921 when three local paper companies merged. These were the Monarch Paper Company in Kalamazoo, the King Paper Company in Kalamazoo and the Bardeen Paper Company in Otsego. The combined output of 10 paper machines and 34 coating machines immediately placed the Allied Paper Mills in the top producers of book paper in the nation. When operating at full speed and full capacity it was expected that between 1200 and 1800 people would be given employment. A. L. Pratt was selected as company President, and A. G. Gilman and George H. Gerpheide were the vice presidents. George B. Davis was the secretary and S. B. Monroe the treasurer. The new corporation was capitalized at 5,000,000 preferred shares and 5,000,000 shares of no-par value common stock.

By 1925 the Allied Paper Mills employed 1500 people and had produced 2,725 railroad car loads of paper in that year. It was stated by vice-president Alex G. Gilman that the various divisions were in splendid physical condition. Improvements in 1924 included a new boiler house at the Bardeen Mill and rebuilding of paper machines in both the Bardeen and King Mills. The no-par stock was changed to a par value of $10 and 400,000 shares were issued in 1924.

In January 1931, Alex G. Gilman, now president, reported at the annual stockholders meeting that Allied Paper Mills had been profitable in 1930 and noted that the outlook in 1931 was more favorable. Alas, 1931 and 1932 turned out to be difficult years and the company did not make any profits. In January 1934 President Gilman was able to report that profits of $25,000 had been made during 1933. At this time Frederick C. Fisher and John A. Pyl were the vice presidents, S. B. Monroe was still the treasurer. In 1933 the larger of the two mills in Otsego (former Bardeen No 1) was sold to the Menasha Corporation.

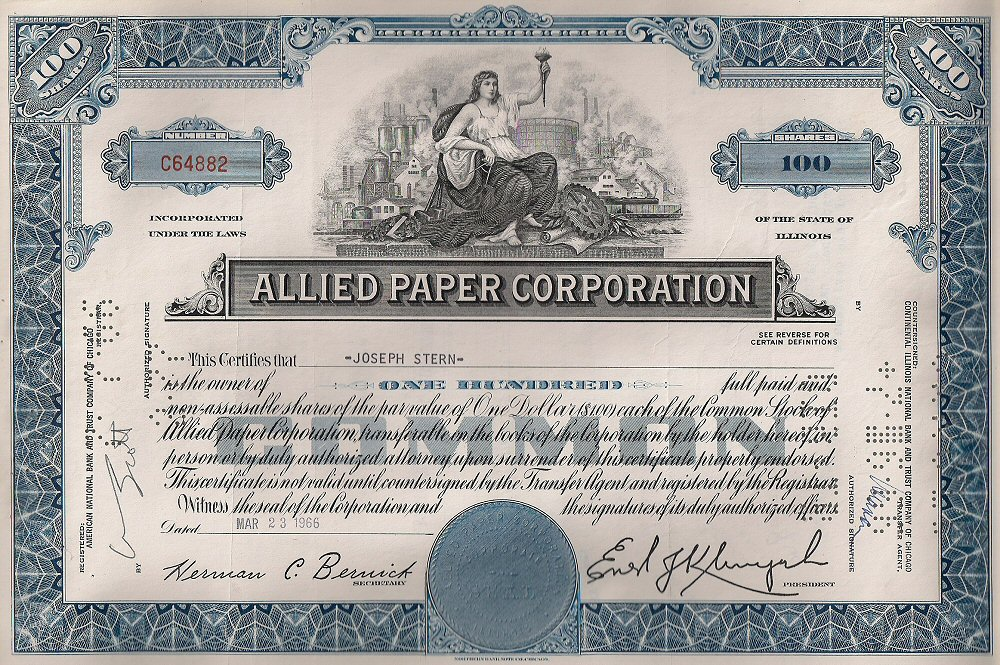
Allied Paper Corporation Stock Certificate issued in 1966

On 2 September 1955 it was announced that the Allied Paper Mills board had approved a plan to be acquired by the Thor Corporation, a maker of household appliances. A special shareholders meeting was called for 3 October so they could vote on this plan, which offered $46 per share of common stock. At this time, Allied was the fifth largest employer in Kalamazoo County, Michigan and had made a net profit of $1,367, 410 in 1954. No executive changes were planned by Thor. The shareholders approved the plan and on 2 December 1955 Arnold H. Maremont, president of Thor Corporation announced the transaction was complete. D. R. Curtenius, who had been the president of the Allied Paper Mills, was retained in a consulting capacity by the new paper-making division of Thor.

In February 1956 it was announced that the coating mill in Otsego would be closed and in June 1956 the Bryant Mill in Kalamazoo was leased for ten years from the St Regis Paper Company with an option to buy. This large and successful Kalamazoo mill dated back to 1895. It had been acquired by Time Inc. of New York (the publishers of magazines Time and Life) in 1945. They invested heavily, including construction of a new research building on Alcott Street in Kalamazoo, but sold the Bryant Mill to the St. Regis Paper Company in 1946. Since this mill produced coated and uncoated book papers it was considered to be a good fit within Allied Paper. In late 1956 the Thor Corporation renamed itself the Allied Paper Corporation with Arnold H. Maremont remaining as president. That same year the APW Products paper mill in Albany, New York was purchased, which added light weight groundwood paper as a product line for the corporation. Allied was now the eighth largest paper producer in the USA.

President Arnold Maremont declared in January 1957 that it was possible the company could double its size within a year and intimated that other paper companies could be acquired. By 1958 the corporation was specializing in three areas of production: book papers, business papers and school supply papers. The Allied book paper lines then included grades from the thinnest bible paper to heavy book paper for novels. Business papers include forms, mimeo, duplication and offset for reproduction machines, bond, carbon insets and special coated papers for electrostatic office copiers. School supply papers include notebook filler, construction and drawing paper, pads, envelopes and reproduction and typing papers. Also in early 1957 Allied announced they would build a large new pulp mill on the north side of Cork St in Kalamazoo but this addition never occurred. Bryant Mills A and B continued to be used to de-ink waste paper for use as stock in the Kalamazoo paper mills. This use of recycled paper would cause huge problems for the corporation in future years. Included in the recycled paper was carbonless copy paper manufactured by the National Cash Register (NCR) Company and this paper contained toxic polychlorinated biphenyls (PCBs).

In October 1958 Dr. Ward D. Harrison was named Allied Paper Corporation president. Losses in 1957 and 1958 were replaced by a profit of $670,000 in 1959. Allied was now the third largest employer in Kalamazoo behind the KVP Sutherland Paper and Upjohn companies. At this time the Allied Paper Corporation also owned Phillips Control Corp, specializing in electronic components, and Max Eckhardt and Sons Ornament Corporation, makers of Christmas decorations.

== Expansion in the 1960s ==
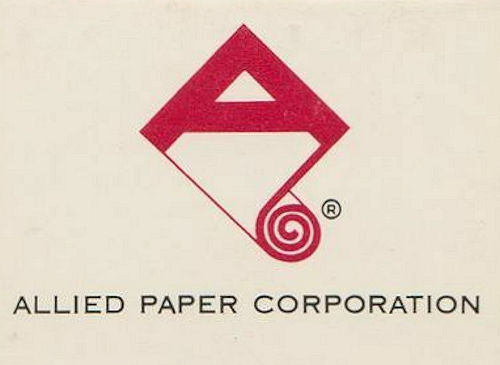
1960s era Allied Paper Corporation logo

In 1960 Allied Paper created a new organization for the marketing of business forms. This was called Allied-Egry Business Systems and was under direction of Jack Kennedy, former vice president for sales at The Egry Register Co. Eight business forms companies had been acquired with plants in Kalamazoo, Michigan Dayton, Ohio; Denison, Texas; Kansas City, Missouri; Leipsic, Ohio; Los Angeles, California and Petersburg, West Virginia. President Ward D. Harrison reported that profits for 1960 had dropped to $403,539 on sales of $37 million. The Phillips and Eckhardt operations were spun off during 1960 so the corporation was now in the paper business only. It was reported in the 1960 annual report that due to substantial improvements made in the Bryant Mill since 1956 amounting to $2.1 million, this mill was recorded as a purchased property. Allied was conducting research and development in the business paper field with photocopying types of papers getting an ever-increasing research focus.

In 1963 a new pulping building at the King Mill was opened. Pulp from this was shipped to the Bryant Mill, allowing the suspension of pulping operations in Bryant Mills A and B. Also in 1963 the Allied Paper Corporation started construction of a $12 million pulp mill in Jackson, Alabama. This was a logical location for processing virgin timber in the southern forests. All the standing timber in South West Michigan had already been used up. Most of the planned 100,000 tons of paper pulp produced each year at Jackson would be shipped by railroad to the Kalamazoo mills. When the new Allied pulp mill came on-line in 1965, virgin pulp was indeed shipped by rail to Kalamazoo, resulting in the closure of most de-inking operations in Kalamazoo. All paper recycling stopped abruptly in 1971 upon the discovery of toxic PCB contamination. The Bryant pulp mill buildings were sold in 1972 to a company called American Pulp. Nothing ever came from this sale and the buildings were demolished in 1978–79.

In 1965 a paper machine was being installed at the Jackson, Alabama site for a cost of $11 million. It could produce up to 250 tons of paper per day. In spite of numerous strikes at its mills, Allied profits were $114,494 and $806, 304 in 1964 and 1965 respectively. Dr. Ward Harrison was elevated to chairman of the board. New president Ernest Klimczak reported that the Jackson, Alabama pulp mill was in full operation and producing 400 tons of paper pulp a day. During 1967, Allied Paper acquired the Rex Mill in Kalamazoo, Michigan and then sold most of it to another paper manufacturer, the Eaton-Dikeman Company, within 6 months of the purchase.

== Acquisition by the Smith Corona Marchant Corporation ==
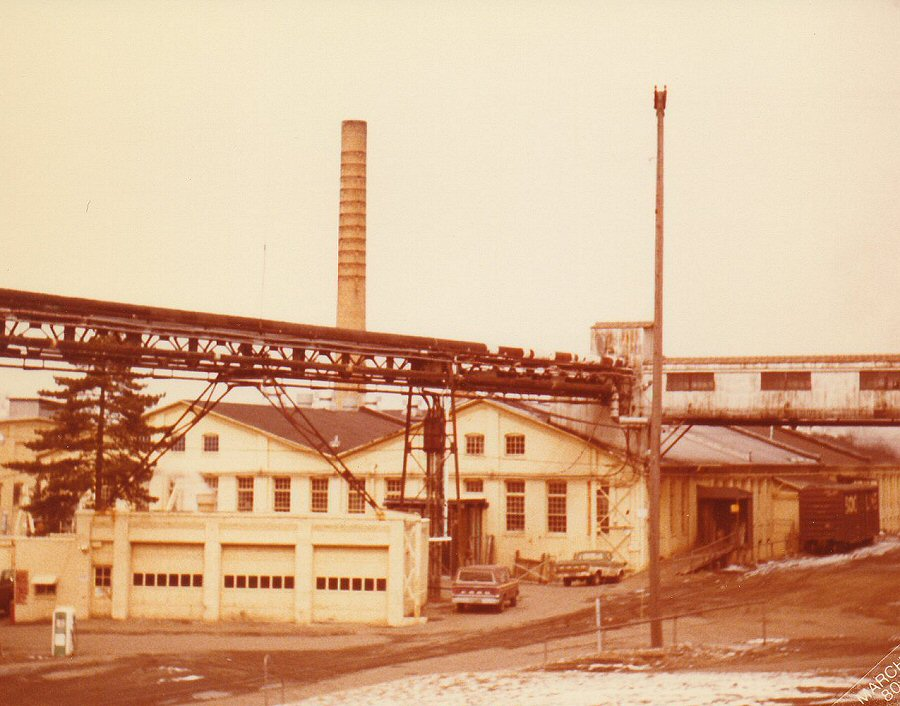
SCM Allied Paper Bryant Mill D in March 1980

In 1967 the Allied Paper Corporation was purchased by the Smith Corona Marchant (SCM) Corporation for $33 million and became the paper-making division of that entity. The transaction was completed on 20 December of that year. SCM shares were issued in place of Allied shares, which were valued at $24.25 a share. The new paper-making division was named SCM Allied Paper. Ernest Klimczak continued as president for paper making and all other Allied Paper Corporation officers were retained. Dr. Ward Harrison became an SCM vice president. At this time, SCM Allied Paper employed 1,300 people in its Kalamazoo mills and was the second largest employer in the City of Kalamazoo behind the Brown Company, another paper maker. Total Allied employment in the United States was 2,880 people.

SCM invested in their new papermaking operation, including installation of the first vertical papermaking machine in the U.S. during 1969. It was stated by Dr Ward Harrison that this machine represented the first basic technology increase since the Fourdrinier horizontal-forming paper machine was introduced almost 170 years ago. Paper could be made on this machine more economically and with better physical characteristics.

During the first half of the 1970s, SCM Allied Paper was the market leader in the lightweight paper field, used exclusively in bibles. Investments made in the 1960s were paying off handsomely. Also paying off was that Allied owned the entire manufacturing process, since it had pulp mills, paper mills and converting operations which produced forms and other final paper products. A new 18,000 square feet (1,700 m^{2}) headquarters building for the papermaking division of SCM was constructed on Portage Road in Kalamazoo during 1974 and 1975. However, new and larger mills located in the Southern U.S. and Canadian forests were making the Allied mills in Kalamazoo uncompetitive. The King Mill had closed in 1970 and the Monarch Mill closed in 1981, leaving just the Bryant Mill operating in Kalamazoo plus the pulp and paper mills in Jackson, Alabama. Also in 1981 the paper coating operation in Bryant Mill E was shut down.

== Subsequent owners ==
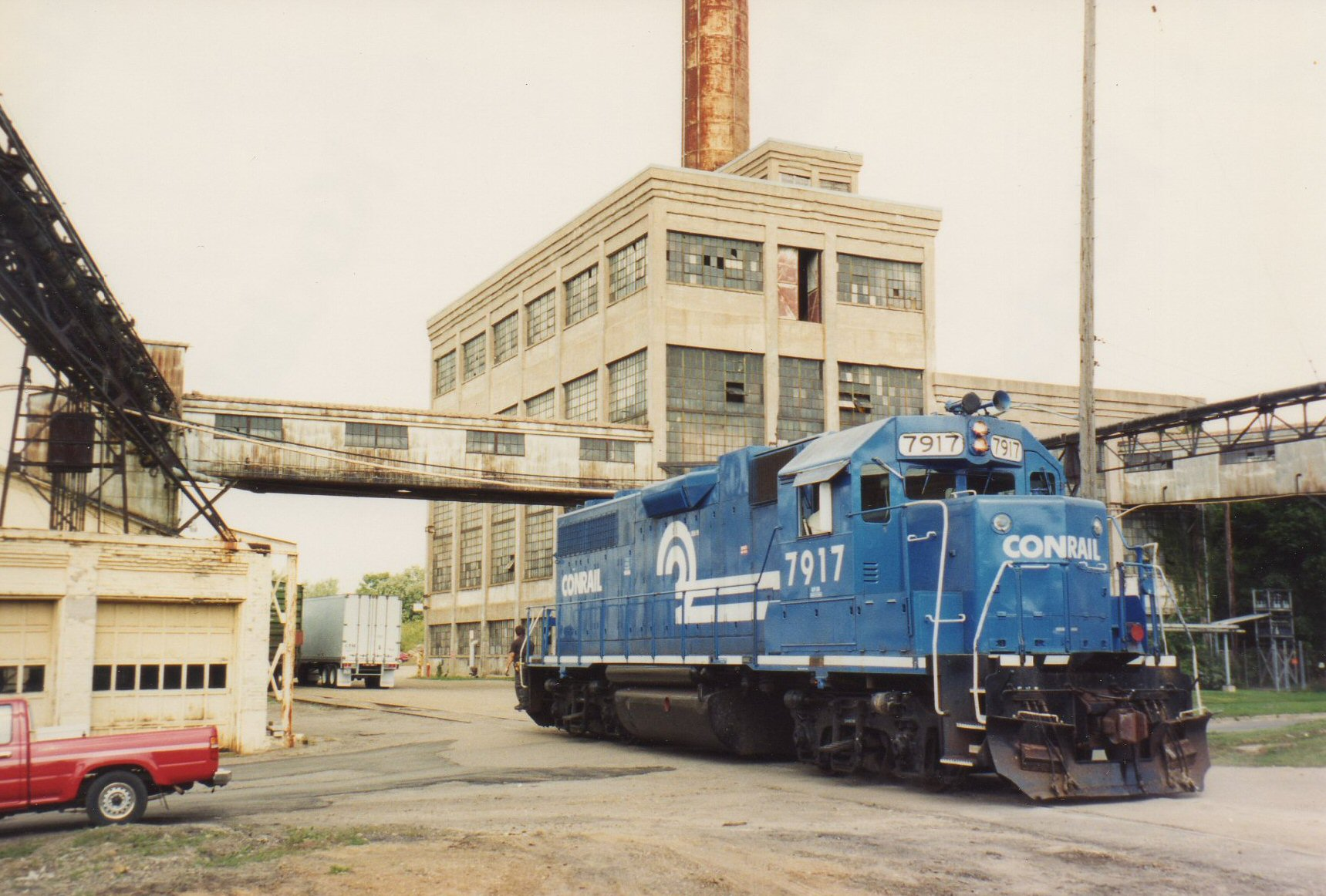
Conrail locomotive at the Portage Paper Co. Bryant Mill, Kalamazoo with the Power House Behind it in 1993

In 1986, SCM was bought by Hanson plc, a British conglomerate, but they had no interest in the paper business, which was no longer as profitable as it had been in the past decades. In particular the Bryant Mill in Kalamazoo was losing money because book papers, the mainstay of that mill, were not high-priced commodity items and larger, more automated mills had taken business away. All the mills were quickly put up for sale.

In 1988, Michael Gallenberger, an Illinois businessman, spent most of the year negotiating with Hanson to buy the Bryant Mill in Kalamazoo. He promised to spend $10 million on upgrades to the mill. This purchase involved getting pay and benefit concessions from the 304 union workers left at that time. These concessions were rejected by union members on August 31 but were approved in a second vote on October 14 by a 51 to 49 percent margin. On December 31, 1988, Hanson completed the sale of the Bryant Mill to Michael Gallenberger, who formed a company called Performance Papers Inc. The transaction was completed for $7 million to $12 million. Cleanup responsibilities for Portage Creek remained with Hanson. The pulp and paper mills in Jackson, Alabama were sold to Boise Cascade in May 1986 for $150 million. The name of Allied Paper had lasted from 1921 until 1988 but had now become history.

Performance Papers Inc. started up the paper machines at the Bryant Mill early in 1989. Unfortunately the paper business slumped in 1989 and due to slow sales of specialty papers and increased costs it had to close on November 9. It had been in operation for less than a year. In early 1990, the Norfolk Paper Company started negotiating with Performance Papers Inc. to reopen the Bryant Mill in Kalamazoo. Getting financing proved to be difficult but by November 1991 a lease agreement had been signed. The new company was named Portage Paper Co. In May 1992 production restarted with Michael Gallenberger as general manager. The plan was for the mill to use recycled corrugated containers and some clippings from box plants to make butchers' paper, paper used by industry to buffer sheets of metal and small lunch bags.

This operation proved to be more successful than Performance Papers had been but after 5 years of operation, Portage Paper shut down on February 13, 1997, citing 18 months of significant operating losses caused by a combination of insufficient capital and a very weak and unstable paper market. More than 140 people lost their jobs.

== After closure of the Bryant Mill ==
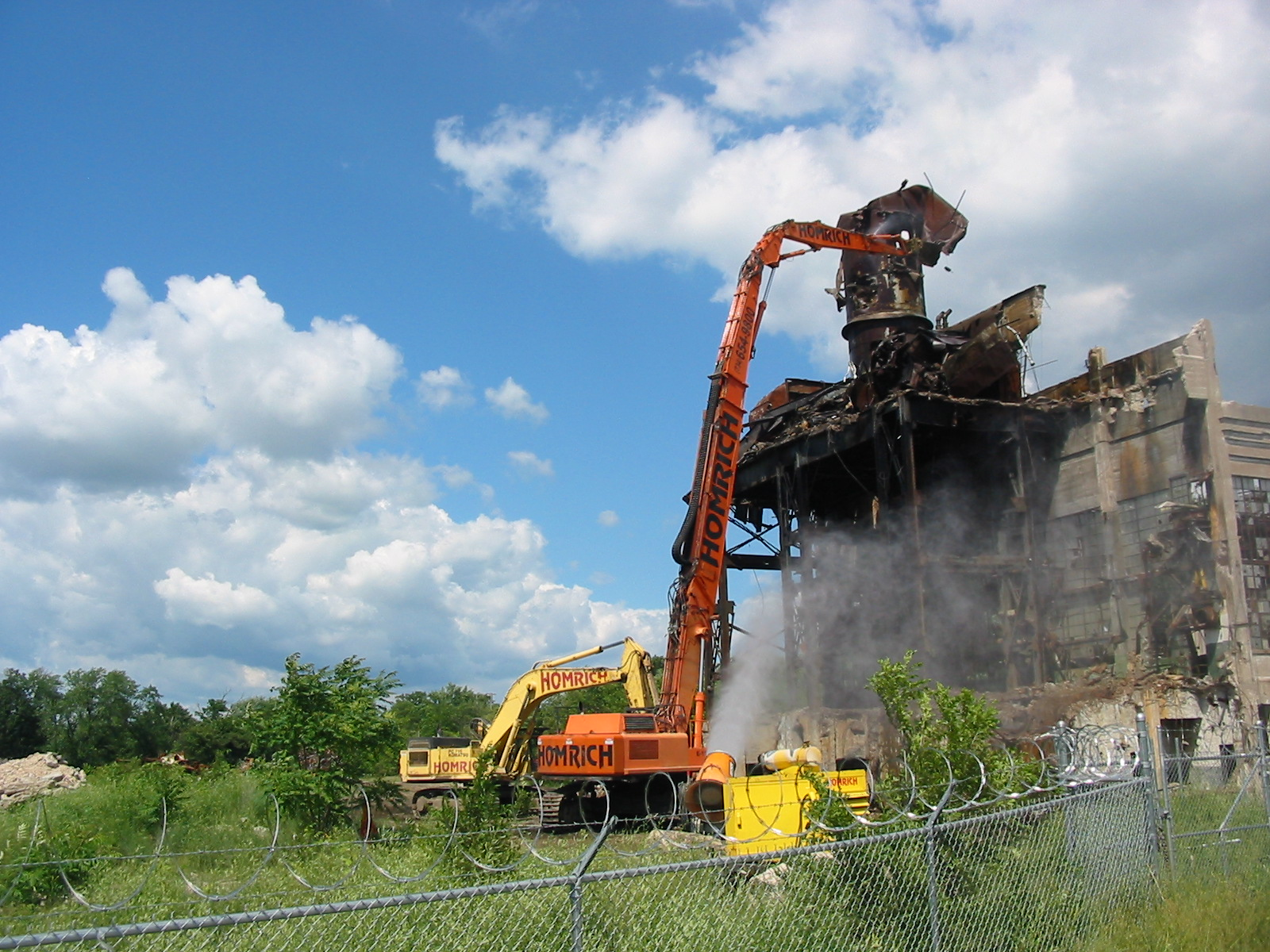
Demolition of Bryant Mill, Kalamazoo Power House in June 2008

After this closure, GAF Corporation attempted to lease the Bryant Mill site and use it for manufacturing of roofing felt. They anticipated employing 50 to 60 workers and producing 45,000 tons of roofing felt each year. Investment of $20 million was promised and a 10-year lease was signed but this operation did not come to pass.

After sitting empty and unused for some 7 years, demolition of the Bryant Mill started in 2004, paid for by the State of Michigan. Money ran out before completion of the job so the large power plant on site was not demolished at that time. The State of Michigan allocated another $1 million for demolition of the power plant, which occurred in the summer of 2008. With $3.3 million from the Great Lakes Restoration Initiative all traces of the Bryant Mill were removed in 2011. The concrete channel containing Portage Creek was also removed and there is now no trace that a large paper mill has ever operated on the site. The only Allied Paper Corporation building remaining in Kalamazoo, Michigan is the 1975 headquarters on Portage Road, which has become a community center. The former Allied Paper pulp and paper mills in Jackson, Alabama sold to Boise Cascade are still in operation.

In 2018, the former Allied paper mill site in Kalamazoo was sold to Kyle-From-Camp Inc.

== PCB pollution in Kalamazoo ==
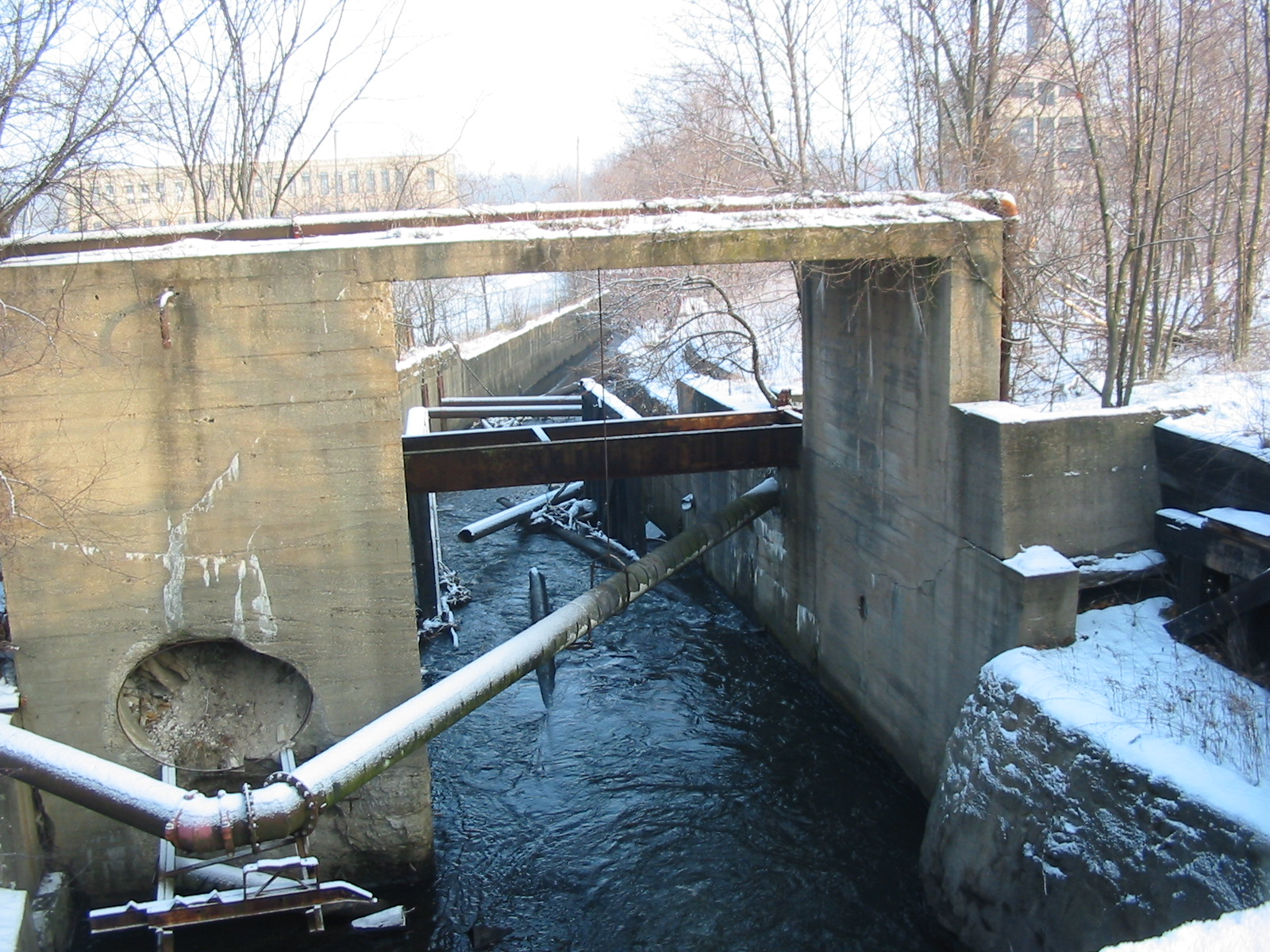
Portage Creek running through the Allied Paper Bryant Mill site in December 2007

Starting in the 1950s, the Allied Paper operation in Kalamazoo began to use recycled waste paper for stock. Mixed in with this waste paper was carbonless copy paper, often called NCR (No Carbon Required) paper. This type of paper was sold by the NCR corporation and between at least 1957 and 1971 it contained PCBs as an ink carrier. The use of PCBs were banned in the early 1970s but by then the area between the Monarch and Bryant Mill sites, where settling lagoons were used after 1950 to remove suspended particles within the waste water from the recycling process, contained over 110,000 pounds of PCBs. There were 8 million cubic yards of contaminated material. In addition, the PCBs had traveled along Portage Creek and into the Kalamazoo River, causing significant contamination all the way downstream to the dam at Allegan, Michigan. The United States Environmental Protection Agency (EPA) declared this a Superfund Site.

SCM Allied Paper was held legally responsible for cleanup of the lagoons and ponds used by the Monarch and Bryant Mills. Along with Georgia-Pacific it was held legally responsible for the cleanup of PCBs in the Kalamazoo River. Through acquisitions this responsibility transferred sequentially to the following corporations: Hanson PLC, Millennium Chemicals, Lyondell and finally LyondellBasell, headquartered in the Netherlands. Cleanup of sediment in the Kalamazoo River at Plainwell and Otsego was accomplished in 2008 and 2009, partly funded by LyondellBasell. In 2009 LyondellBasell went bankrupt. After 15 months they emerged from bankruptcy reorganized after reaching agreement with the US Government to provide $103 million for the Kalamazoo Superfund Site, of which $49.5 million was allocated to the EPA for PCB cleanup.

A March 2008 report prepared for the Michigan Department of Environmental Quality (MDEQ) detailed analytical information about the Bryant-Monarch Superfund Site. A 2009 feasibility study report for Millennium Chemical details the remediation options. The specific cleanup plan will be proposed by the US EPA in 2012. A May 2010 article in Bloomberg Markets on how bankruptcy law is being used to avoid the cost of environmental cleanup included the PCB contamination caused by Allied Paper.
