= Super Match Soccer =

1998 video game

- Developer(s): Cranberry Source
- Publisher(s): Acclaim Entertainment
- Designer(s): Jon Ritman and others
- Platform(s): PC, PlayStation
- Release: August 1998
- Genre(s): Sports
- Mode(s): Single-player, multiplayer

Super Match Soccer is an association football video game published by Acclaim Entertainment and developed in 1998 by Jon Ritman. The game was released for PC and PlayStation and is the last game in the Match Day series.

== Gameplay ==
Super Match Soccer is a 3D video game with five camera angles to see the simulation, each one with four zoom factors. It includes 24 national teams with different skill levels. The player can choose footballers playing in their team and tactic. Names and attributes of each footballer can be edited.

The game can be played against a computer A.I., or other human players. Three or more players are supported using a network connection on PC or a PlayStation Multitap for PlayStation. It also supports analogue controllers for both PC and PlayStation.

== Development and release ==
The game was developed as a sequel to Match Day, several years after the popular Match Day II. It was presented in a PlayStation preview in Spain as Matchday 3 but due to legal problems it was ultimately released as Super Match Soccer.

The game was exhibited at the September 1997 European Computer Trade Show. At this time, Ocean Software, the owner of the Match Day series, was slated to publish the game.
