= Match Day (series) =

- Genre(s): Football simulation game
- Developer(s): Ocean Software; Cranberry Source
- Publisher(s): Ocean Software; Acclaim
- Creator(s): Jon Ritman

Match Day is an association football video game franchise created by Jon Ritman in 1984 for the 1980s 8-bit home computer market.

== Games in the series ==
The following games are part of the Match Day series. All of the games were published by Ocean, with the exception of Super Match Soccer:

- Match Day is the first game in the series. It was created in 1984 and released on most home computers of the era, but is most well known for its Sinclair Spectrum incarnation. It was designed and developed by Jon Ritman with the help of Chris Clarke.
- International Match Day is an improved version of Match Day published in 1986 for the ZX Spectrum 128 with better sound and some full screen images.
- Match Day II was released in 1987 for the Amstrad CPC, ZX Spectrum, MSX and Commodore 64 platforms. It was written by Jon Ritman, with graphics by Bernie Drummond and music and sound by Guy Stevens (Commodore version, programmed by John Darnel). The game was the first one to include complete control over ball direction, power and elevation (using a kickometer), and a brand new deflection system (Diamond Deflection System).
- Final Whistle was the name of an arcade machine very similar to Match Day 2 (it was previously called Soccerama during development). Although it was finished it was never released.
- Super Match Soccer was released in 1998 by Acclaim. Although its working title was The Net, it was intended to be released as Match Day III (it was even presented as such in a PlayStation preview in Spain), but due to licensing problems the name was finally changed. It was developed in 1998 by Cranberry Source and published by Acclaim. The game is available for PC and PlayStation.
