= Data Recall Diamond =

The Data Recall Diamond One was a word processing typewriter, designed and built by Data Recall Ltd at Dorking, Surrey, England in the late 1970s and early 1980s. The machine drove a diablo 1355 daisy wheel printer via a parallel interface at 35–55 characters per second, and used an 8-inch floppy disc drive capable of holding 250,000 characters. It was user programmable. Later models included the Diamond III, the Diamond Five (a.k.a. Diamond V), and the Diamond 7.

One of the names suggested for the Amstrad PCW was the Zircon, on the grounds that zircon was "a Diamond substitute". This name was rejected.
