= Batman (1986 video game) =

1986 video game

- Amstrad CPC cover art
- Publisher: Ocean Software
- Designers: Jon Ritman; Bernie Drummond
- Series: Batman
- Platforms: ZX Spectrum, Amstrad CPC, MSX, Amstrad PCW
- Release: 1986
- Genre: Action-adventure
- Mode: Single-player

Batman is a 1986 isometric action-adventure game by Ocean Software for the Amstrad PCW, Amstrad CPC, ZX Spectrum, and MSX, and the first Batman game developed. The game received favourable reviews. An unrelated Batman game was released two years later, titled Batman: The Caped Crusader.

== Gameplay ==
ZX Spectrum version

The object of the game is to rescue Robin by collecting the seven parts of the Batcraft hovercraft that are scattered around the Batcave. The gameplay takes place in a 3D isometric universe, which programmer Jon Ritman and artist Bernie Drummond would further develop for 1987's Head Over Heels, and is notable for implementing an early example of a save game system that allows players to restart from an intermediate point in the game on the loss of all lives rather than returning all the way to the start (in this case the point at which Batman collects a "Batstone").

== Reception ==
Reception

Review scores
Publication	Score
Crash	93%
Computer and Video Games	37/40
Sinclair User	5/5
Your Sinclair	9/10
Your Computer	4/5

Awards
Publication	Award
Crash	Crash Smash
Sinclair User	SU Classic
Your Sinclair	MegaGame
ZX Computing	Monster Hit

Batman was received well by the computer game press at the time. Crash gave it a rating of 93%, Your Sinclair scored it 9/10 and Sinclair User gave it five stars and rated it as a "classic". The game reached the number one position in the Amstrad, ZX Spectrum and All-Format charts in the same week in May 1986.
