= Head over Heels (video game) =

1987 video game

Head Over Heels
- Developers: Ocean Software; Retrospec (remakes)
- Publishers: Ocean Software; Piko Interactive (Jaguar, Steam); QUByte Interactive (Switch)
- Producer: D. C. Ward
- Programmer: Jon Ritman
- Artist: Bernie Drummond
- Composer: Guy Stevens
- Platforms: Amstrad CPC, Amstrad PCW, Atari 8-bit, Atari ST, Commodore 64, Amiga, MSX, ZX Spectrum, Windows, Mac OS X, BeOS, Linux, Jaguar, Nintendo Switch
- Release: 1987
- Genre: Action-adventure
- Mode: Single-player

Head Over Heels is an action-adventure game published by Ocean Software in 1987 for several home computers. It uses an isometric engine similar to the Filmation technique first developed by Ultimate Play the Game. Head Over Heels is the second isometric game by Jon Ritman and Bernie Drummond, after their earlier Batman computer game was released in 1986. The game received favourable reviews and was described by Zzap!64 as an "all time classic".

== Gameplay ==
Heels tries to catch a ride (Amstrad CPC)

The player controls two characters with different abilities.

Head can jump higher than Heels, control himself in the air, and fire doughnuts from a hooter to paralyze enemies.

Heels can run twice as fast as Head, climb certain staircases that Head cannot, and carry objects around in a bag.

These abilities become complementary when the player combines them after completing roughly a sixth of the game. Compared to its predecessors, the game offers unique and revolutionary gameplay, complex puzzles, and more than 300 rooms to explore.

Drummond contributed some famously surreal touches, including robots (controlled by push switches) that bore a remarkable resemblance to the head of Charles III (then Prince of Wales) on the body of a Dalek. Other surreal touches include enemies with the heads of elephants and staircases made of dogs that teleport themselves away as soon as Head enters the room.

== Plot ==
Headus Mouthion (Head) and Footus Underium (Heels) are two spies from the planet Freedom. They are sent to Blacktooth to liberate the enslaved planets of Penitentiary, Safari, Book World and Egyptus, and then to defeat the Emperor to prevent further planets from falling under his rule.

Captured and separated, the spies are placed in the prison headquarters of Castle Blacktooth. They must first escape, then break through the market to the orbiting Moonbase. From there they can teleport down to each planet and locate and reclaim the stolen crowns. Liberating the planets and defeating the Emperor will allow Head and Heels to return to Freedom as heroes.

== Development ==
Jon Ritman re-used and modified the isometric engine he created for Batman to support the control of two characters instead of just one. Modifications were made to the code for the C64 version to lower processor load, but in the end there was little difference between the versions.

== Reception ==
Reception

Review scores
Publication	Score
Amstrad Action	95% (Amstrad)
Crash	97% (Spectrum); 65% (Spectrum); 89% (Spectrum re-release)
Computer and Video Games	34/40 (Amstrad); 93% (Spectrum re-release)
Sinclair User	9/10 (Spectrum re-release); 5/5 (Spectrum)
Your Sinclair	9/10 (Spectrum); 98% (Spectrum re-release)
Zzap!64	98% (C64)

Awards
Publication	Award
Crash	Crash Smash
Sinclair User	SU Classic
Zzap!64	Gold Medal
CVG	CVG Hit!
Amiga Power	24th best game of all time
Amstrad Action	Mastergame
Crash	Best arcade adventure

Your Sinclair awarded Head over Heels 9/10 in the June 1987 issue and the game was placed at number 5 in the Your Sinclair official top 100. Sinclair User also awarded 9/10. It was chosen by Your Sinclair editors and readers as the ZX Spectrum's 1987 Game of the Year.

Crash magazine gave Head over Heels 97% and called the game "the best fun you are likely to have with a Spectrum for quite some time".

Zzap!64 gave the Commodore 64 conversion of the game 98%: enough for its coveted Gold Medal Award; the joint highest score in the magazine's history; and the first Gold Medal of the year - in its August 1987 issue. It was described as "an all time classic - not to be missed for any reason".

Commodore Force said it was the 3rd best Commodore 64 game of all time.

== Remakes ==
Head over Heels has been remade several times, both authorized and unauthorized.

- Two unreleased remakes were developed for MS-DOS: one worked on in 1999-2000 and the second in 2000-2001.
- Retrospec's remake (2003) for Windows, OS X, BeOS, and Linux Later released via Steam by Piko Interactive, and on Switch by Atari SA.
- Piko Interactive released an Atari ST port of Head Over Heels for the Atari Jaguar.
- A Nintendo Switch port was released in October 2021, based on the Retrospec 2003 remake
- FX Software's remake for the MSX. Originally an unofficial fan remake, but the developers came to an agreement with then-IP holders Piko Interactive in August 2019.
- RustyPixels remake for the ZX Spectrum Next with extra rooms with Chickens to collect as a side-quest.
- An open source remake based on an earlier project with updated, higher-resolution graphics and a 50 Hz frame rate

== Sequel ==
In 2026 a sequel, Return to Blacktooth, a Head Over Heels adventure, was published by Thalamus Digital for the Atari ST and Commodore Amiga. Programmer Colin Porch had begun work on the game in 1989, but it was cancelled by Ocean Software due to the rise of consoles over computers. Following a reunion of Ocean employees, Porch was encouraged to complete the game 37 years after he had first started work on it.
