= Jon Ritman =

British video game designer

Jon Ritman is a game designer and programmer notable for his work on 1980s computer games, primarily for the ZX Spectrum and Amstrad CPC home computers.

== Career ==
His first experience with a computer was when he was 13, his first computer was a Sinclair ZX81 he bought in 1981.

His first game, Namtir Raiders for the ZX81, gained its name from his surname reversed. He first drew attention with his games Bear Bovver and Match Day for the ZX Spectrum.

In 1988, Ritman was voted Best Programmer Of The Year at the Golden Joystick Awards.

In 2014 Ritman appeared in the documentary feature film From Bedrooms to Billions, which tells the story of the British video game industry from 1979 to its release.

== Games ==
- Namtir Raiders, Artic
- Cosmic Debris, Artic
- 3D Combat Zone, Artic
- Dimension Destructors, Artic
- Bear Bovver, Artic
- Match Day series, Ocean
- Batman, Ocean
- Head over Heels, Ocean
- Monster Max, Rare/Titus
- Super Match Soccer, 1998

Ritman also worked on two other football games that were not published:

- Final Whistle was developed for the Razz arcade system, but was cancelled as it looked like an improved version of Match Day II not suitable for arcade games.
- Soccerama was developed for Super Nintendo Entertainment System, but did not pass Nintendo's quality control due to a bug that could not be fixed.
