= Amstrad PCW =

1985–1998 series of personal computers

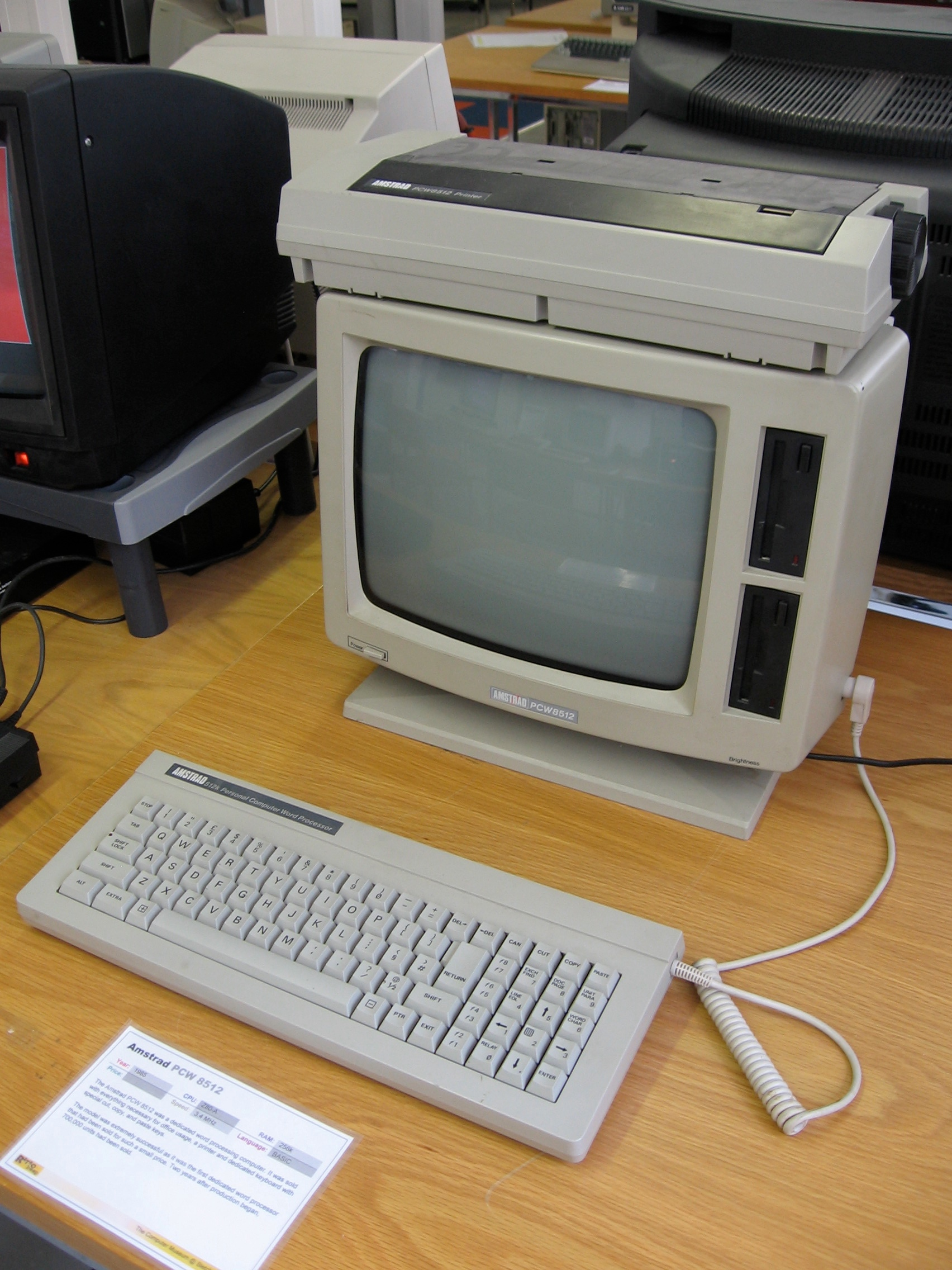
- PCW 8512 in a museum
- Developer: Amstrad
- Manufacturer: Amstrad
- Type: Personal computer
- Released: September 1985; 41 years ago
- Lifespan: 1985–1998
- Discontinued: 1998; 28 years ago
- Units sold: 8 million
- Media: Floppy disks (3-inch and 3½-inch)
- CPU: Zilog Z80
- Memory: 256 KB – 1 MB

The Amstrad PCW series is a range of personal computers produced by British company Amstrad from 1985 to 1998, and also sold under licence in Europe as the "Joyce" by the German electronics company Schneider in the early years of the series' life. The PCW, short for Personal Computer Word-processor, was targeted at the word processing and home office markets. When it was launched, the cost of a PCW system was under 25% of the cost of almost all PC compatibles in the UK, and as a result the machine was very popular both in the UK and in Europe. The series sold 8 million units. The last two models, introduced in the mid-1990s, were commercial failures, because PC compatibles now offered falling prices, greater capabilities, and a wider range of software compared to 1985.

The series consists of PCW 8256 and PCW 8512 (introduced in 1985), PCW 9512 (introduced in 1987), PCW 9256 (introduced in 1991), PCW 10 and PcW16 (introduced in 1995).

In all models, the monitor's casing contains the CPU, RAM, floppy disk drives, and power supply for all of the systems' components. All models except the last included a printer in the price. Early models use 3-inch floppy disks, while those sold from 1991 onwards use 3½-inch floppies.

All models use a Z80 CPU, running at 4 MHz in earlier models and higher speeds in later models. Standard RAM is 256 KB or 512 KB, depending on the model.

All models except the last shipped with the Locoscript word processing program, the CP/M Plus operating system, Mallard BASIC, and Dr. Logo. The last model, PcW16, has a custom GUI operating system.

A wide range of other CP/M office software and several games became available, some commercially produced and some free. Although Amstrad marketed all but the last model as text based systems, graphical user interface peripherals and the supporting software also became available. The last GUI model is incompatible with software for previous PCW models.

== Development and launch ==
In 1984, Tandy Corporation executive Steve Leininger, designer of the TRS-80 Model I, admitted that "as an industry we haven't found any compelling reason to buy a computer for the home" other than for word processing. Amstrad's founder Alan Sugar realised that most computers in the United Kingdom were used for word processing at home, and allegedly sketched an outline design for a low cost replacement for typewriters during a flight to the Far East. This design has a single "box" containing all the components, including a portrait-oriented display, more convenient for displaying documents than the usual landscape orientation. However the portrait display was quickly eliminated because it would have been too expensive, and an included printer also became a separate unit. To reduce the cost of the printer, Amstrad commissioned an ASIC (custom circuit) from MEJ Electronics, which had developed the hardware for Amstrad's earlier CPC-464. Two other veterans of the CPC-464's creation played important roles, with Roland Perry managing the PCW project and Locomotive Software producing the Locoscript word processing program and other software. The CP/M operating system was added at the last minute. During development the PCW 8256 / 8512 project was code-named "Joyce" after Sugar's secretary.

For the launch the product name "Zircon" was jointly suggested by MEJ Electronics and Locomotive Software, as both companies had been spun off from Data Recall, which had produced a word processing system called "Diamond" in the 1970s. Sugar, preferring a more descriptive name, suggested "WPC" standing for "Word Processing Computer", but Perry pointed out that this invited jokes about Women Police Constables. Sugar reshuffled the initials and the product was launched as the "Personal Computer Word-processor", abbreviated to "PCW". The advertising campaign featured trucks unloading typewriters to form huge scrap heaps, with the slogan "It's more than a word processor for less than most typewriters". In Britain the system was initially sold exclusively through Dixons, whose chairman shared Sugar's dream that computers would cease to be exclusive products for the technologically adept and would become consumer products.

== Impact ==
In 1986, John Whitehead described the Amstrad PCW as "the bargain of the decade", and technology writer Gordon Laing said in 2007, "It represented fantastic value at a time when an IBM PC compatible or a Mac would cost a comparative fortune". At its British launch in September 1985, the basic PCW model was priced at £399 plus value added tax, including printer, word processor program, the CP/M operating system and associated utilities, and Mallard BASIC and Dr. Logo. Software vendors quickly made a wide range of additional applications available, including accounting, spreadsheet, and database programs, so that the system was able to support most of the requirements of a home or small business.

Shortly afterwards the Tandy 1000 was introduced in the UK with the MS-DOS operating system and a similar suite of business applications and became the only other IBM-compatible personal computer system available for less than £1,000 in Britain. At the time the cheapest complete systems from Apricot Computers cost under £2,000 and the cheapest IBM PC system cost £2,400. Although competitors' systems generally had more sophisticated features, including colour monitors, Whitehead thought the Amstrad PCW offered the best value for money.

In the US the PCW was launched at a price of $799, competing with Magnavox VideoWriter and Smith Corona PWP, two word-processing systems also including a screen, keyboard, and printer. Popular Science thought that the PCW could not compete as a general-purpose computer, because its use of non-standard 3-inch floppy disk drives and the old CP/M operating system would restrict the range of software available from expanding beyond the spreadsheet, typing tutor, and cheque book balancing programs already on sale. However, the magazine predicted that the PCW's large screen and easy-to-use word processing software would make it a formidable competitor to dedicated word processors in the home and business markets. The system was sold in the US via major stores, business equipment shops and electronics retailers.

The PCW redefined the idea of "best value" in computers by concentrating on reducing the price, which totally disrupted the personal computer market. The low price encouraged home users to trade up from older, simpler systems like the ZX Spectrum. According to Personal Computer World, the PCW "got the technophobes using computers". In the first two years over 700,000 PCWs were sold, gaining Amstrad 60% of the UK home computer market, and 20% of the European personal computer market, second only to IBM's 33.3% share. Having gained credibility as computer supplier, Amstrad launched IBM-compatible PCs, once again focussing on low prices, with its PC1512 surpassing the IBM PC on performance and beating even the Taiwanese clones on price. Amstrad became the dominant British personal computer company, buying all the designs, marketing rights and product stocks of Sinclair Research Ltd's computer division in April 1986, while Apricot later sold its manufacturing assets to Mitsubishi and became a software company.

The magazines 8000 Plus (later called PCW Plus) and PCW Today were published specifically for PCW users. In addition to the usual product reviews and technical advice, they featured other content such as articles by science fiction writer and software developer Dave Langford on his experiences of using the PCW.

By 1989, 1.5 million units had been sold. When the PCW line was retired in 1998, 8 million machines had been sold. The Daily Telegraph estimated in 2000 that 100,000 were still in use in the UK, and said that the reliability of the PCW's hardware and software and the range of independently produced add-on software for its word processing program were factors in its continued popularity. Laing said the PCW line's downfall was that "proper PCs became affordable". IBM, Compaq and other vendors of more expensive computers had reduced prices drastically to increase demand during the early 1990s recession. In 1993 the PCW still cost under £390 while a PC system with a printer and word processing software cost over £1,000, but after adjustment for inflation the retail price of a multimedia IBM-compatible PC in 1997 was about 11% more than that of a PCW 8256 in 1985, and many home PCs were cast-offs, sometimes costing as little as £50, from large organisations that had upgraded their systems.

== Models and features ==
=== PCW 8256 and 8512 ===
PCW 8256 and 8512
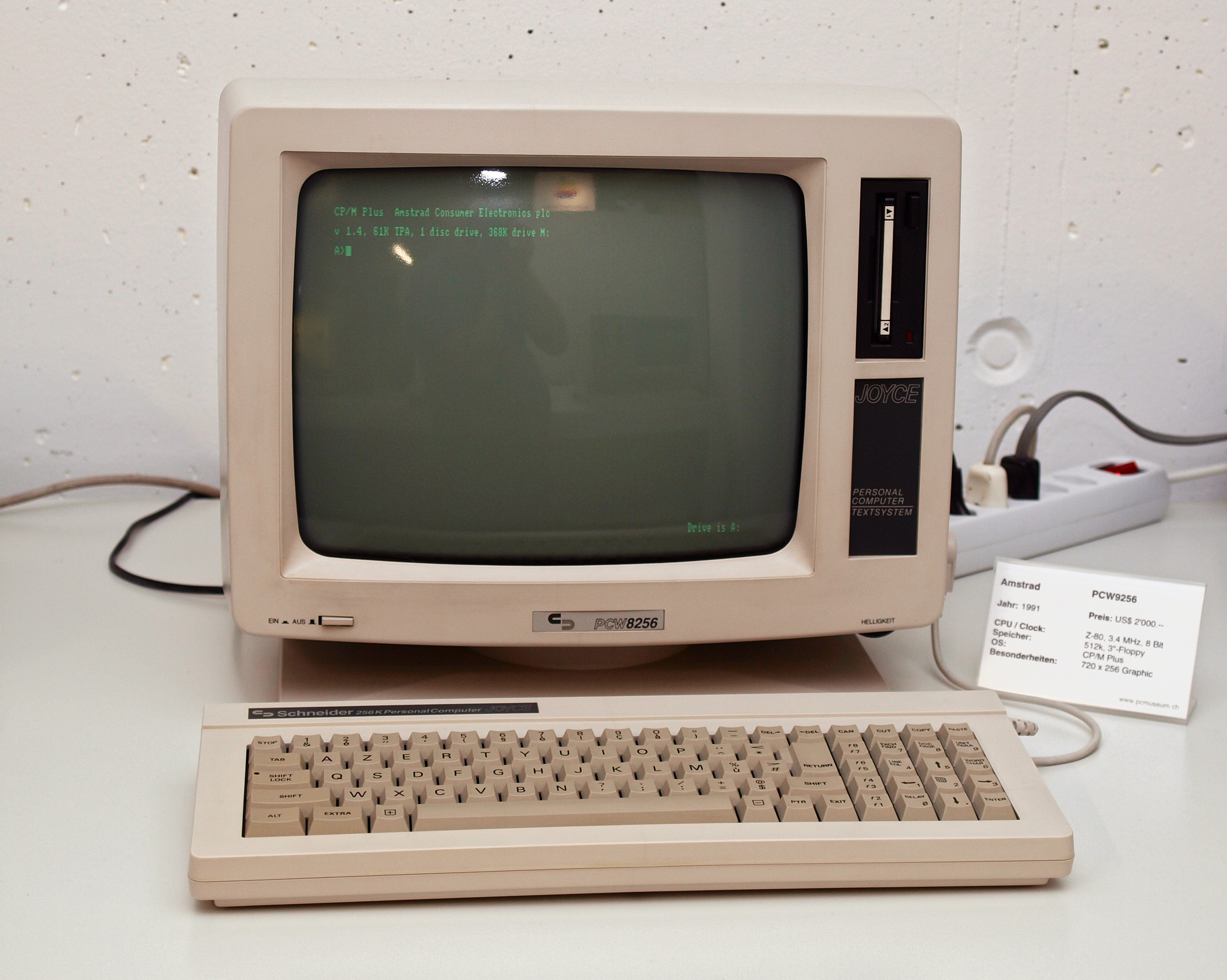
- PCW 8256
- Also known as: Joyce, Joyce Plus
- Type: Personal computer
- Released: September 1985; 41 years ago
- Operating system: CP/M Plus, Locoscript
- CPU: Z80 @ 4 MHz
- Memory: 256 KB (PCW 8256), 512 KB (PCW 8512)
- Removable storage: 3" floppy disk drives
- Display: 12" green monochrome monitor; 90 x 32 characters; 720 x 256; 720 x 200

The PCW 8256 was launched in September 1985 with 256 KB of RAM and one floppy disk drive. Launched a few months later, the PCW 8512 has 512 KB of RAM and two floppy disk drives. Both systems consist of three units: printer; keyboard; and monochrome CRT monitor whose casing includes the processor, memory, motherboard, one or two floppy disk drives, the power supply for all the units and the connectors for the printer and keyboard. The monitor displays green characters on a black background. It measures 12 inches (30 cm) diagonally, and shows 32 lines of 90 characters each. The designers preferred this to the usual personal computer display of 25 80-character lines, as the larger size would be more convenient for displaying a whole letter. The monitor can also display graphics for the bundled graphics program and for games.

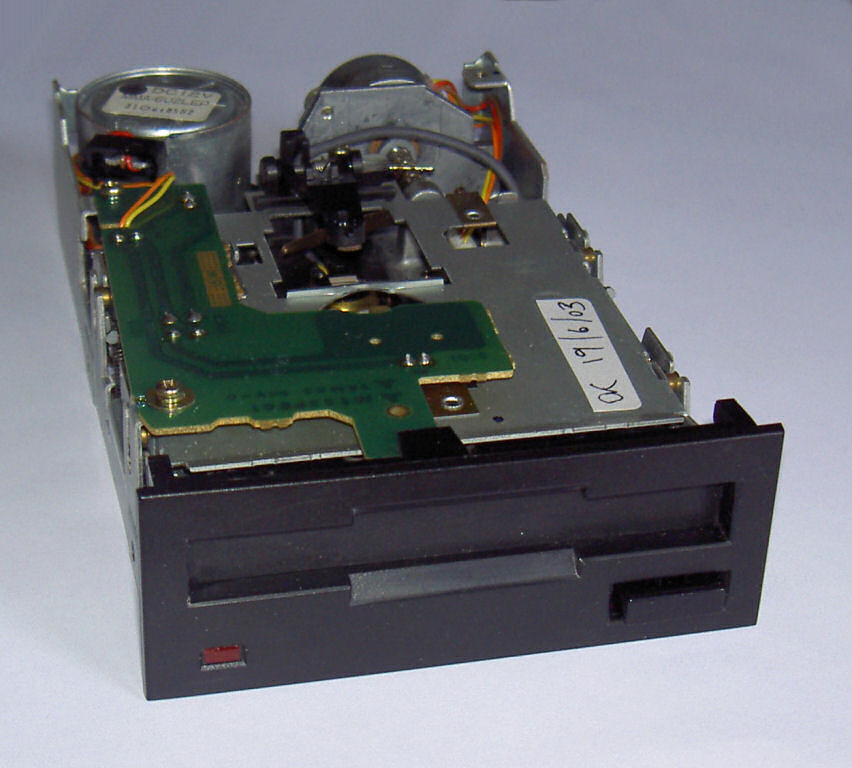
3-inch drive common on Amstrad machines

The floppy disk drives on these models are in the unusual 3-inch "compact floppy" format, which was selected as it has a simpler electrical interface than 3½-inch drives. In the range's early days supplies of 3-inch floppies occasionally ran out, but by 1988 the PCW's popularity encouraged suppliers to compete for this market. There are several techniques for transferring data from a PCW to an IBM-compatible PC, some of which also can transfer in the opposite direction, and service companies that will do the job for a fee. While all the 3-inch disks are double-sided, the PCW 8256's 3-inch drive and the PCW 8512's upper one were single-sided, while the 8512's lower one was double-sided and double-density. Hence there are two types of disk: Single-density, which could store 180 KB of data per side, equivalent to about 70 pages of text each; and double density, which can store twice as much per side. The double-density drive can read single-density disks, but it is inadvisable to write to them using this drive. Users of single-sided drives have to flip the disks over to use the full capacity.

The dot matrix printer has a sheet feed for short documents and a tractor feed for long reports on continuous stationery. It can print 90 characters per second at draft quality and 20 characters per second at higher quality, and can produce graphics. However it has only 9 printing pins and its higher quality does not match that of 24-pin printers. The dot matrix printer is not very robust as its chassis is made entirely of plastic. Users could buy a daisy-wheel printer or graph plotter from Amstrad. The daisy-wheel printer could not produce graphics.

The keyboard has 82 keys, some specific for word processing, especially with the bundled Locoscript software – for example to cut, copy, and paste. Non-English characters such as Greek can be typed by holding down the ALT or EXTRA key, along with the ⇧ Shift key if capitals were required. Other special key combinations activate caps lock, num lock, and reboot.

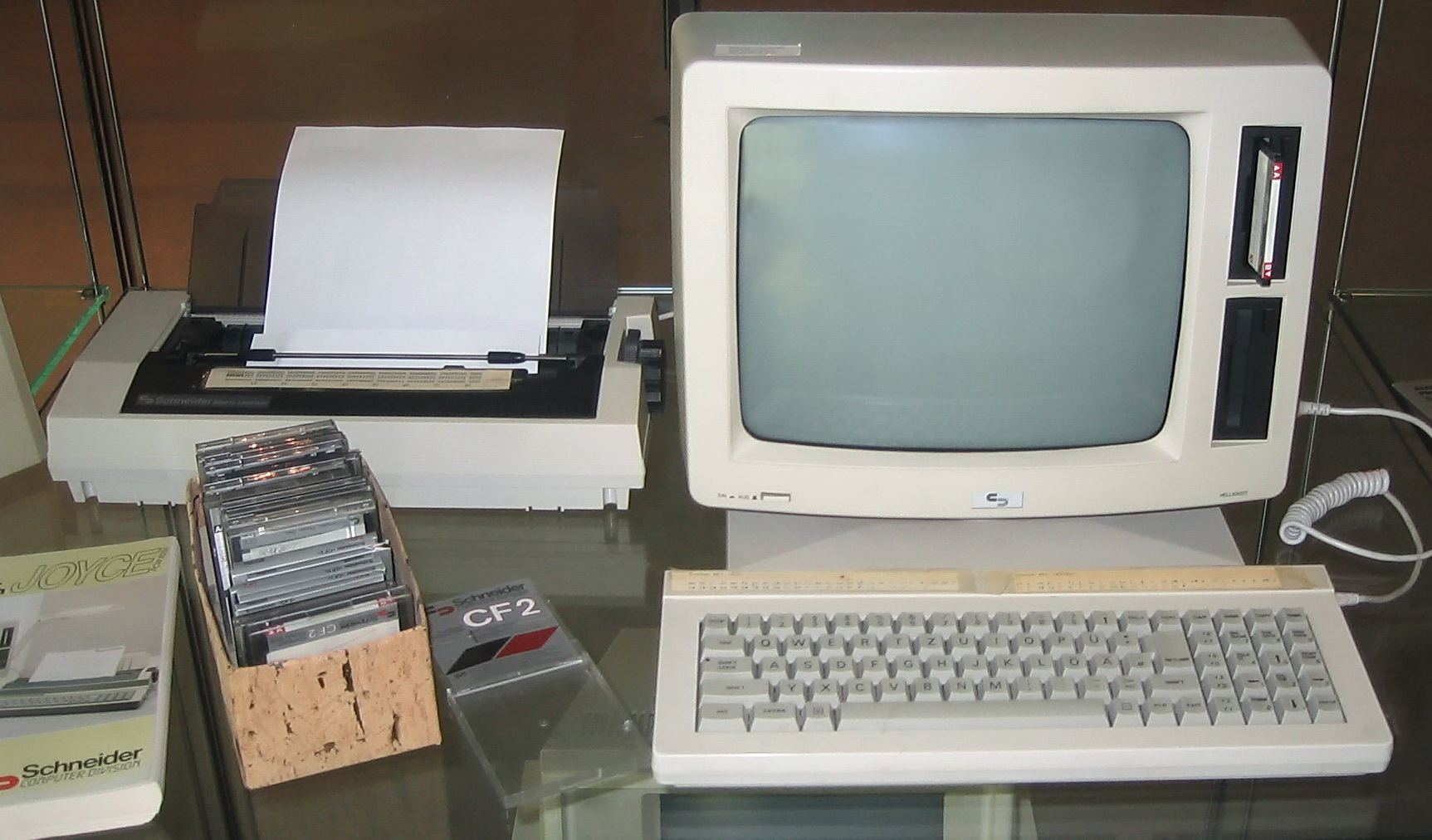
Schneider Joyce

A wide range of upgrades became available. The PCW 8256's RAM can be expanded to 512 KB for a hardware cost of about £50. An additional internal floppy disk drive for the 8256 cost about £100, and installation is not difficult. One can add external drives, for example if a 3½-inch drive is needed. GUI devices such as light pens, mice, and graphics tablets can be attached to the expansion socket at the back of the monitor. Adding a serial interface connector, which cost about £50, makes it possible to attach a modem or non-Amstrad printer.

The designs were licensed to the German consumer electronics company Schneider, which slightly modified their appearance and sold them as "Joyce" and "Joyce Plus". The partnership between Amstrad and Schneider was formed to market the Amstrad CPC range of computers, and ended when Amstrad launched the PCW9512.

=== PCW 9512 and 9256 ===
PCW 9512 and 9256
- Type: Personal computer
- Released: 1987; 39 years ago
- Discontinued: 1994; 32 years ago
- Operating system: CP/M Plus, Locoscript
- CPU: Z80 @ 4 MHz
- Memory: 512 KB (PCW 9512); 256 KB (PCW 9256)
- Removable storage: 3" (PCW 9512) and 3.5" (PCW 9512+ & PCW 9256) floppy disk drives
- Display: 12" monochrome monitor; 90 x 32 characters; 720 x 256
- Connectivity: Parallel port

The PCW 9512, introduced in 1987 at a price of £499 plus VAT, has a white-on-black screen instead of green-on-black, and the bundled printer is a daisy-wheel model instead of a dot-matrix printer. These models also have a parallel port, allowing non-Amstrad printers to be attached. The 9512 was also supplied with version 2 of Locoscript, including spellchecker and mail merge facilities. In all other respects the 9512's facilities are the same as the 8512's.

In 1991 the 9512 was replaced by the PCW 9256 and 9512+, both equipped with a single 3½-inch disk drive that can access 720 KB. The 9512+ has 512 KB of RAM, and two printer options, the Amstrad daisy-wheel unit and a series of considerably more expensive Canon inkjet printers: Initially the BJ10e, later the BJ10ex, and finally the BJ10sx. The 9256 has 256 KB of RAM and the same dot matrix printer as the 8256 and 8512, as well as the older Locoscript version 1.

=== PCW 10 ===
This is a PCW 9256 with 512 KB of RAM, a parallel printer port, and Locoscript 1.5 instead of Locoscript 1. The PCW 10 was not a success, and few were produced. By this time other systems offered much better print quality, and the PCW was a poor choice as a general-purpose computer, because of its slow speed and incompatibility with MS-DOS systems.

=== PcW16 ===
PcW16
- The PcW16's main screen
- Type: Personal computer
- Released: 1995; 31 years ago
- Operating system: Rosanne
- CPU: Z80 @ 16 MHz
- Memory: 1 MB RAM
- Storage: 1 MB flash memory
- Removable storage: 1.4 MB floppy drive
- Display: 640x480 monochrome
- Connectivity: Serial port, parallel port

This model, whose display labelled it "PcW16", was introduced in 1995 at a price of £299. Despite its name it is totally incompatible with all previous PCW systems. Instead of having two operating environments, LocoScript for word processing, and CP/M for other uses, it had its own GUI operating system, known as "Rosanne". This can only run one application at a time, and starting another application makes the previous one save all the files it had changed and then close. The bundled word processor was produced by Creative Technology, and can read LocoScript files but saves them in its own format. The package also included a spreadsheet, address book, diary, calculator and file manager. Amstrad never provided other applications, and very little third-party software was written for the machine.

The display unit, which also contains the processor, motherboard and RAM, is 640×480 pixels in size and works in VGA mode. The PcW16 included a standard 1.4 MB 3½-inch floppy drive. While competitors included hard disk drives with capacities of a few hundred MB to a few GB, the PcW16 uses a 1 MB flash memory to store the programs and user files. Like previous PCW models the PcW16 uses the 8-bit Z80 CPU, which first appeared in 1976, while contemporary personal computers use 16-bit or 32-bit CPUs. The price included a mouse for use with the GUI, but did not include a printer.

In a May 1996 PCW Plus magazine article Dave Langford criticized the PcW16: The operating system could not run the many CP/M programs available for previous PCW models; the flash RAM was too small for a large collection of programs, but programs could not be run from the floppy disk, which was designed for backing up files; and a second-hand IBM PC with LocosSript Pro looked like a more sensible upgrade path for users of earlier PCWs. Few PcW16s were sold.

== Software ==
This section covers the PCW 8xxx, 9xxx and 10 series; software for the PcW16 is described above.

=== Bundled ===
==== Locoscript word processor ====
LocoScript's file management screen on an Amstrad PCW

The word processing software LocoScript was included in the price of the hardware. The manual provides both a reference and a tutorial that enables users to start work within 20 minutes, and some users find the tutorial provided as much information as they ever need.

The program enables users to divide documents into groups, display the groups on a disk and then the documents in the selected group, and set up a template for each group. The "limbo file" facility enables users to recover accidentally deleted documents until the disk ran out of space, when the software permanently deletes files to make room for new ones.

Layout facilities includes setting and using tab stops, production of page headers and footers with automated page numbering, typographical effects including proportional spacing, a range of font sizes, and bold, italic and underline effects. The cut, copy and paste facility provides 10 paste buffers, each designated by a number, and these can be saved to a disk. The menu system has two layouts, one for beginners and the other for experienced users.

Locoscript supports 150 characters and, if used with the dot matrix printer, can print European letters including Greek and Cyrillic, as well as mathematical and technical symbols. The program allows the user to work on one document while printing another, so that the relative slowness of the basic printer seldom causes difficulties. Locoscript does not run under CP/M but is a self-booting disk. Users must reboot to switch between Locoscript and a CP/M application, unless they use a utility called "Flipper", which allocates separate areas of RAM to Locoscript and CP/M.

Locoscript version 1, bundled with the PCW 8256 and 8512, has no spell checker or mail merge facilities. Version 2, bundled with the PCW 9512, includes a spellchecker and can mail merge by interfacing to other products from Locomotive Software, such as LocoMail and LocoFile. Locoscript 2 also expanded the character set to 400.

==== CP/M operating system and applications ====
The PCW includes CP/M Plus. The operating system cannot address more than 64 KB of RAM. Since CP/M uses 3 KB, the most that CP/M applications can use is 61 KB. The rest of the RAM is used as a RAM disk (exposed under the drive letter "M:" for "memory"), which is much faster than a floppy disk but loses all its data when the machine was powered off. Locoscrip can use 154 KB as normal memory, and the rest as a RAM disk.

Mallard BASIC, like LocoScript, was a Locomotive Software product, but runs on CP/M. It lacks built-in graphics facilities, but includes JetSAM, an implementation of ISAM that supports multiple indexes per file, so that programs can access records directly by specifying values of key fields. The CP/M software bundle also includes DR Logo and a graphics program that can produce pie charts and bar charts.

=== Sold separately ===
Software vendors made a wide range of software available for the PCW:

- Alternative word processors include Superwriter and WordStar.
- Several spreadsheet programs became available, including SuperCalc II and Microsoft's Multiplan.
- Database programs adapted for the PCW include Sage Database, Cardbox, and dBase II.
- The MicroDesign, Desk Top Publisher, Newsdesk and Stop Press desktop publishing packages were used by groups of authors for newsletters.
- Sage Accounts and Payroll, and the Camsoft payroll and accounting software.
- Other programming languages, including C.
- Many games. Most are text adventures but there are also graphical games like Batman, Bounder, and Head over Heels.

=== Free software ===
Many free software can run under CP/M but require careful setting of options to run on the PCW series, although a significant number has installers that made this task easier. Programs already configured for the PCW cover a broad range of requirements including word processors, databases, graphics, personal accounts, programming languages, games, utilities, and a full-featured bulletin board system. Many of these are comparable to commercial offerings, but most had poor documentation.

== Technical design ==
The PCW 8256, 8512, 9512, 9256 and 9512+ share a common architecture. Other than the Z80 CPU, the PcW16 does not share any hardware with the original PCW series.

=== CPU ===
All PCW models, including the PcW16, use the Zilog Z80 range of CPUs. A 4 MHz Z80A was used in the 8256, 8512, 9512, 9256, 9512+ and PCW10; and a 16 MHz Z80 in the PCW16.

=== Memory ===
The Z80 can only access 64 KB of RAM at a time. Software can work around this by bank switching, accessing different banks of memory at different times, but this makes programming more complex and slows the system down. The PCW divides the Z80 memory map into four 16 KB banks. In CP/M, the memory used for the display is switched out while programs were running, giving more than 60 KB of usable RAM. While the Joyce architecture was designed with configurations of 128 KB and 256 KB of RAM in mind, no PCW was ever sold with 128 KB of RAM.

CP/M applications cannot use more than 64 KB so the system use the rest of the RAM for a RAM drive. On the other hand, LocoScript word processor program was reported as using up to 154 KB as normal memory and the rest as a RAM disk.

Unusually, the Z80 CPU in the PCW 8256, 8512, 9512, 9256, and 9512+ has no directly connected ROM, which most computers use to start booting. Instead, at startup, the ASIC (customised circuit) at the heart of the PCW provides access to part of the 1k ROM within the Intel 8041 microcontroller used to drive the printer. The Z80 copies 256 bytes via the ASIC into RAM, providing sufficient instructions to load the first disk sector from a floppy. The ROM-based code cannot display text, being too small to support character generation; instead, it displays a bright screen which is progressively filled by black stripes as the code is loaded from the floppy.

=== Printer ===
To make the printer cheap enough to be included with every PCW, Amstrad placed the majority of its drive electronics inside the PCW cabinet. The printer case contains only electromechanical components and high-current driver electronics; its power is via a coaxial power connector socket on the monitor casing. Rather than using a traditional Centronics port, pin and motor signals are connected directly by a 34-wire ribbon cable to an 8041 microcontroller on the PCW's mainboard. Software works with the printer via Epson emulation.

Most models of PCW were bundled with a 9-pin dot matrix printer mechanism, with the later 9512 and 9512+ models using a daisywheel (with a different cable; printers are not interchangeable with the dot matrix models). These PCW printers cannot be used on other computers, and the original PCW lacks a Centronics port. Instead, the Z80 bus and video signals are brought to an edge connector socket at the back of the cabinet. Many accessories including parallel and serial ports were produced for this interface. Some of the later models include a built-in parallel port; these could be bundled with either the dedicated Amstrad printer or a Canon Bubblejet model.

=== Video system ===
The PCW video system emulates a VT52 and was not designed for video games, although several graphical games exist. The display's addressable area is 90 columns and 32 lines with a resolution of 720 by 256 pixels. At 1 bit per pixel, this occupied 23 KB of RAM which is far too large for the Z80 CPU to scroll in software without ripple and tearing of the display. Instead, the PCW implements a Roller RAM consisting of a 512-byte area of RAM that holds the address of each line of display data. The screen can be scrolled either by changing the Roller RAM contents or by writing to an I/O port that set the starting point in Roller RAM for the screen data. This allows for very rapid scrolling. The video system also fetches data in a special order so that plotting a character eight scan lines high touches eight contiguous addresses. This meants that the Z80's concise block copy instructions, such as LDIR, can be used. Unfortunately, it also means that drawing lines and other shapes is very complicated.

== See also ==
- Amstrad CP/M Plus character set
- Amstrad CPC
- SymbOS
- List of Amstrad PCW games
- IBM Displaywriter System

== Emulators ==
- JOYCE PCW 8256/8512 emulator for Windows / Unix
- Joyce for Mac by Richard F. Bannister.
- CP/M Box PCW emulator for Windows, by Habisoft
- ZEsarUX 8-bit machines multi emulator, including PCW 8256/8512, for Linux, Mac and Windows, by César Hernández Bañó
