= Filmation (game engine) =

Video game graphics engine

Knight Lore, Ultimate Play the Game's first title to use the Filmation engine

Filmation is the name of the isometric graphics engine employed in a series of games developed by Ultimate Play the Game during the 1980s, primarily on the 8-bit ZX Spectrum platform, though various titles also appeared on the BBC Micro, Amstrad CPC, MSX and Commodore 64 platforms.

The original Filmation engine allowed the creation of 3D flip-screen environments and was designed to be used for platform-based arcade adventures. Player characters could move in four diagonal (from the player's perspective) directions, were able to jump over or onto obstacles, and could even push objects around the game environment.

== Precursors ==
Sandy White's Ant Attack used a similar isometric style to Ultimate's Filmation and Filmation II titles

A handful of games had used an isometric perspective before Filmation's first appearance in 1984, such as the arcade games Q*bert (1982) from Gottlieb, and Zaxxon (1982) and Congo Bongo (1983) from Sega, as well as the ZX Spectrum title Ant Attack (1983) by Sandy White. Q*bert and Zaxxon have little else in common with Filmation, though Ant Attack was a platform game of similar style, and was the first of these games to feature an extra degree of freedom (the ability to move up and down as well and north, south, east and west). It was claimed by White that Ant Attack was "the first true isometric 3D game".

== Development ==
When Filmation was introduced a year later, it featured far more complex graphics and environments than any isometric title yet, garnering Knight Lore much attention and critical acclaim. Ultimate Play the Game first described the engine in the Knight Lore manual thus:

KNIGHT LORE features filmation [sic] a unique process whereby you have complete freedom within the confines of your imagination, to do as you wish with any of the objects found within KNIGHT LORE

— Ultimate Play the Game, Knight Lore documentation

Knight Lore was followed three months later by Alien 8 and in 1986 by Pentagram. A second engine, Filmation II, was introduced in 1985 and used in two titles, Nightshade and Gunfright. This new version of the engine introduced large scrolling environments (much like Ant Attack's) rather than flip-screens. To avoid obscuring the player character, streets and buildings rendered by this engine would disappear to their outlines when the player character walked behind them, and the ability to flip the viewpoint through 180 degrees with a press of the Z key was introduced. Although Filmation II increased the graphical complexity of the titles that used it, the gameplay was simplified; the player was no longer able to jump (and indeed had no reason to) and was confined to essentially simpler environments, with no obstacles other than the buildings themselves. This simplification resulted in Nightshade and Gunfright being more straightforward shooter games than the puzzle based Filmation I titles.

Two later games, Martianoids and Bubbler, were developed by U.S. Gold (and published on the Ultimate Play the Game label) which also used scrolling 3D environments, though neither made explicit use of the Filmation II engine. Both had similarities to Filmation II, though Martianoids did not use a true isometric perspective and Bubbler had more in common with Atari Games' Marble Madness than previous Filmation titles.

Ultimate's final, unreleased title, Mire Mare, was long thought to have been Filmation-based, but in the late 1990s Rare revealed that it would actually have been more like the top-down Sabre Wulf, the first title based around the Sabreman character.

== Games ==
Filmation

- Knight Lore (1984)
- Alien 8 (1985)
- Pentagram (1986)

Filmation II

- Nightshade (1985)
- Gunfright (1986)

Miscellaneous

- Martianoids (1987)
- Bubbler (1987)

== Legacy ==
Batman by Ocean Software

The Filmation style was extremely influential in the period immediately following the release of Knight Lore and Alien 8, and it was copied extensively by other publishers in titles such as Fairlight, The Great Escape, Batman, M.O.V.I.E., Head Over Heels and Solstice. Later, Rare, the company that Ultimate Play the Game evolved into, reprised the style themselves with their releases Snake Rattle 'n' Roll (NES and Sega Mega Drive) and Monster Max (Game Boy; written by Bernie Drummond and Jon Ritman, the authors of the aforementioned Batman and Head Over Heels). Cadaver by the Bitmap Brothers, released on the Amiga and Atari ST in 1990, bore striking similarities to Knight Lore, and even named the game's location "Castle Wulf" after Knight Lore's precedent game, Sabre Wulf.
