= Unfinished creative work =

Creative work that has not been completed

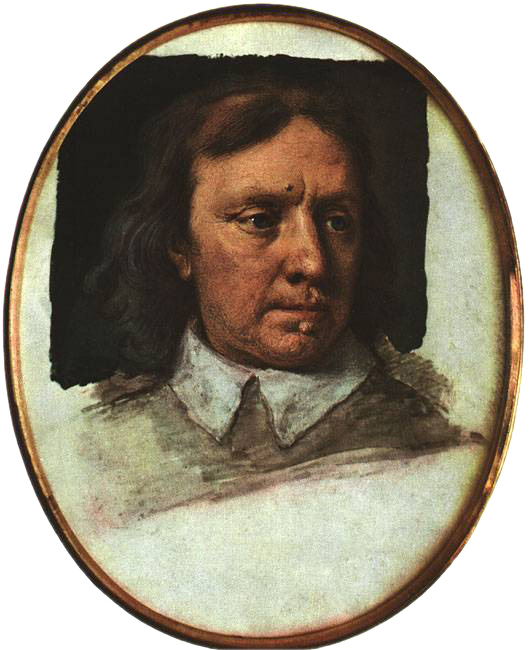
An unfinished portrait miniature of Oliver Cromwell by Samuel Cooper

An unfinished creative work is a painting, novel, musical composition, or other creative work, that has not been brought to a completed state. Its creator may have chosen not to finish it, deferred its completion indefinitely, or may have been prevented from doing so by circumstances beyond their control, such as indignation, illness, or death. Such pieces are often the subject of speculation as to what the finished piece would have been like had the creator completed the work. Sometimes artworks are finished by others and released posthumously. Unfinished works have had profound influences on their genres and have inspired others in their own projects. The term can also refer to ongoing work which could eventually be finished (i.e. the creator is still living) and is distinguishable from "incomplete work", which can be a work that was finished but is no longer in its complete form.

There are many reasons that a work is not completed. Works are usually stopped when their creator dies, although some, aware of their failing health, make sure that they set up the project for completion. If the work involves other people, such as a cast of actors or the subject of a portrait, it may be halted because of their unavailability. Projects that are too grandiose might never have been finished, while others should be feasible but their creator's continual unhappiness with them leads to abandonment.

Unfinished works by popular authors and artists may still be made public, sometimes in the state they were in when work was halted. Alternatively, another artist may finish the piece. In some fields work may appear unfinished, but is actually finished, such as Donatello's "non finito" technique in sculpture.

== Media ==
=== Literature ===
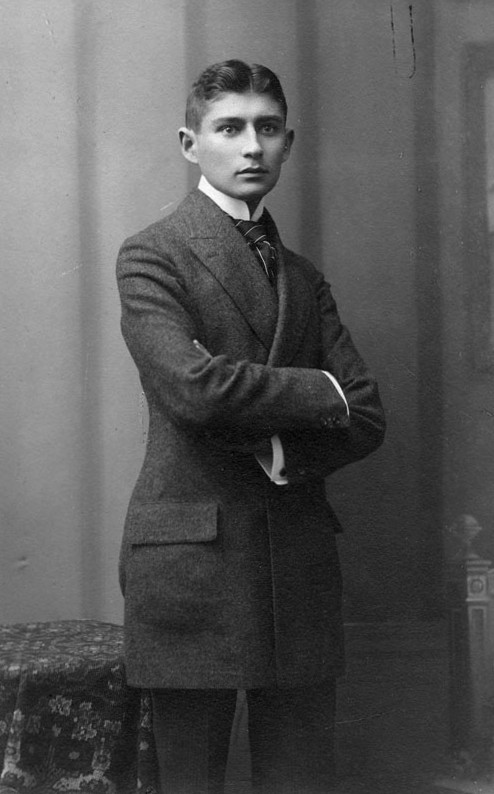
Franz Kafka's unfinished works were released after his death despite his wishes for them to be burned.

Many acclaimed authors have left work incomplete. Some such pieces have been published posthumously, either in their incomplete state or after being finished by somebody else.

It is the job of literary executors to take charge of the work of a writer after the writer's death. They must often decide what to do with incomplete work, using their own judgement if not given explicit instructions. In some cases, this can lead to something happening to the work that was not originally intended, such as the release of Franz Kafka's unfinished writings by Max Brod when Kafka had wished for them to be destroyed. These works have become iconic in Western literature. The posthumous publication of some of Ernest Hemingway's unfinished novels was met with controversy. Several books were published, but it has been suggested that it is not within the jurisdiction of Hemingway's relatives or publishers to determine whether these works should be made available to the public. For example, scholars often disapprovingly note that the version of The Garden of Eden published by Charles Scribner's Sons in 1986, though not a revision of Hemingway's original words, nonetheless omits two-thirds of the original manuscript.

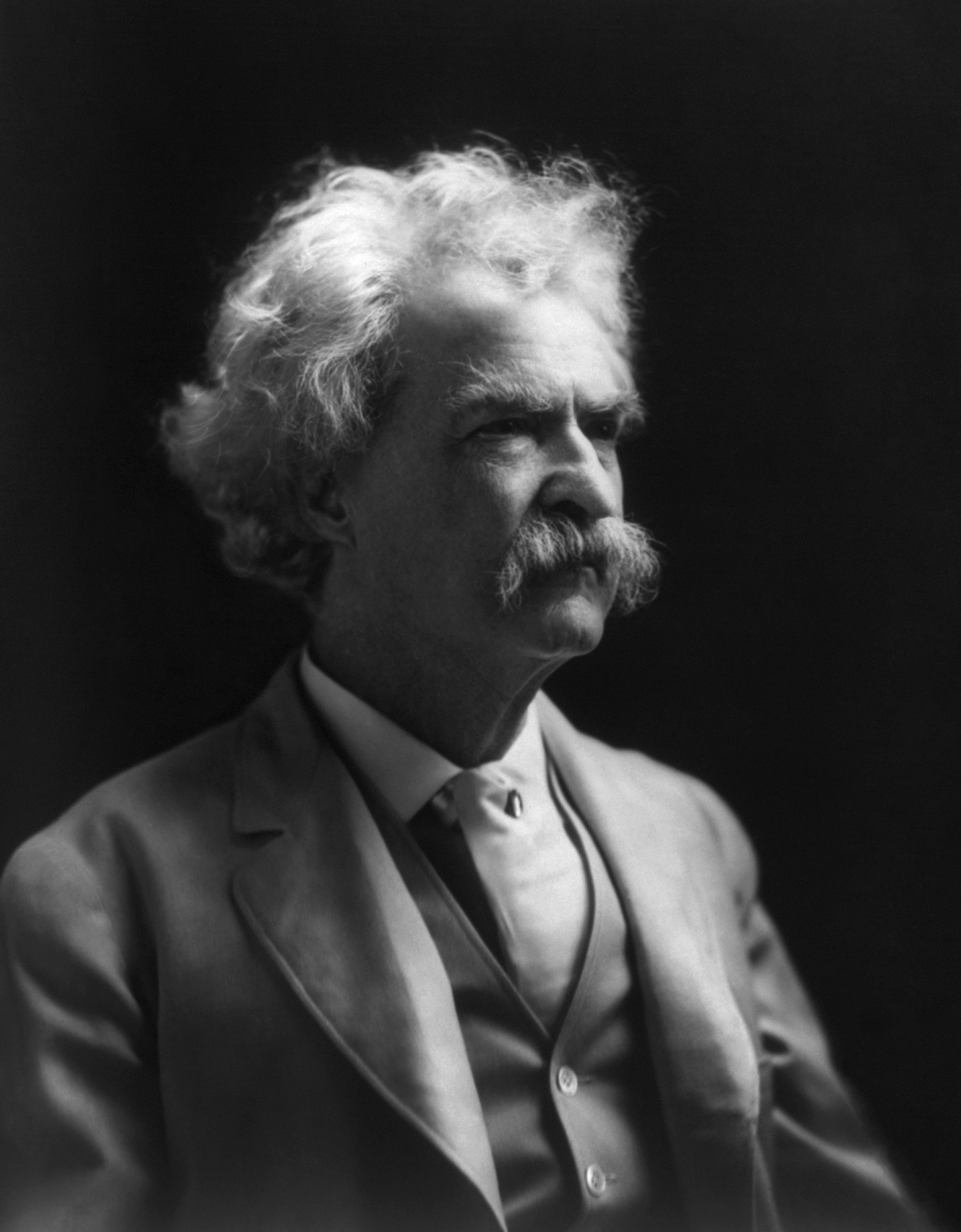
Mark Twain took years to write three versions of The Mysterious Stranger but he did not finish any of the works, causing the problem to the unfinished mystery.

Novels can remain unfinished because the author continually rewrites the story. When enough material exists, someone else can compile and combine the work, creating a finished story from several different drafts. Mark Twain's The Mysterious Stranger was written in three different versions over a period of 11 years, none of which were completed. Twain biographer and literary executor Albert Paine combined the stories and published his version six years after Twain's death. Similarly, J. R. R. Tolkien continuously rewrote The Silmarillion throughout his lifetime; a definitive version was still uncompiled at the time of his death, with some sections very fragmented. His son, Christopher Tolkien, invited fantasy fiction writer Guy Gavriel Kay to reconstruct some parts of the book, and they eventually published a final version in 1977. In 1980, Christopher Tolkien published another posthumous collection of his father's unfinished work, appropriately entitled Unfinished Tales. Between 1982 and 1996, he published twelve volumes of The History of Middle-earth, a substantial portion of which is unfinished and incomplete drafts. In 2007, Christopher Tolkien published another novel from his father entitled The Children of Húrin. Like The Silmarillion, Christopher assembled the novel from various incomplete drafts.

The size of a project can be such that a piece of literature is never finished. Geoffrey Chaucer never completed The Canterbury Tales to the extensive length that he originally intended. Chaucer had, however, already written much of the work at the time of his death, and the Canterbury Tales are considered to be a seminal work despite the unfinished status. English poet Edmund Spenser originally intended The Faerie Queene to consist of 12 books; even at its unfinished state—6 books were published before Spenser's death—it is the longest epic poem in the English language. Honoré de Balzac, the French novelist, completed nearly 100 pieces for his novel sequence La Comédie humaine, but a planned 48 more were never finished. Notes and plot outlines left behind by an author may allow a successor to complete a novel or series of novels. Frank Herbert left behind extensive notes related to his Dune universe, which led to son Brian Herbert and science fiction author Kevin J. Anderson's completing several prequels to the popular series. Mervyn Peake, author of the Gormenghast novels, meant to write a complete biography of the main character, Titus, but died after only completing three books in the series. (His notes for a fourth novel were compiled into the book Titus Awakes by Peake's widow.) The Familiar, a book series written by Mark Z. Danielewski and ambitiously planned to span 27 installments that are each over 800 pages long with interlocking characters and stories, prematurely stopped at less than 20% complete after the fifth volume, Redwood, in 2018, when poor sales forced its publisher, Pantheon Books, to drop support for it. Another famous example of an unfinished book series is George R. R. Martin's dark epic high fantasy series A Song of Ice and Fire, which was planned to comprise seven books, but only five have been published as of 2024, the sixth book, The Winds of Winter, which Martin began writing circa 2010 still being incomplete. When the series' television adaptation, Game of Thrones, finished adapting the first five books over the course of five seasons while Winds was incomplete, Martin was able to give the series showrunners an outline on what Winds' story was meant to be like, so that they could continue the series uninterrupted and mix in some original content instead of disappointing fans with a delay of the final seasons of the series.

Some works are presented as separate sections, each written at different times. This can lead to a piece appearing complete while the author actually intended for it to continue, or where other authors try to fake their own writing as part of the work. The first four cantos of Lord Byron's narrative poem Don Juan were written in 1818 and 1819, with a further twelve completed and published before his death in 1824. Numerous "continuations" of the story had been published by various publishing houses even between issues of the story, along with several fake conclusions. Byron had intended to continue the story, as evidenced by the find of the 17th canto after his death, but it is not clear how long the poem would continue or how it would conclude. It is still regarded as one of his greatest achievements. Charles Dickens was writing The Mystery of Edwin Drood in monthly installments when he died, completing just six of the twelve intended. The story surrounded the murder of the titular Edwin Drood; because the story was never finished, the murderer was never revealed. The book was still made into a film and a musical, with the latter having the unusual concept that the audience members vote for who they think is the murderer.

Other famous unfinished works of literature include Hero and Leander by Christopher Marlowe (a completion was provided by George Chapman), Dream of the Red Chamber by Gao E (Chapter 80–120), Dead Souls by Nikolai Gogol, Bouvard et Pécuchet by Gustave Flaubert, Weir of Hermiston by Robert Louis Stevenson, The Living Corpse by Leo Tolstoy, The Good Soldier Švejk by Jaroslav Hašek, Suite française by Irène Némirovsky, Answered Prayers by Truman Capote, The Last Tycoon by F. Scott Fitzgerald, Messias by Väinö Linna, Uncertain Times by Richard Yates, Sanditon by Jane Austen, Mount Analogue by René Daumal, The Pale King by David Foster Wallace, The Final Unfinished Voyage of Jack Aubrey by Patrick O'Brian, Georg Büchner's Woyzeck, The Castle and Amerika by Franz Kafka, The Life of Klim Samgin by Maxim Gorky, The Man Without Qualities by Robert Musil and Le Premier Homme by Albert Camus.

==== Science, theology and philosophy ====
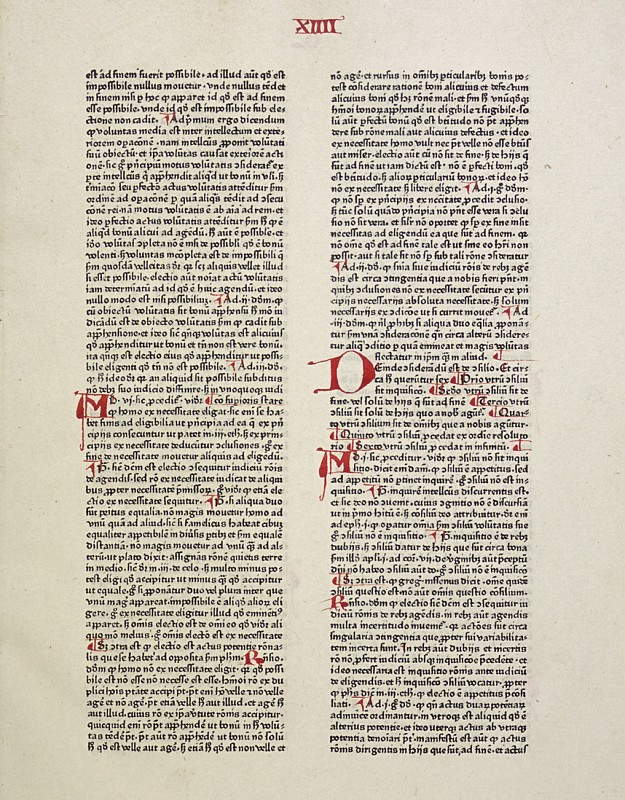
St. Thomas Aquinas stopped work on his Summa Theologiae in 1273 after a mystical experience.

Religious works have also been left incomplete, leading to debates about the possible missing content. Some theologians consider the Gospel of Mark, in its existing form, incomplete; the text after 16:8 is probably not original, thus creating speculation whether the author was arrested or died suddenly, or whether the end of the gospel could have broken away from the rest of the gospel as it was handed to the next person. The Sunni Islamic classic Qur'anic commentary, Mafatihu-l-Ghayb, better known as Tafseer Al-Kabeer (Tafsir al-Kabir (al-Razi)) by Fakhr al-Din al-Razi was left unfinished and it was finished by either Qadi Shahab-ud-deen bin Khaleel al-Khauli, of Damascus (died 639 AH) or Shaikh Najm-ud-deen Ahmad bin Al-Qamooli (died 777 AH) as mentioned in Kashf-az-Zunoon. The Masnavi, the most famous poem in Sunni Islamic Sufi poetry by Rumi was left unfinished and it was later finished by Mufti Ilahi Baksh Kandhlawi about five hundred years after the demise of Rumi. The Persian Bayán, a scripture from Bábism, was left unfinished when the Báb died. There have been some claims that the text has been completed by other people, though the Báb stated that it would be finished by [him] whom God shall make manifest. St. Thomas Aquinas abandoned his great work the Summa Theologica in 1273, citing a mystical experience during Mass. Its arguments for the existence of God continue to exert influence in philosophy and Christian theology more than 700 years later. In Greek philosophy, Plato's Critias was unfinished when Plato died at age 80.

The most influential document in computer science was John von Neumann's First Draft of a Report on the EDVAC, a 101-page manuscript dating from 1946 and littered with ellipses and spaces for the eventual addition of further material. Von Neumann never completed it, as by that time its distribution had already influenced an explosion in postwar computer development. Its elaboration of the stored program concept and formalization of the logical design of computer architecture—ideas which were not all original to von Neumann but which he first expressed in the mathematical language he favoured—endure in the architectures of modern computer systems.

Still in computer science, the seminal work on algorithms, The Art of Computer Programming by Donald Knuth, has had only the first four of its seven planned volumes written.

The first genuine historiographical work, the History of the Peloponnesian War by Thucydides, was undergoing a major revision by the author at the time of his death, so different sections of it reflect a starkly contrasting general outlook on Persian influence in the events depicted.

=== Drawings, paintings and sculptures ===
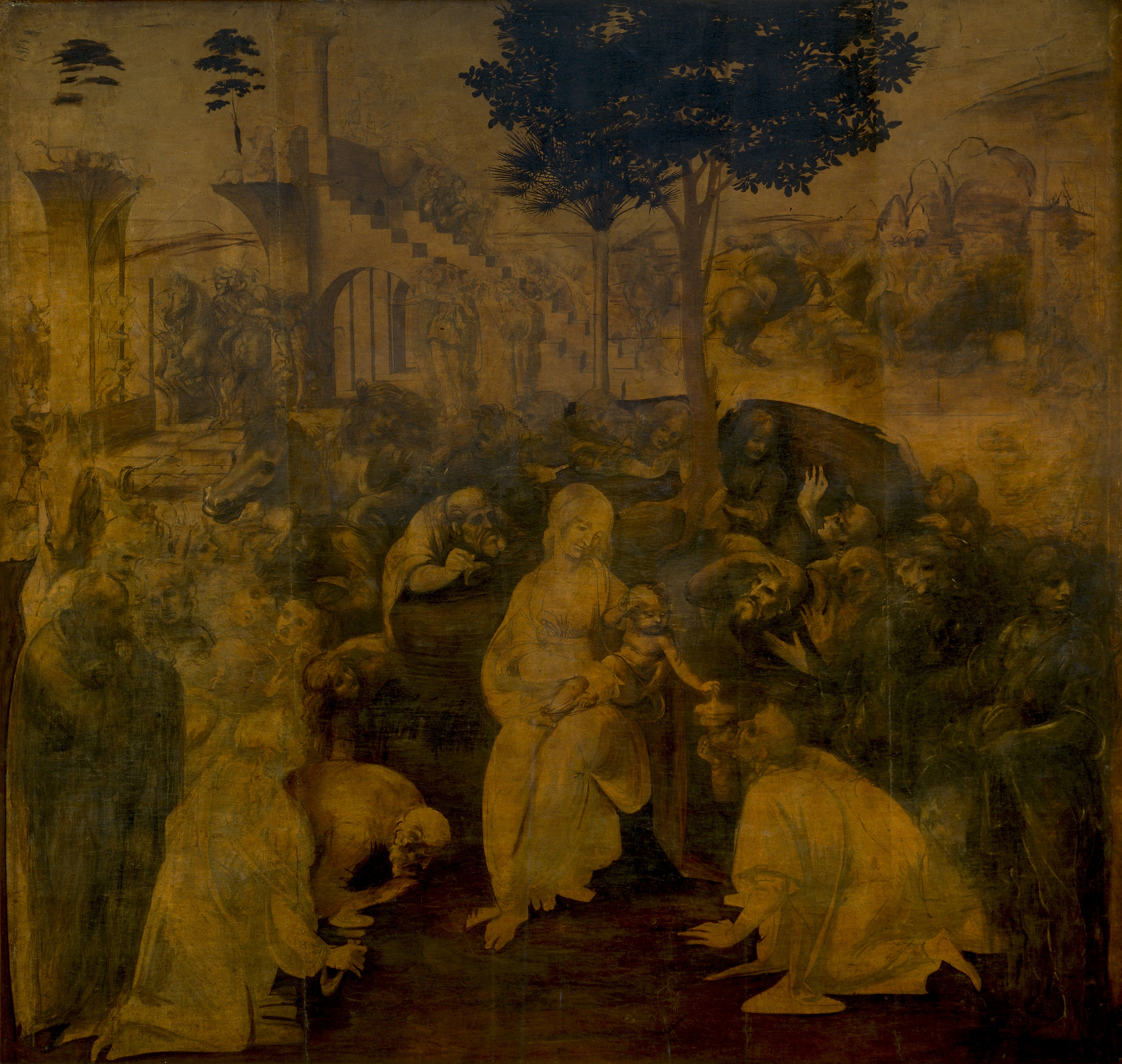
Adoration of the Magi, an unfinished painting by Leonardo da Vinci.

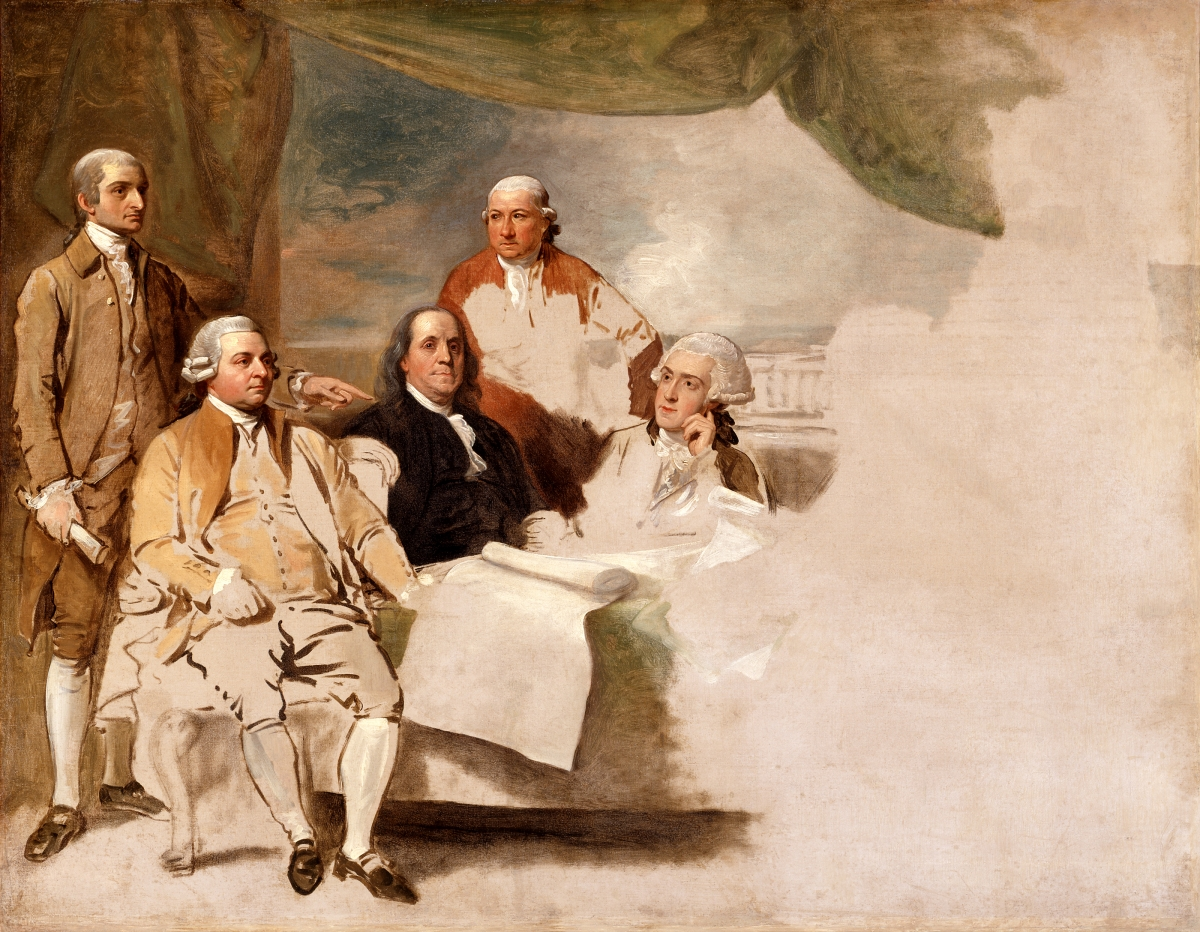
Treaty of Paris, Benjamin West's 1783–84 painting of the American delegates to the 1783 Treaty of Paris, which ended the American Revolutionary War, left out the members of the British delegation, who refused to pose out of shame for their country's defeat. The portrait was never finished.

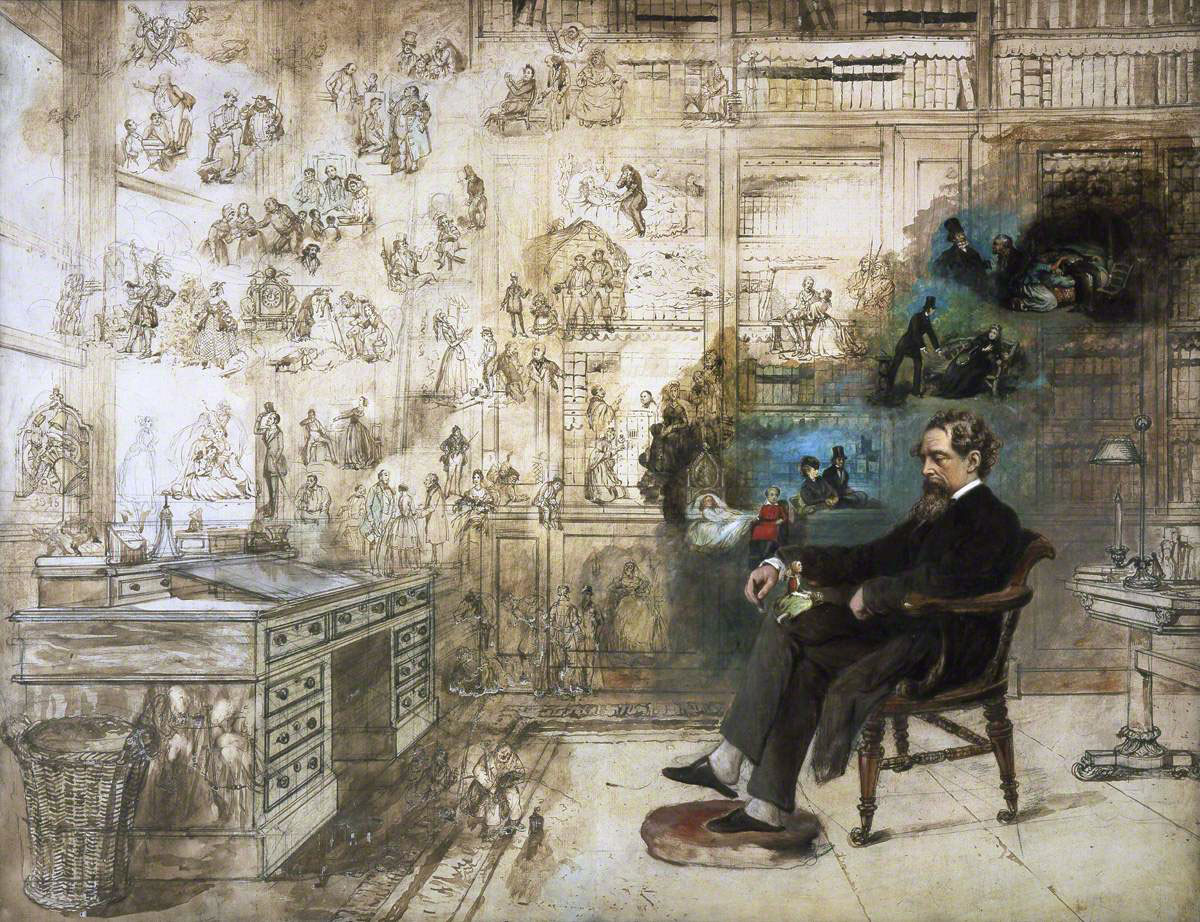
Dickens' Dream, by Robert William Buss, begun on the death of Charles Dickens in 1870, and incomplete at the time of the painter's death in 1875.

Artists leave behind incomplete work for a variety of reasons. A piece may not be completed if the subject becomes unavailable, such as in the changing of a landscape or the death of a person being painted. Elizabeth Shoumatoff's unfinished portrait of 32nd U.S. president Franklin D. Roosevelt was started around noon on 12 April 1945 but left unfinished when Roosevelt died later that day. In other instances, outside circumstances can prevent the execution of an otherwise "finished" artwork: Leonardo da Vinci developed sketches and models for the 24-foot-tall (7.3 m) "Gran Cavallo" horse statue but the bronze to cast the sculpture was diverted to make cannons. Five hundred years later, two full-size sculptures were completed based on Leonardo's work. Technically his The Last Supper is unfinished. In most pictures it shows a roof, but at Milan, where the painting lies, it shows some Latin that is half done. Robert William Buss left unfinished his most famous painting, Dickens' Dream, just as Charles Dickens himself had left a novel half-complete at his death.

Depending on the medium involved, it can be difficult for another artist to complete an unfinished artwork without damaging it. Some artists completed the paintings of their mentors, such as Giulio Romano is believed to have done on Raphael's Transfiguration, and Titian on Giorgione's Sleeping Venus.

Instead of completing another artist's masterpiece, particularly when many years have passed, unfinished works frequently inspire others to create their own version. Michelangelo left several unfinished sculptures and paintings, with sketches and partially completed paintings inspiring others. If the work is to be done on commission but is not finished it is commonly passed on to another artist. Leonardo da Vinci's work on the Adoration of the Magi for the monastery of San Donato was halted when he left Florence for Milan. Still requiring an altarpiece, the monks employed Filippino Lippi to create one. Both paintings now hang in the Uffizi gallery.

Paintings are usually sketched on the canvas before work begins, and sculptures are frequently planned using a maquette. These works-in-progress can be as sought after as (or even more sought after than) completed works by highly regarded artists because they help reveal the process of creating a work of art. Gian Lorenzo Bernini, a sculptor from the Baroque period, made his bozzetti (an Italian term for the prototype sculpture) from wax or baked terracotta to show those that had commissioned him how the final piece was intended to look. Eleven of these bozzetti were displayed in an exhibition at the Art Institute of Chicago in 2004. Some museums specialise in collections of maquettes, such as the Museo dei Bozzetti in Pietrasanta, Italy.

During the Renaissance, Donatello made sculptures that appeared unfinished by only sculpting part of the block, leaving the figure appearing to be stuck within the material. He called this technique "non finito", and it has been used by several artists since then.

In the age of mass media, incomplete work can reach an audience due to sheer demand for material by the artist. Tintin and Alph-Art, the 24th comic in Hergé's popular The Adventures of Tintin series, was unfinished at his death. Though he had illustrated a significant part of the book, several sketched panels remained in the final scenes, with no clear outline for the last third of the story. The book was still published and the story can be followed despite the incomplete artwork.

=== Architecture, construction and engineering ===
Many construction or engineering projects have remained unfinished at various stages of development. The work may be finished as a blueprint or whiteprint and never be realised, or be abandoned during construction.

There are numerous unfinished buildings that remain partially constructed in countries around the world, some of which can be used in their incomplete state, while others remain as mere shells. An example of the latter is the Ryugyong Hotel in North Korea. If finished, it would become the tallest hotel in the world and the seventh largest building but is uninhabitable and will not be completed due to the cost and the poor structural integrity. Some projects are intentionally left with an unfinished appearance, particularly the follies of the late 16th to 18th century.

There are many reasons for construction works being halted. Amongst others, they include a changing financial climate, unforeseen structural weaknesses, and a dramatic shift in the politics of a country. Work on the Palace of Soviets, a project to construct the world's largest building in Moscow, was halted when the city was attacked during World War II.

Some buildings are in a cycle of near-perpetual construction, with work lasting for decades or even centuries. Antoni Gaudí's Sagrada Família in Barcelona has been under construction since 1882. Work was delayed by the Spanish Civil War, during which part of the original models were destroyed. After the restoration of these models, the works are still in progress and the prevision is that the building will be finished in 2026. Today, even with portions of the basilica incomplete, it is still the most popular tourist destination in Barcelona with 1.5 million visitors every year. Gaudí spent 40 years of his life overseeing the project and is buried in the crypt. Also in Barcelona, construction on the Barcelona Cathedral started in 1298, but its dome and central tower were only finished in 1913, 615 years later. Germany's Cologne Cathedral took even longer to complete, from 1248 to 1880, a total of 632 years.

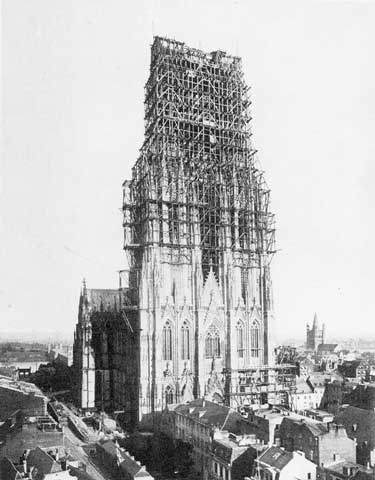
Construction of Cologne Cathedral took over 600 years.

It is not only buildings that have failed during the construction phase. In the 1920s, the White Star Line hired the shipbuilders Harland and Wolff to build the first 1,000-foot-long (300 m) ocean liner, with the planned name of Oceanic. However, a dispute between the companies halted the construction, then the Great Depression put an end to it; eventually the portion of the keel already constructed was broken up and used in building two smaller but similar ships, the MV Britannic and MV Georgic. In the 1970s the Hoan Bridge in Milwaukee, Wisconsin was out of use for five years after its construction when the connecting roads were not completed. In the 1980s, during the Iran–Iraq War, Iraqi president Saddam Hussein commissioned the Babylon project. The supergun design by Gerald Bull was never fully constructed after Bull's assassination in March 1990.

Many projects do not get to the construction phase and are halted during or after planning. Ludwig II of Bavaria commissioned several designs for Castle Falkenstein, with the fourth plan being vastly different from the first. The first two designs were turned down, one because of costs and one because the design displeased Ludwig, and the third designer withdrew from the project. The fourth and final plan was completed and some infrastructure was prepared for the site, but Ludwig died before construction work began. The Palace of Whitehall, at the time the largest palace in Europe, was mostly destroyed by a fire in 1698. Sir Christopher Wren, most famous for his role in rebuilding several churches after the Great Fire of London in 1666, sketched a proposed replacement for a part of the palace, but financial constraints prevented construction.

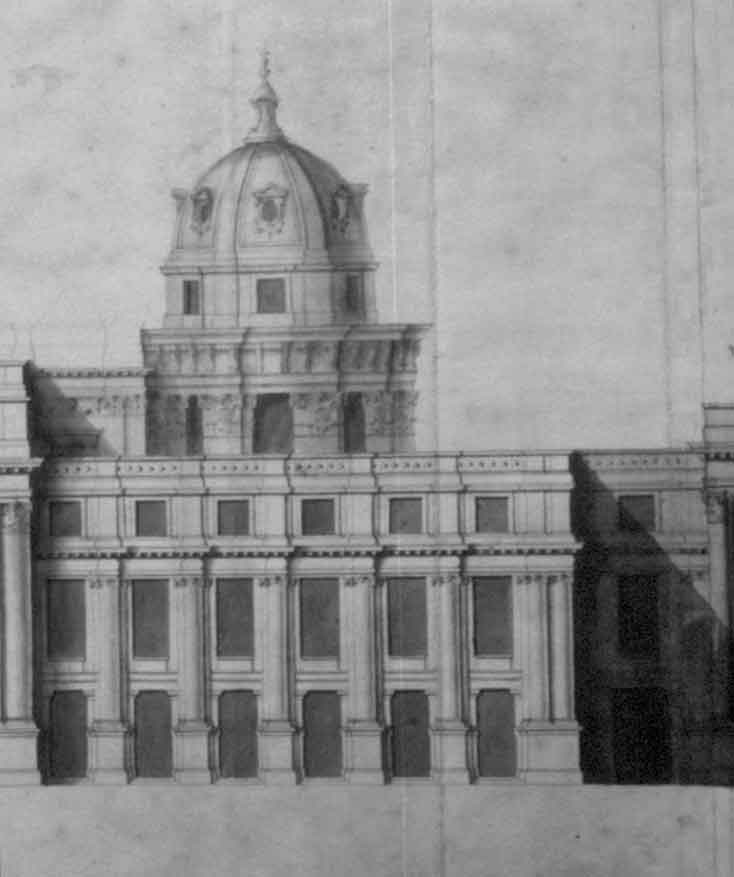
Sir Christopher Wren's 1698 sketch for a rebuilt Palace of Whitehall.

Computer technology has allowed for 3D representations of projects to be shown before they are built. In some cases the construction is never started and the computer model is the nearest that anyone can ever get to seeing the finished piece. For example, in 1999 Kent Larson's exhibition "Unbuilt Ruins: Digital Interpretations of Eight Projects by Louis I. Kahn" showed computer images of designs completed by noted architect Louis Kahn but never built. Computer simulations can also be used to create prototypes of engineering projects and test them before they are actually made; this has allowed the design process to be more successful and efficient.

Even without being constructed, many architectural designs and ideas have had a lasting influence. The Russian constructivism movement started in 1913 and was taught in the Bauhaus and other architecture schools, leading to numerous architects integrating it into their style.

=== Music ===
==== Classical music ====
Before the advent of recording technology, all musical compositions were sketched on manuscripts. Often these manuscripts are roughly sketched, with drafting work scribbled over the top of the music, and have been found in unordered piles. Many unfinished symphonies have been pieced together from these original manuscripts by other composers, after the original author's death, with some remaining incomplete until many decades later. One of the most famous examples of unfinished musical compositions is Franz Schubert's Symphony No. 8 in B minor, or as it is more commonly known, The Unfinished Symphony. Another famous unfinished classical piece is Mozart's Requiem, famous in part because of the numerous myths and legends that surround its creation and in part because of Mozart's prestige. At the time of his death, Mozart had fully orchestrated only the first movement, leaving nine further movements in varying states of completion. Franz Xaver Süssmayr, an acquaintance of Mozart, finished the nine incomplete movements and wrote four more. In addition to the Süssmayr version, a number of alternative completions have been developed by composers and musicologists in the 20th and 21st centuries. Gustav Mahler's Symphony No. 10 was incomplete, with only drafts, sketches, and two mostly orchestrated movements existing at the composer's death. Several people have "completed" it with varying degrees of success, the most notable of these being Deryck Cooke's "performing version of the draft."

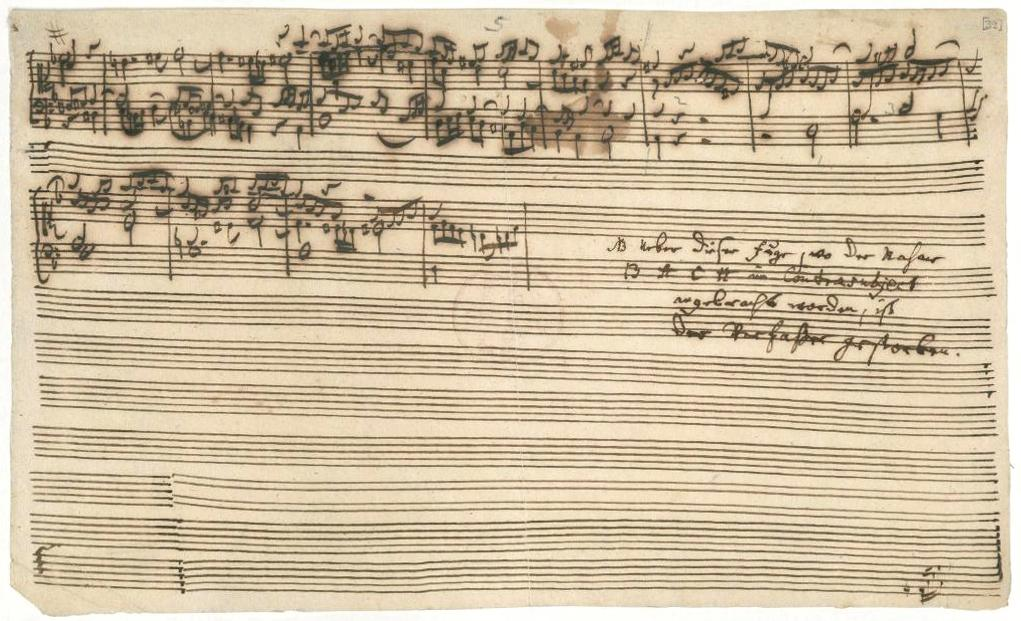
J. S. Bach's The Art of Fugue breaks off abruptly during Contrapunctus XIV.

Some compositions are finished "in the style of" the original composer, with someone who is highly familiar with the work adopting the same writing style and continuing the musical tone. Johann Sebastian Bach's The Art of Fugue, which was broken off abruptly during Contrapunctus XIV, probably shortly before the death of the composer, was first published in the mid-18th century. Many reconstructions have been written, but in 1991 Zoltán Göncz used the form of a permutation fugue to make a strong argument as to the structure of the Fugue to come. (See external links.) Sir Edward Elgar was composing a Symphony No. 3 at the time of his death and left 130 pages of sketches. These sketches were put into a reasonable order, orchestrated in the style of Elgar, and elaborated by Anthony Payne. Payne's reconstruction has been played numerous times to great acclaim.

Some works, deemed complete by the composer, are nonetheless augmented for non-musical reasons. In May 2000 composer Colin Matthews premiered his "completion" of Gustav Holst's The Planets, whereby he composed a new movement for the ninth planet Pluto, giving it the name "Pluto, The Renewer". When Holst had written the original piece Pluto had not been discovered, and this addition therefore updated the suite to represent all known planets of the Solar System (Earth was never included), 82 years after it was originally performed. In August 2006 Pluto was officially demoted to a dwarf planet, meaning that Holst's original work now more accurately represents the Solar System.

Some very famous 20th century operas have been left incomplete at their composers' deaths. Giacomo Puccini left the finale of Turandot unfinished and the missing music had to be provided by Franco Alfano for the premiere in 1926. Recently, Luciano Berio composed an alternative ending. Alban Berg had not yet finished orchestrating the third and final act of his opera Lulu at the time of his death in 1935. Due to objections from his widow, it was not until 1979 that a full version was performed, with the orchestration for Act 3 being completed by Friedrich Cerha using Berg's sketches.

Other musical works which are unfinished but performable, are simply given in their incomplete state. Schubert's symphony is the most famous, but Anton Bruckner's Ninth Symphony is performed without a finale, and in Karl Amadeus Hartmann's Gesangsszene, the final words of Jean Giraudoux's text, left unset at the composer's death, are simply spoken by the soloist.

Some other well-known examples of unfinished works completed by other hands include:

- Béla Bartók's Viola Concerto, completed by Tibor Serly and others.
- Ludwig van Beethoven's Symphony No. 10, completed by Barry Cooper.
- Alexander Borodin's opera Prince Igor, completed by Nikolai Rimsky-Korsakov and Alexander Glazunov.
- Ferruccio Busoni's opera Doktor Faust, completed in distinct versions by Philipp Jarnach and Antony Beaumont.
- Ernest Chausson's String Quartet, completed by Vincent d'Indy.
- Claude Debussy's fragment La chute du Maison Usher was realized three times, by Carolyn Abbate, Juan Allende-Blin and Julian Grant, and completed by Robert Orledge, using other extant music by Debussy.
- Claude Debussy's opera Rodrigue et Chimène, completed by Edison Denisov.
- Léo Delibes' opera Kassya, completed by Jules Massenet.
- Gaetano Donizetti's opera Le duc d'Albe, completed by Matteo Salvi.
- Duke Ellington's opera Queenie Pie, completed by John A. Williams and Leslie Burrs.
- Manuel de Falla's opera Atlántida, completed by Ernesto Halffter.
- Fromental Halévy's opera Noé, completed by Georges Bizet.
- Charles Ives' Universe Symphony, completed by various composers, including Larry Austin.
- Wolfgang Amadeus Mozart's Great Mass in C minor, completed in various versions, among which are those by Robert D. Levin and Benjamin-Gunnar Cohrs.
- Modest Mussorgsky's opera The Fair at Sorochyntsi, completed in various versions by César Cui, Nikolai Tcherepnin, Vissarion Shebalin and Emil Cooper.
- Mussorgsky's opera Khovanshchina, completed in distinct versions by Rimsky-Korsakov; Maurice Ravel and Igor Stravinsky working together; and Dmitri Shostakovich.
- Mussorgsky's opera Zhenitba, completed in various versions, including Rimsky-Korsakov, Aleksandr Gauk, Mikhail Ippolitov-Ivanov, Alexander Tcherepnin, Gennady Rozhdestvensky and Vyacheslav Nagovitsyn.
- Jacques Offenbach's operetta Belle Lurette, completed by Léo Delibes.
- Jacques Offenbach's opera Les contes d'Hoffmann, compiled in distinct versions by Ernest Guiraud, Fritz Oeser, and more recently (as more sketches have come to light) by Jean-Christophe Keck.
- Sergei Prokofiev's opera Maddalena, completed by Edward Downes.
- Giacomo Puccini's opera La rondine, completed by Lorenzo Ferrero.
- Ottorino Respighi's opera Lucrezia, completed by Elsa Respighi.
- Arnold Schoenberg's opera Moses und Aron, third act written but never set to music, completed by Zoltán Kocsis with the permission of Schoenberg's heirs.
- Franz Schubert's Symphony No. 7, 8, and 10, completed by Brian Newbould.
- Anton Bruckner's Symphony No. 9, completed in various versions by William Carragan, Nicola Samale, Giuseppe Mazzuca, John A. Phillips, and Benjamin-Gunnar Cohrs working together, and Gerd Schaller.
- Alexander Scriabin's Mysterium, of which the Prefatory Action was completed by Alexander Nemtin.
- Pyotr Ilyich Tchaikovsky's Piano Concerto No. 3, completed by Sergei Taneyev.
  - This work was originally intended to be a Symphony in E♭; it would have been his 6th symphony had he not abandoned it (the work now known as his Symphony No. 6 in B minor, or Pathétique, is completely different). Tchaikovsky converted his sketches into a piano concerto, and in that form it was completed by Taneyev. However, Semyon Bogatyrev took the original sketches and completed the symphony Tchaikovsky had first planned, publishing it as Tchaikovsky's "Symphony No. 7".
- Carl Maria von Weber's opera Die drei Pintos, completed by Gustav Mahler.

Peter Schickele parodied the concept in his "Unbegun Symphony", which contains only movements III and IV because, as Schickele put it, "I was born too late to write the first two movements."

==== Modern recordings ====
Since recording equipment has been an integral part of writing music it has been possible to use the original master tapes and demos to construct a song from the parts that had already been completed. Many demos are released officially if the artist has been unable (or unwilling) to complete it, or made available as a bootleg recording. The continued popularity of the Beatles led to "Free as a Bird" and "Real Love" being released in the mid-1990s after the band members pieced together incomplete recordings by the deceased John Lennon. Both songs reached the top five in the British singles chart.

In 1969, after releasing their self-titled album the year before, the Beatles began working on an album entitled Get Back, which was never completed. Most of the songs from Get Back were eventually used on the Let It Be album.

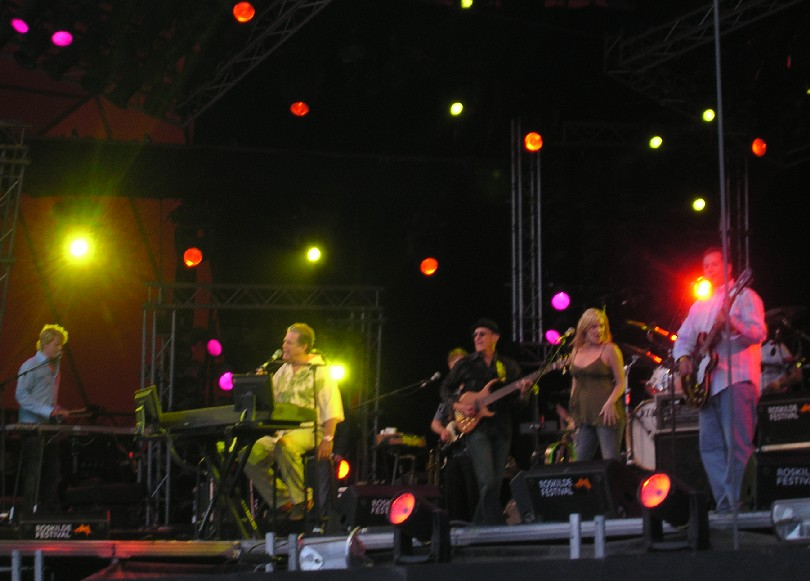
Brian Wilson performing Smile as a solo artist in 2005

The Beach Boys' Smile is considered the most legendary unreleased album in the history of popular music. Recorded in 1966 and 1967, Smile was to be the followup to the album Pet Sounds (1966), but due to a plethora of reasons including project leader Brian Wilson's deteriorating mental health and increased friction among the band members as well as between the band members and the record company executives, the band abandoned the project after completing numerous recordings slated for the project (which were included in later, less ambitious albums). In 2004, Wilson and writing partner Van Dyke Parks went into the studio, and newly recorded the material and released it as a completed solo album. That album was used as a template to construct a version of the Beach Boys album from the original Smile Sessions in 2011.

Some of the most infamous unfinished modern albums are those of American rapper Kanye West. West's critically acclaimed fifth studio album My Beautiful Dark Twisted Fantasy was preceded by the unreleased album Good Ass Job. The most infamous unfinished album by West is Yandhi, which was announced on September 17, 2018, the album was worked on from mid 2018 to early 2019. Yandhi was ultimately scrapped in favor of Jesus Is King, and its songs have been repurposed and released on other projects since. Other unfinished albums by West include: Carti Ye, a collaborative album with Playboi Carti, Vultures 3, a planned third album with singer Ty Dolla Sign as ¥$, and War, a collaborative album with English musician James Blake.

Janis Joplin died of a drug overdose during the recording sessions for Pearl. The album was released three months after her death with ten songs, including two apparently incomplete recordings. "Buried Alive in the Blues" was released as an instrumental, and "Mercedes Benz" was released as an a capella vocal.

Other famous unfinished rock albums include the Who's rock opera Lifehouse, Bob Dylan's The Basement Tapes, Jimi Hendrix's First Rays of the New Rising Sun and Jeff Buckley's My Sweetheart the Drunk. All have been released, in whole or part, in various posthumous forms in the ensuing years, Lifehouse being another case of using demos to present a completed work.

Several artists have found that some of their studio work have been leaked onto the Internet before their album has been completed. System of a Down's 2002 follow-up to Toxicity, untitled at the time, was leaked onto the Internet as MP3 files. When the album was released under the title Steal This Album! the songs were significantly different from the work-in-progress, with different titles, lyrics and even melodies. There were some reports that the changes were a direct result of negative feedback about the leaked material. Similarly, Lil Wayne had a multitude of songs intended for Tha Carter III leak throughout 2007, which eventually caused its delay to mid-2008. Material from said sessions was compiled for his 2007 EP The Leak.

Some artists will try to ensure that their work is completed (as much as possible) before their health prevents them from continuing. Johnny Cash, aware of his failing health, made sure that he recorded the vocals for 60 more songs, with the music being completed after his death. These songs were compiled by producer Rick Rubin and released posthumously as American V: A Hundred Highways and American VI: Ain't No Grave. However, not all artists get the chance to complete their work before their death, and the recordings that are made public may be somewhat different from what had originally been intended. From a Basement on the Hill by Elliott Smith was released posthumously in 2004 with comments from the initial album producer saying that "[t]he record he would have delivered would [have] had more songs, would have had different mixes and [been] a little more in your face".

Richard Carpenter released several tracks decades after his sister Karen died in 1983, leaving a multitude of unfinished work. One track, released on the "Interpretations" compilation album in 1995, included Karen's lead vocal for the song "Tryin' to Get the Feeling Again" which had previously been recorded and released by Barry Manilow. The lead had been lost for years on a mislabelled tape. Strings, piano, and backup singers were added to the sound of Karen's lead vocal, while Richard left the sound of her turning the lead sheet over in the finished product. Another track was Karen's cover "The Rainbow Connection", which had been written by Kenny Ascher and Paul Williams for Jim Henson to sing as Kermit the Frog in The Muppet Movie (1979). Recording it only a year later, Richard claims that Karen just did not like the song and that was why it was omitted from their 1981 album, Made in America. A toy piano, choir, and strings were added against Karen's vocals. The song was released in 2001 on the album As Time Goes By, considered the final studio album of the duo.

=== Film ===
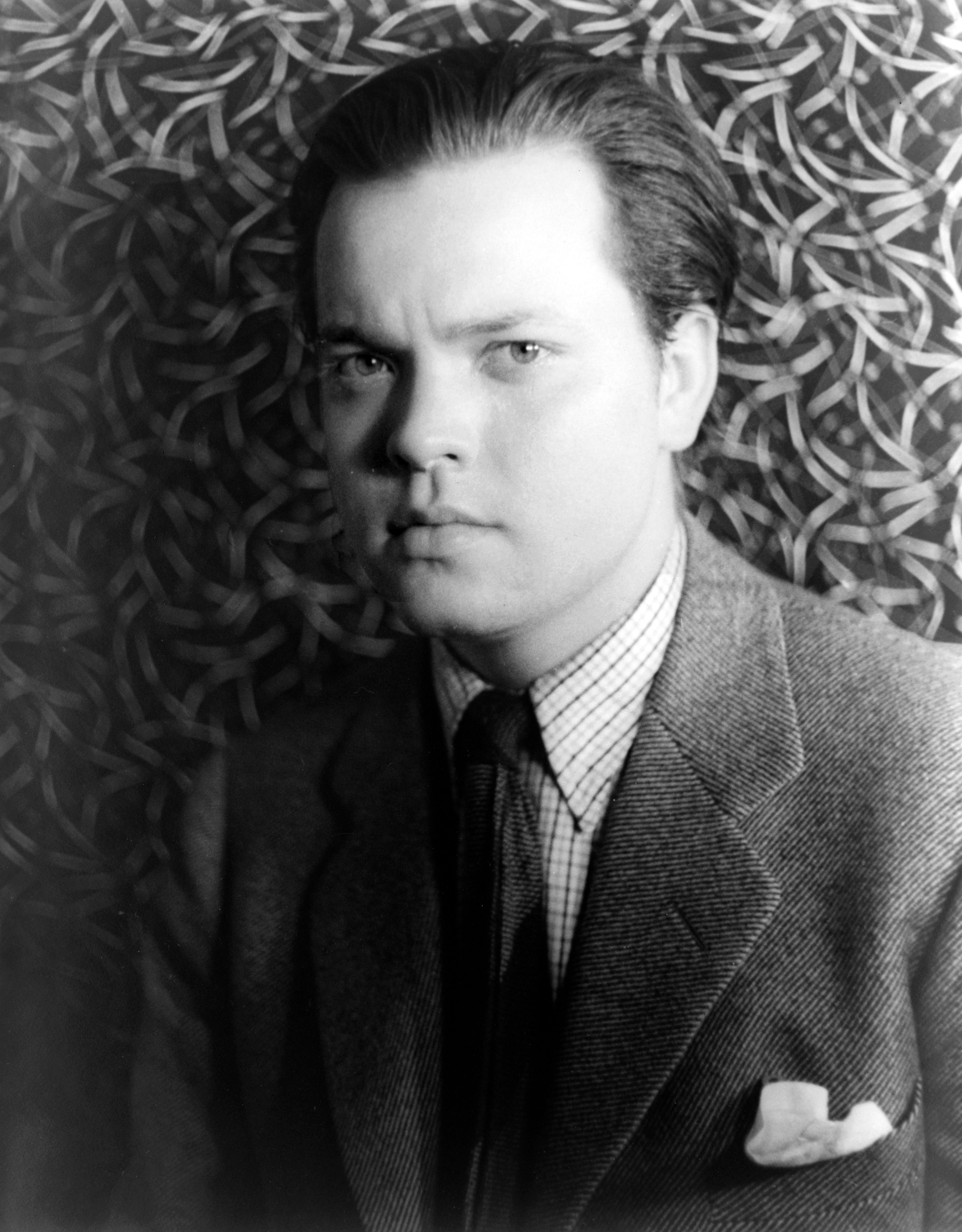
Orson Welles left behind numerous unfinished films.

Films may not be completed for several reasons, with some being shelved during different stages of the production. In 1990, Arrive Alive was scrapped after a week of filming, when the comedy was not living up to the screenplay. Shelving a film without it ever being released can be very expensive for the studios, with Arrive Alive costing $7 million.

With so many people involved in filmmaking it is possible for a film to remain incomplete because of an injury or death. While a member of the crew (even a producer or director) can often be replaced, it is much more difficult to change to a different actor if many of the scenes have already been filmed, or if a character is strongly associated with an actor's physique, voice, or demeanor, or special skills. For example, Dark Blood was cancelled 80% of the way through filming due to the death of its star River Phoenix. However, the film premiered to a private guest audience on 27 September 2012 at the Netherlands Film Festival in Utrecht, Netherlands. Some films have been completed despite such problems. A famous example is Bruce Lee's Game of Death. Lee died during the filming, and the rest of the filming was finished with Tai Chung Kim, a Lee look-alike, acting as a double, and Yuen Biao acting as a stunt double for action scenes. His son, Brandon Lee, suffered the same fate: he died after filming most of The Crow, but the remaining scenes were played by stunt double Chad Stahelski, with Lee's face digitally composited onto the double.

Continued delays can prevent a film from ever being completed. Something's Got to Give was a 1962 film with a difficult production history, which included the firing of leading lady Marilyn Monroe. She was later rehired but died before filming started; without the delay the film might have been completed.

In Orson Welles's lifetime his unfinished films became legendary. For decades he worked on a version of Don Quixote, and he claimed that the film could be finished despite the deaths of his two leading actors. Citizen Kane remains one of the only films that was released as Welles intended, with most of his other films remaining incomplete or being changed by the studios. His death on 10 October 1985 came while he was working on The Other Side of the Wind and The Dreamers; the former was completed in 2018 by Peter Bogdanovich.

Animated films, though less vulnerable to problems such as the death of an actor, can still fail to be completed. The Thief and the Cobbler was a twenty-six-year animated film project by Richard Williams which was taken away from him and completed by Fred Calvert. The workprint of the original film became available as a bootleg, and there have been several attempts to restore the film, most notably Garrett Gilchrist's "Recobbled" cut. The 1978 animated adaptation of The Lord of the Rings was not viewed by the studio as enough of a commercial success to warrant the funding of a sequel, thus not completing the story from the original book.

Multi-part films like the animated The Lord of the Rings and entire film series can also end up being unfinished, in spite of ambitious plans. 20th Century Fox's attempt to adapt Rick Riordan's Percy Jackson & the Olympians series stopped after the second book, Percy Jackson: Sea of Monsters, when plans to adapt the third book, The Titan's Curse, fell through. Lionsgate Films' plan to adapt Veronica Roth's Divergent book trilogy also faced a similar fate when it tried to split its adaptation of the final novel, Allegiant, into two parts, similar to how it was done for the final book of the Harry Potter book series, Harry Potter and the Deathly Hallows and the final book of The Hunger Games trilogy, Mockingjay, but the critical and commercial failure of the first part, The Divergent Series: Allegiant, ultimately discouraged efforts to produce and release the second part or close out the story whatsoever.

There is debate whether Stanley Kubrick's last film Eyes Wide Shut was complete at the time of the director's death, three months before the movie was due to be released, as Kubrick had a history of continuing to edit his films up until the last minute, and in some cases even after initial public screenings.

Cristian Nemescu died during the editing of California Dreamin'. The producers decided to release it in its unfinished state with a runtime of 155 minutes. The film is sometimes titled California Dreamin' (endless) (Romanian: California Dreamin' (nesfârșit)) as it is unfinished.

=== Television ===
Consisting of many episodes that are grouped together in seasons or series, a long-form television show that intends to tell a continuous, long story can be cancelled for many reasons before it broadcasts all of its planned episodes and resolves all story arcs and its central premise.

A television show can be cancelled as the series is getting started, or even before a single episode has been broadcast. In most cases, to get a series broadcast, its creators must typically produce a pilot episode to convince a television network to pick up and support it. There is no guarantee that the pilot will air; the network holds the final say on whether the series will go forward. Networks sometimes cancel a series after it airs roughly half of its first season, and air a mid-season replacement instead of the second half of the season. If a series fails to broadcast, it can be considered unfinished in the sense that substantial effort was put into developing it and much more work could have been done on it had it been able to proceed.

At the end of a season, a television series is cancelled if its network does not order any future seasons to follow. A series is often considered unfinished if it does not resolve all of its planned story arcs and central premise by that time. In such a situation, the series' creators may make a bid to keep the series going by intentionally ending the current season finale on a cliffhanger to give fans the impression that the series hasn't been resolved properly. This tactic does not always succeed, and can potentially produce an exacerbating bout of disappointment among fans if the series is nevertheless cancelled and left truly unfinished – a fate that befell Iron Fist. Alternatively, the creators of a series put in a similar predicament may choose to design the season finale to function like a series finale so as to bring a sense of closure to the audience in case the series is indeed cancelled and prevented from fully accomplishing its goals.

Some unfinished television series may be revived for various reasons and ultimately given a proper ending. Samurai Jack was cancelled in 2004 after four seasons without a conclusive resolution to its central plot, which Adult Swim eventually provided when it revived the series for a fifth and final season in 2017. The 2008 3D Star Wars: The Clone Wars was cancelled in 2013 partway through its planned run in favor of other Star Wars projects headed by Disney after it acquired Lucasfilm a year prior; the series would remain unfinished for years until Disney and Lucasfilm decided to revive and finally finish it with one final season, released exclusively on Disney+ in the first half of 2020, with the true series finale, "Victory and Death", airing on Star Wars Day. Scooby-Doo! and the Curse of the 13th Ghost was commissioned to resolve a plot hole in the relatively obscure mid-1980s Saturday morning cartoon The 13 Ghosts of Scooby-Doo. In other instances, the revived series may appear to be merely a means to attract nostalgic viewers, with no plan to give a proper conclusion to the overarching plot threads left unresolved at the end of the original run; such criticism was leveled at The X-Files for its 10th and 11th seasons, in 2016 and 2018, which also both ended on a frustrating cliffhanger, resulting in a strong backlash toward each finale, even though some earlier episodes were praised.

Finally, other outside circumstances can prevent the completion of a piece of television. The 1980 Doctor Who serial Shada was abandoned after strike action prevented the cast and crew from gaining access to the studio. Rearranging filming of the serial was deemed as less important than recording Christmastime programming, so the serial was left incomplete. A 1992 release linked filmed scenes with narration to describe missing scenes, for a VHS release. In 2017, the original cast was reunited to record audio for an animated reconstruction of missing scenes according to the original script.

=== Software ===
Computer software, particularly games, are sometimes canceled quite far into their development. Occasionally they are demonstrated to the press so that previews can be written but are never completed or published. Amen: The Awakening had an extensive preview written in the magazine PC Paradox in 1999, including numerous screenshots, which generated a lot of interest in the project. However, it was canceled the following year. Due to continued interest in a game, some are eventually made available in their unfinished state. Combat 2, the sequel to the 1977 Atari VCS-bundled game Combat, was never completed, but many years later, at the 2001 Classic Gaming Expo, 200 copies of the unfinished game were sold after a company created a box and manual.

Video game series can also end up unfinished. For example, software developer Ultimate Play the Game had released four completed titles on the ZX Spectrum which starred their pith-helmeted hero, Sabreman. Completing each adventure would tease the title of the next title in the series, with the exception of Underwurlde which contained multiple exits, each alluding to a future title. The fifth intended adventure, Mire Mare was mentioned at the conclusion of Underwurlde, Knight Lore and Pentagram, but following the acquisition of Ultimate to publisher U.S. Gold, the title never saw release. Another example is Star Wars: The Force Unleashed, which only lasted two games despite the sequel, Star Wars: The Force Unleashed II, ending with hints of a third game that was eventually canceled due to Disney's acquisition of Lucasfilm and the consequent decanonization of the Star Wars Expanded Universe the games were part of.

One unique phenomenon of a video game franchise that had almost received another title, Mega Man Legends, infamously experienced an official announcement by publisher Capcom of a resolution to the second game's cliffhanger ending in the ill-fated Mega Man Legends 3. After the cancellation of Legends 3 in 2011, the series narrative remains unresolved over two decades since the 2000 sequel's ending.

Software undergoes a testing phase that helps to eliminate problems before it is released; however, beta testing is a form of testing where the software is open to the public (usually limited to a set number of people or organizations) but is still essentially unfinished. This is often an important part of the development of a software package. There have also been instances of video games and software that are unfinished because they are still in development while being available to a larger group of people to test them, whether by remaining in an early access state for a prolonged period of time or ending up stuck in perpetual beta.

If a piece of software is becoming overly delayed the developer may just release the program despite the presence of a few bugs. The Internet has allowed patches to be deployed that fix these bugs, but before such technology was available the problems could not be fixed after the game was published. Even with this, a game with too many bugs when it is made public will receive very poor reviews that will undoubtedly affect sales. For example, 2002's Destroyer Command received some very positive reviews about many aspects of the game but was criticized for the number of glitches it contained that, given a lengthier software testing phase, should have been fixed. Some developers choose to disable certain features to release the game on time, especially if a project has seen an amount of feature creep. One such title was Cinemaware's 1986 Defender of the Crown, which was released before all the features were completed when the company was faced with a strict deadline and the loss of two programmers.

In modern gaming, high-profile titles that eventually release with content missing or a large number of bugs are often referred to as "unfinished" games by both critics and the community, especially if these bugs or missing content are subsequently resolved with a later patch. For example, Ubisoft Montreal's Assassin's Creed Unity contained a large number of bugs on release, leading some commentators, both contemporary and retrospective, to describe it as "unfinished."

Hidden Palace is a wiki which publishes unfinished video games.

== In law ==
Unfinished work is often covered by the copyright laws of the country of origin. The United States have taken the step of creating a law which specifically mentions ongoing work, whereby work which is in progress but will in the future be completed can be covered by copyright. On 27 April 2005 the "Artist's Rights and Theft Prevention Act", a subpart of the Family Entertainment and Copyright Act, was signed into U.S. law. This act allows for organisations or individuals to apply for copyright protection on unfinished commercial products, such as software, films, and other visual or audible media. For example, a photographer can preregister a photograph by giving a written description of what the final piece (or collection thereof) will look like before the work is finished.

In copyright law, an artistic creation that includes major, basic copyrighted aspects of an original, previously created first work is known as a 'derivative work'. This holds for all kinds of work, including those that have never officially been published. The rights of the first work's originator must be granted to the secondary work for it to be rightfully called a 'derivative work'. If no copyright permission is granted from the originator, it is instead called a 'copy'. Upon completion of the new piece both parties hold a joint copyright status, with both having to agree to any publications. When the copyright has lapsed for the original work the second artist fully owns the copyright for their work, but cannot stop distribution of the original piece or another artist from completing the work in their own way. However, such copyrights can only be granted if the work shows significant new creative content.

== See also ==
- Lacuna – a gap in a manuscript, inscription, text, or a musical work.
- List of comics solicited but never published
- Lost film
- Lost literary work
- Lost media
- Lostwave
- Shared universe – a literary technique whereby a series can continue after the death of the original author.
- Tower of Babel – a tower mentioned in Genesis in the Bible where God halted the construction.
