= Martianoids =

1987 video game

- Developer: Ultimate Play the Game
- Publisher: Ultimate Play the Game
- Platforms: ZX Spectrum; Amstrad CPC; MSX
- Release: 1987
- Genre: Action
- Mode: Single-player

Martianoids is a ZX Spectrum video game developed by Ultimate Play the Game and released in 1987.

== Gameplay ==
Although it uses isometric projection, as with Ultimate's second-generation isometric releases such as Nightshade and Gunfright, Martianoids used a scrolling display rather than the flip-screen of earlier titles such as Knight Lore and Alien 8.

As with the contemporary Ultimate title Bubbler, Martianoids was not written by the partnership of Tim Stamper and Chris Stamper. It was instead programmed by a team at U.S. Gold, and was therefore an Ultimate game in name only. It was Ultimate's penultimate title for 8-bit home computers. In 1988, the company became Rare, embarking on a long-running partnership with Nintendo to develop console games.

== Plot ==
Players are given a cryptic introduction describing an attack by aliens known as "The Martianoids". The Martianoids enter the player's ship and attack the brain of the ship with "photon weapons". The player must act to prevent further damage. The player has lasers for defence which destroy internal walls, computer components and so forth, and the aliens.
