= Pentagram (video game) =

1986 video game

- Cover art
- Developers: Disputed; see main article
- Publisher: Ultimate Play the Game
- Series: Sabreman
- Engine: Filmation
- Platforms: MSX, ZX Spectrum
- Release: 1986
- Genres: Action-adventure, maze
- Mode: Single-player

Pentagram is a ZX Spectrum and MSX video game released by Ultimate Play the Game in 1986. It is the fourth in the Sabreman series, following on from his adventures in Sabre Wulf, Underwurlde and Knight Lore. Similarly to Knight Lore it uses the isometric Filmation engine. The game was written by either Tim and Chris Stamper or a U.S. Gold programming team.

== Introduction ==
Typically, for an Ultimate release, the inlay card provides little actual instruction for playing the game, but includes a cryptic short story as an introduction.

..."and silvery waters drawn forth from the well did quench the ravages of time. Decay dissolved, they point to the stars proud and sharp and new. Two you will find and thence, two more, all charmed with the magical dew. Across them you will find the PENTAGRAM. Its form will become as solid as rock for all to see. The runes must you learn and glean, their place in Magic and in this land will they find without aid and the PENTAGRAM will be yours".

— Pentagram documentation, Ultimate Play the Game, 1986

This was Ultimate's way of describing the object of the game, which is to recover the lost Pentagram, an artifact of magical power. Firstly, Sabreman must locate one of the wells located in the maze of screens, shoot it several times with his spell and take the resultant bucket of water to one of the broken obelisks. When dropped on these, the water will "heal" the stone. This must be done with each of the four obelisks to make the titular Pentagram appear in one of the rooms. Once this is done, five magic runestones must be found and placed on the Pentagram itself.

== Gameplay ==
The difficulty to reach "silvery waters"

Though the objective in Pentagram is more complex and obscure than the simple "find and fetch" gameplay of the two previous Filmation games Knight Lore and Alien 8, the gameplay is similar to those two titles. The main differences in this final revision of the Filmation engine are the new ability to shoot enemies with a projectile magic spell, and the ability of the enemies to respawn. The "directional control" system of the previous games was also removed because the Spectrum's single joystick button was now needed to fire Sabreman's spell, so it could no longer be used to jump (instead, "down" on the joystick is used to jump).

The basic gameplay is the same as that of Sabreman's previous outing Knight Lore (without that game's day/night shapeshifting cycle), as he wanders a mazelike system of screens filled with enemies, pieces of movable scenery (often forming obstacles or puzzles), and exits on one or more walls, sometimes high up and difficult to reach.

Pentagram features larger numbers of enemies than either Knight Lore or Alien 8, due to Sabreman's newfound ability to kill them. These include some new flying creatures, such as ghosts and lice, that don't kill Sabreman but get in his way (an idea reprised from Sabreman's second adventure Underwurlde), and may even be jumped onto. These harmless but frequently annoying foes will gravitate toward Sabreman and hover around him disrupting his movement (and sometimes even nudging him off platforms) until they are destroyed.

Others such as witches and zombies are lethal to touch but may be destroyed. These do not head straight for Sabreman, but wander in straight lines until meeting an obstruction, at which point they change direction. The same behaviour is true for the wood spiders, though these are more dangerous as they cannot be killed. The "Wulfsheads" are either static or move in a set pattern and also cannot be killed. When an enemy is destroyed by use of Sabreman's new magic fireball spell, another will drop in from the top of the screen to replace it after a short while, this happening much faster the further into the game the player progresses. There is a maximum of two enemies per screen at any one time, excluding any indestructible ones already in place when a room is entered. This is due to the limitations of the hardware which, as with the previous Filmation games, slows to a crawl when any more than four moving objects are on screen at once.

As with the previous two Filmation games, enemies may interact with scenery in a very basic way, shoving any movable objects (such as logs and tables) along when they bump into them. As before, Sabreman may also push one or more of these objects at once, though in Pentagram he may even move them from a distance with a blast of his magic.

== Reception ==
Reception

Review scores
Publication	Score
Crash	93%
Computer and Video Games	5/10
Sinclair User	3/5
Your Sinclair	7/10

Award
Publication	Award
Crash	Smash!

In terms of gameplay and features Pentagram was the most advanced of the Filmation titles, but some sections of the gaming press were becoming tired of the concept and accused Ultimate of unoriginality. This was Ultimate's third Filmation title (fifth if the Filmation II games, Nightshade and Gunfright, are counted), and by that time other publishers were also releasing their own isometric Filmation-inspired games. Confusion was also a factor, with Your Sinclair lamenting that Pentagram's instructions were "shrouded in Ultimate's rather confusing 'poetry'", and Sinclair User admitted that all they could work out of the objective was "it has something to do with the various wishing wells dotted about the game". Even CRASH, who rated Pentagram very highly, hadn't quite worked out the game's objective at the time of review.

Review scores ranged from the 3/5 awarded by Sinclair User, who described it as "lazy" and criticised a perceived lack of imagination in the setting and design, to the 93% "CRASH Smash" awarded by the ever Ultimate-friendly CRASH magazine, who cited the graphics, re-spawning enemies, and atmosphere as high points.
