= Mire Mare =

Unreleased video game by Ultimate Play the Game

Mire Mare is an unreleased video game by Ultimate Play the Game.

== Background ==
Underwurlde, the second game in the Sabreman series of titles from Ultimate (between Sabre Wulf and Knight Lore), has three separate exits, each naming another game in the series. The first exit names Knight Lore, which was released at the same time as Underwurlde. The second names Pentagram, which surfaced in 1986. The third exit names Mire Mare, which was expected, but never published.

On completion of Knight Lore, the poem displayed reads:

THE POTION CASTS
ITS MAGIC STRONG
ALL EVIL MUST BEWARE
THE SPELL HAS BROKEN
YOU ARE FREE
GO FORTH TO MIREMARE

On completion of Pentagram, the message displayed is:

CONGRATULATIONS
YOU HAVE COMPLETED
THE PENTAGRAM
YOUR ADVENTURE CONTINUES IN
MIRE MARE

Rare (the company that rose from Ultimate's ashes) revealed in the late 1990s that the game would have been similar to the top-down Sabre Wulf. They also explained that although the basic game design was completed, Ultimate's hectic schedule meant that the title's actual coding was never completed.
