= Gunfright =

1985 video game

- ZX Spectrum cover art
- Developer: Ultimate Play the Game
- Publisher: U.S. Gold
- Engine: Filmation II
- Platforms: ZX Spectrum, Amstrad CPC, MSX
- Release: ZX Spectrum: UK: December 1985; CPC, MSX: UK: 1986
- Genre: Action-adventure
- Mode: Single-player

Gunfright is an open-world action-adventure game developed by Ultimate Play the Game and published by U.S. Gold. It was first released for the ZX Spectrum in December 1985, then released for Amstrad CPC and the MSX the following year. The player takes the role of a sheriff in the town of Black Rock and is tasked with eliminating outlaws who are scattered throughout the settlement.

The game was developed directly after Nightshade, and re-uses the latter game's Filmation II game engine that allows images to be rendered without overlapping each other. The game received mostly positive reviews upon release; praise was directed at the graphics and presentation, but criticism was directed at the game's similarity to Nightshade. It was later included in Rare Replay, Rare's 2015 Xbox One retrospective compilation.

== Gameplay ==
The interface displays the current wanted outlaw, ammunition count, and overall score.

Gunfright is presented in an isometric format and set in the fictional town of Black Rock. The player takes on the role of Sheriff Quickdraw, whose main objective is to track down and kill a gang of outlaws who are hiding in the town. The game begins with a first-person perspective targeting minigame in which vertically scrolling bags of money can be shot at using crosshairs. Shooting the bags give the player initial sums of money which can be used to purchase ammunition.

Sheriff Quickdraw must locate the wanted outlaws one by one. Once an outlaw has been found and shot to initiate a duel, the game shifts to the first-person targeting minigame. This time, the player must shoot the rapidly moving outlaw as quickly as possible. The player can either wait for the outlaw to draw, or take the initiative and shoot first, which will make the bandit draw his weapon as well. If the player successfully shoots an outlaw, a bounty is paid (increasing with every round), and a new outlaw enters the town.

Players encounter helpful residents who will point the way to outlaws. The residents need to be protected during gameplay, as the player has to pay a fine if any are shot by either bandits or Sheriff Quickdraw himself. Some outlaws are mounted on horseback, meaning that the player may have to saddle a horse power-up to pursue them.

== Development ==
Gunfright was developed with the isometric projection game engine known as Filmation II, which was used previously in Ultimate's 1985 ZX Spectrum game Nightshade. The Filmation engine was created by the Stamper brothers to portray 3D imagery. Filmation II used an image masking technique that drew and filled holes in the background, allowing the game to create composite structures out of pixelated drawings without visual overlay, despite the limitations platforms such as the ZX Spectrum offered.

Gunfright was initially released for the ZX Spectrum in December 1985, and was the last game to be developed under the direct involvement of the Stamper brothers. Realising that the graphical limits of platforms such as the ZX Spectrum had been pushed, future projects such as Blackwyche and Dragon Skulle were handed over to designer brothers Dave and Bob Thomas, who were often uncredited for their work. Gunfright, along with Knight Lore, Alien 8 and Nightshade, were re-released for the MSX in 1986, with Gunfright and Sabre Wulf being ported to the Amstrad CPC later that year.

== Reception ==
Reception

Review scores
Publication	Score
Crash	93%
Your Sinclair	7/10
Computer Gamer	95%

The game received mostly positive reviews upon release. Reviewers writing for Crash praised the game's graphics as highly detailed and "colourful", but stated that the game was visually similar to Ultimate's immediately previous game, Nightshade. Gwyn Hughes of Your Sinclair thought the graphics were the best aspect of the game, despite similarly comparing them to those of Nightshade. Hughes also praised the game's smooth animation and the techniques used to portray the western town. A reviewer for CVG suggested that the game's style and gameplay was a mix of Nightshade and Nintendo's Duck Hunt. Reviewing the MSX version, a reviewer for Computer Gamer praised the game's plot, and was complimentary of the way the game was able to separate itself from Ultimate's previous game, which had used the same Filmation engine.

Reviewers writing for Crash praised the gameplay, stating that the game's "element" was considerably developed and that the several different stages were "highly addictive". Writers in CVG criticised the gameplay, noting that they found it difficult to distinguish the outlaws from other male inhabitants of the town. They also noted the absence of puzzle elements which was considered "unusual" for an Ultimate game. Bill Bennett of Your Computer similarly considered the omission of puzzle elements unusual, but welcomed the "witty" change in genre from the previous dungeon-themed video games.

== Legacy ==
Gunfright is part of an Xbox One compilation of 30 Rare titles, Rare Replay, released in August 2015.
