= Non finito =

Sculpting technique

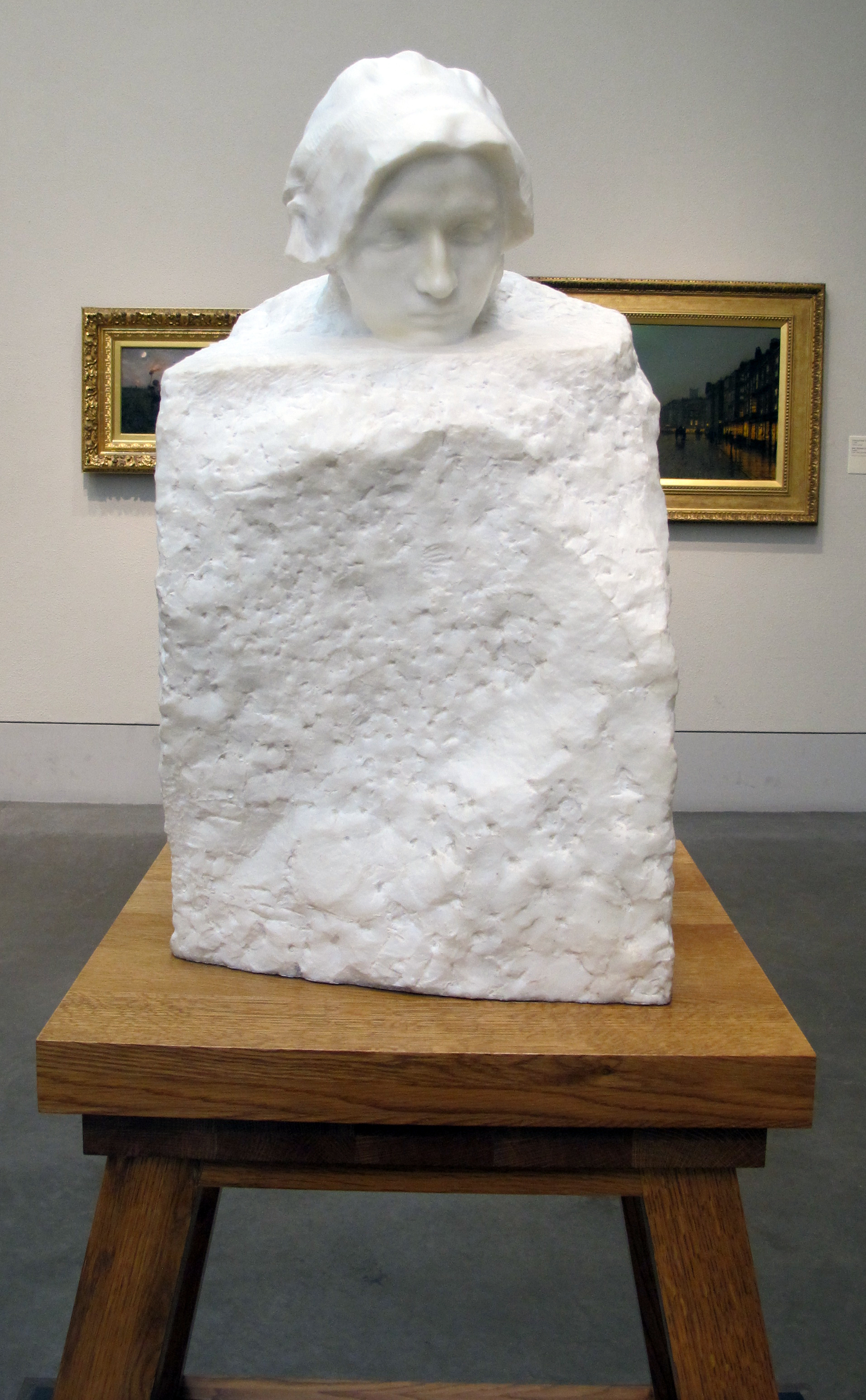
La pensée by Auguste Rodin, 1895

Non finito is an aesthetic quality related to a state of being unfinished. Italian in etymology, non finito literally means "not finished". The term can apply to different artistic media, including both paintings and sculpture. It can refer to a range of unfinished qualities including a looseness or freedom of technique, a deliberately unpolished style, or an abandoned state of completion. Non finito is particularly associated with the artistic discourse of the Renaissance and examples appear in the art Donatello and Michelangelo among others.

The philosophic origins of non finito practice come from antiquity and the theories of Plato. Platonic philosophy states that no work of art completely resembles its heavenly counterpart. The act of leaving a work unfinished is sometimes a neo-Platonic homage to this. In the case of the ancient Romans, artists would sign their work with the verb faciebat (third-person singular imperfect active indicative of faciō). This verb, following their name, would identify them as the artist, but the work as unfinished (non finito). Some artists, however, signed their work this way even if the work had been refined to the highest degree, as when Michelangelo famously signed his sculpture Pietá, the only sculpture he ever signed.
