= Sabre Wulf (2004 video game) =

2004 video game

- Developer: Rare
- Publisher: THQ
- Composer: Robin Beanland
- Platform: Game Boy Advance
- Release: 2004
- Genre: Platform
- Mode: Single-player

Sabre Wulf is a 2004 video game by Rare for the Game Boy Advance. The player controls the safari adventurer Sabreman, who runs and jumps between platforms to retrieve treasure guarded by the Sabre Wulf. The game is a remake of the 1984 action-adventure Sabre Wulf. Though the remake's reviews were generally favourable, sales were lackluster. Reviewers noted the game's simplicity and shallow puzzles. While some found it fun and praised its character animations, reviewers considered its gameplay repetitive.

== Gameplay ==
Sabre Wulf is a traditional platform game in which the player, as the safari adventurer Sabreman, runs and jumps between platforms to retrieve treasure guarded by the Sabre Wulf, who pursues Sabreman back to the start of the level. Sabreman last appeared in 1980s ZX Spectrum games including the original Sabre Wulf, in which he searched for pieces of an amulet used to tame the guardian Sabre Wulf. The 2004 revival extends this backstory, as the evil Dr. Dolittle-Goode steals the amulet and releases Sabre Wulf, who scares townspeople and steals treasure. As Sabreman, the player fights through eight worlds—each consisting of a sequence of platforming levels and culminating in a laboratory level—to retrieve an eighth of the amulet and return Sabre Wulf to captivity. The player travels between levels using a village hub overworld in which Sabreman can speak with inhabitants and prepare for the next raid.

En route to the treasure, the player can also summon Sabreman's collectible creatures, who give the character special abilities needed to advance through the levels. For example, Sabreman use the bear's belly as a trampoline, the serpent as a platform, and an exploding creature as dynamite. The player can either find or purchase these creatures. The quicker the player reaches the level's object, the more valuable the treasure will be. For example, if the player delays, the gold treasure becomes silver or bronze. When the player touches the treasure, Sabre Wulf begins to chase Sabreman, who must backtrack through the level to return the treasure to his tent without aid of the collectible creatures. Since the wolf can outpace Sabreman, the player instead needs to recall both the structure of the map and outmaneuver the wolf. If the wolf touches Sabreman, the player restarts from the beginning of the chase rather than the beginning of the level. The game's difficulty does not increase evenly, and some consecutive levels will require the use of all collectible creatures while the next require none. If the player completes a level with the gold treasure, a challenge mode version of the level unlocks with restrictions on time and helper creature selection.

Sabre Wulf's humour is British and self-referential to the developer's history. Some of Sabre Wulf's locations and characters reference games by Ultimate Play the Game, the company that preceded Rare. The majority of the in-game speech is portrayed as murmurs similar to the characters in Banjo-Kazooie or Grabbed by the Ghoulies. Sabreman has several speech samples, such as "run for it" when Sabre Wulf starts to chase and "smashing" when finishing a level. The player can save game progress in either of two save slots on the cartridge.

== Development ==
The title debuted at the 2001 Electronic Entertainment Expo. It uses a similar engine as used in the Banjo and Donkey Kong Country series. Sabre Wulf is depicted in pre-rendered computer graphics, similar to the technique Rare used in earlier games, and has subtle lighting effects, as when Sabreman approaches a light source, but otherwise did not use the Game Boy Advance's hardware effects.

The game originally included a working picture-in-picture mode for the player to track the wolf during the chase. The feature limited other features the team wanted to include and was removed.

== Reception ==
Reception

Aggregate score
Aggregator	Score
Metacritic	75/100

Review scores
Publication	Score
Computer and Video Games	8.6/10
Edge	6/10
Eurogamer	8/10
Game Informer	6.5/10
GamePro	4/5
GameSpot	7.3/10
GameSpy	4/5
GamesTM	4/10
GameZone	8.5/10
IGN	8/10
NGC Magazine	85/100
Play	B

The game received "generally favourable" reviews, according to video game review aggregator Metacritic. Despite its innovations and favourable reviews, sales were lackluster.

Reviewers found the game simple, with shallow platforming puzzles and gameplay. Some found it fun, while others did not. Reviewers from both sides considered its gameplay repetitive—as GamesTM put it: the player rehearses and memorizes short, basic levels for the fastest time. The game's difficulty can widely vary between levels, and ramps up about a third into the game. Some reviewers found the wolf to be a bad foil to Sabreman and easily outmaneuvered. To Sabre Wulf's credit, Eurogamer wrote, the game was accessible and absorbing, among the best platformers on the Game Boy Advance. GamePro put Sabre Wulf in the lineage of WarioWare in that its quick and otherwise mundane levels became interesting when paired with its varied creature puzzle and racing hooks. NGC Magazine also appreciated the blend of strategic puzzle-platforming and making a fast escape. Other reviewers were also drawn to the puzzle elements.

Sabre Wulf is oriented towards action, and IGN considered its few adventure elements of brief "busy-work wandering" and non-player character conversation weak. Edge described these parts as "filler" and even considered the simple platforming "ultimately disposable" fun. GameSpot felt that player creativity was constrained by the limited helper creature choices, a game mechanic similar to that of The Lost Vikings. Reviewers suggested that the game's jump controls could be tighter, and collision detection more forgiving. Two reviewers recommended the game for short play sessions, during downtime, and IGN appreciated that the game was longer in length than Rare's prior Game Boy Advance game, Banjo-Kazooie: Grunty's Revenge.

Reviewers praised the game's character animations and designs, but differed on the overall graphics, which many praised and others derided. For instance, while Eurogamer considered uncommonly good for a Game Boy Advance game, IGN deemed the visuals less impressive since Rare pioneered the style a decade earlier, and GameZone wanted for more special effects. GamePro found the graphics muddied on the Game Boy Advance, while GameSpot only found the game muddy when enlarged for a big screen with the Game Boy Player. The website reported that Sabre Wulf's bright palette otherwise played fine on handheld.

GamePro compared the soundtrack to a whimsical Braveheart, and GameZone described the sound as "spectacular", especially the environmental sound effects and humorous character gibberish during dialogue.

Sabre Wulf struggled with the double bind of not pleasing fans of the 1984 original and not enticing new fans to compete with brands such as Pokémon. Of British outlets, GamesTM too wrote that Sabre Wulf did not match the legacy of its forebears and Retro Gamer found the remake disappointing, though Eurogamer figured that players familiar with the developer's history would at least appreciate the in-game references and nostalgia. In the United States, IGN considered the game a "welcome throwback" to Rare's 1980s ingenuity but expected much of its British humour to be lost on players. Play found the humour entertaining and GameSpot thought that the British accent in Sabreman's sound effects perfectly fit his persona. Others found the character sound effects humorous or grating. At the time of the game's release, Eurogamer questioned the game's intended demographic and marketing strategy, and GamesTM, in light of what it deemed repeatedly low quality releases, challenged the worth of Rare's acquisition.
