= Molecule Man (video game) =

1986 video game

- Developer: Robin Thompson
- Publisher: Mastertronic
- Platforms: ZX Spectrum, Plus/4, Commodore 64, Atari 8-bit, Amstrad CPC, MSX
- Release: 1986
- Genre: Action-adventure
- Mode: Single-player

Molecule Man is an isometric 3D action-adventure video game released by Mastertronic in 1986 for 8-bit home computers. A level editor is included enabling the player to create their own mazes.

== Plot ==
Molecule Man is trapped in a radioactive maze and must reach the escape teleport before the radiation kills him.

=== Gameplay ===
ZX Spectrum screenshot. On the far left is a coin that can be picked up. The smiling ghost in the centre of the screen is static and for decoration only. The maze wall sections on the left are ZX Microdrives.

The player controls the Molecule Man in his quest to escape an irradiated maze within a time limit. He must find and repair the escape teleporter using 16 circuit board pieces scattered around the maze.

Coins can be found lying around the maze. These must be collected and taken to dispensers to purchase bombs and pills which can be used to open up previously inaccessible areas of the maze and to stave off the effects of the radiation respectively.

Molecule Man is somewhat unusual in that the maze contains no guardians or hazards other than the radiation itself.

== Reception ==
ZX Computing began their review with "Not another 3-D maze game! 'Fraid so", but concluded with "In Molecule Man you have a very difficult challenge combined with a game creator at a price which makes unbelievable value", giving it a "Great" score.

A 1986 review for Sinclair User was equally positive: "It's a little bit of Cylu, it's a bit Ultimate, it's a bit like quite a few other games, but Molecule Man is still wonderful ... a very entertaining, fairly original and addictive game."

Crash rated Molecule Man very highly - just missing out on a Crash Smash - summarising the game as "An excellent piece of budget software".

Your Sinclair found the game to be above average, rating it a 6 out of 10, and concluded with "Not a game to change the universe, but still a bargain little package".
