= Nightshade (1985 video game) =

1985 video game

- ZX Spectrum cover art
- Developer: Tim and Chris Stamper
- Publisher: Ultimate Play the Game
- Engine: Filmation II
- Platforms: ZX Spectrum, Amstrad CPC, BBC Micro, MSX, Commodore 64
- Release: ZX Spectrum, BBC Micro, CPC: UK: 1985; MSX: JP: 1986
- Genres: Action-adventure, maze
- Mode: Single-player

Nightshade is an action game developed and published by Ultimate Play the Game. It was first released for the ZX Spectrum in 1985, and was then ported to the Amstrad CPC and BBC Micro later that year. It was also ported to the MSX exclusively in Japan in 1986. In the game, the player assumes the role of a knight who sets out to destroy four demons in a plague-infested village.

The game features scrolling isometric gameplay, an improvement over its flip-screen-driven predecessors, Knight Lore and Alien 8, all thanks to an enhanced version of the Ultimate Play the Game's Filmation game engine, branded Filmation II. The game received positive reviews upon release; critics praised its gameplay traits, graphics and colours, but one critic was divided over its perceived similarities to its predecessors.

== Gameplay ==
A green-hued, infected player character is pursued through the village of Nightshade by demons.

The game is presented in an isometric format. The player assumes the role of a knight who enters the plague-infested village of Nightshade to vanquish four demons who reside within. Additionally, all residents from the village have been transformed into vampires and other supernatural creatures. Contact with these monsters infects the knight, with repeated contact turning the character from white to yellow and then to green, which will lead to the character's death. The knight may be hit up to three times by an enemy, but the fourth hit will result in a life being deducted.

The objective of the game is to locate and destroy four specific demons. Each demon is vulnerable to a particular object which must be collected by the player: a hammer, a Bible, a crucifix and an hourglass. Once the four items have been collected, the player must track down a specific demon and cast the correct item at it in order to destroy it. Once all four demons have been destroyed, the game will end. In order to defend against other enemies such as vampires and monsters, the player can arm themselves with "antibodies", which can then be thrown at enemies. Antibodies can be found in houses around the village, and will slowly deplete once used by the player. Other collectible items include extra lives and boots, the latter of which enables the player character to run at a faster speed.

== Background and release ==
Ultimate Play the Game was founded by brothers Tim and Chris Stamper, along with Tim's wife, Carol, from their headquarters in Ashby-de-la-Zouch in 1982. They began producing multiple video games for the ZX Spectrum throughout the early 1980s. The company were known for their reluctance to reveal details about their operations and upcoming projects. Little was known about their development process except that they used to work in separate teams; one team would work on graphics whilst the other would concentrate on other aspects such as sound or programming. When a journalist reviewing Nightshade for Crash asked Tim and Chris Stamper what the object of the game was they responded: "Oh, we can't tell you that".

The game was developed with the isometric projection game engine known as Filmation II, an upgraded version of the Filmation engine. The Filmation engine was created by the Stamper brothers to portray 3D imagery. Filmation II used an image masking technique that drew and filled holes in the background, allowing the game to create composite structures out of pixelated drawings without visual overlay, despite the limitations platforms such as the ZX Spectrum offered. Nightshade was first released in the United Kingdom for the ZX Spectrum in 1985, and was then ported to the Amstrad CPC and BBC Micro later that year. It was also ported to the MSX exclusively in Japan in 1986.

== Reception ==
Reception

Review scores
Publication	Score
Crash	93%
Computer and Video Games	92%
Sinclair User	100%
Computer Gamer	80%
Home Computing Weekly	80%
Popular Computing Weekly	80%

Award
Publication	Award
Crash	Smash!

The game received positive reviews upon release. Chris Bourne of Sinclair User praised the game's new graphics system, opining that it was "wonderfully" detailed and "juiced up" in contrast to its predecessors, Knight Lore and Alien 8. A reviewer writing for Computer and Video Games praised the graphics as "great" and stated that its sound effects were "up to standard" considering the "dumb" ZX Spectrum. Philippa Irving of Crash thought that the visuals and use of colours were "stunning" and up to Ultimate Play the Game's "usual standards", but she did notice a few instances of attribute clash. A reviewer writing for Computer Gamer asserted that the graphics were "as good as ever", but they admitted that the game seemed "lacking" in comparison to Ultimate Play the Game's most recent releases. Chris Jenkins of Popular Computing Weekly opined that the game's interior visuals looked like "featureless squares", but admitted that the game's background drops were more detailed.

The gameplay was also praised by reviewers. Bourne opined that the game was well-paced in similar vein to arcade-style games, but noted "a sense of déjà vu" with the game's concept, stating that the developer's games were starting to "wear thin". The reviewer from Computer and Video Games appreciated Nightshade's "nice touches", summarising that it was an instant classic from Ultimate Play the Game. Irving criticised the lack of instructions or hints that came with the game, and stated that Nightshade did not set new standards with programming, unlike Knight Lore and Alien 8, but admitted that the game was still another "technically brilliant" game. The reviewer from Computer Gamer enjoyed the wide range of gameplay elements, stating that it was enough to hold their attention for hours. A reviewer from Home Computing Weekly stated that the gameplay was not as addictive as Knight Lore or Alien 8 due to the game's lack of obstacles. Jenkins praised the game's use of its new engine, Filmation II, stating that it was ahead of "everything else" on the ZX Spectrum.

== See also ==
- Gunfright, developed directly after Nightshade, and re-uses the Filmation II game engine.
