= Knight Lore =

1984 video game

- Developer: Ultimate Play the Game
- Publisher: Ultimate Play the Game
- Series: Sabreman
- Engine: Filmation
- Platforms: ZX Spectrum, BBC Micro, Amstrad CPC, MSX, Family Computer Disk System
- Release: EU: November 1984
- Genre: Action-adventure
- Mode: Single-player

Knight Lore is a 1984 action-adventure game developed and published by Ultimate Play the Game, and written by company founders Chris and Tim Stamper. The game is known for its use of isometric graphics, which it further popularized in video games. In Knight Lore, the player character Sabreman has forty days to collect objects throughout a castle and brew a cure to his werewolf curse. Each castle room is depicted in monochrome on its own screen and consists of blocks to climb, obstacles to avoid, and puzzles to solve.

Ultimate released Knight Lore third in the Sabreman series but later claimed to have completed it first and withheld its release for a year to position the company advantageously in anticipation of the game's effect on the market. Knight Lore's novel image masking technique, Filmation, let images appear to pass atop and behind each other without their contents colliding. This created the illusion of depth priority, which the computer did not natively support. By delaying Knight Lore's release, Ultimate protected sales of their then-upcoming Sabre Wulf and created another Filmation game before other developers could copy the style. Ultimate released the original Sabreman trilogy in quick succession in 1984 for the ZX Spectrum. Knight Lore came last, in November. Ports followed for the BBC Micro, Amstrad CPC, MSX, and Family Computer Disk System.

Knight Lore is regarded as a seminal work in British video game history and has been included in multiple lists of top Spectrum games. Critics considered its technical solutions and isometric 3D style a harbinger of future game design. They praised the game's controls and atmosphere of mystery, but noted its difficult gameplay and criticised its sound and occasional graphical slowdown. Knight Lore was named the 1984 game of the year by the Golden Joystick Awards and Popular Computing Weekly readers. Though it was not the first isometric 3D video game, Knight Lore popularised the format. When the isometric, flip-screen style fell out of fashion, Knight Lore's influence persisted in computer role-playing games. Retrospective reviewers remember the game as the first to offer an exploratory "world" rather than a flat surface, but consider its controls outdated and frustrating in the thirty years since its release.

The game was later included in compilations including Rare's 2015 Xbox One retrospective compilation, Rare Replay.

== Gameplay ==
Sabreman atop a stack of blocks in a ZX Spectrum screenshot. Daytime is beginning in the indicator at the bottom right. Knight Lore's gameplay area is depicted in monochrome to avoid attribute clash.

The player, as Sabreman, has been bitten by the Sabre Wulf and now transforms into a werewolf at nightfall. He has 40 days to collect items throughout Melkhior the Wizard's castle and brew a cure for his curse. An onscreen timer shows the progression of day into night, when Sabreman metamorphoses into a werewolf, returning to human form at sunrise. Some of the castle's monsters only attack Sabreman when he is a werewolf. The game ends if the player completes the potion or does not finish the task in forty days. The game's only directions are given through a poem included with the game's cassette tape.

The castle consists of a series of 128 rooms, each displayed on a single, non-scrolling screen. Sabreman must navigate the 3D maze of stone blocks in each room, usually to retrieve a collectible object, whilst avoiding spikes and enemies, which kill him on contact. The player starts with five lives, and loses one for each death; running out of lives ends the game. Stone blocks serve as platforms for the player to jump between; some fall under the player's weight, some move of their own accord, and some can be pushed by enemies or Sabreman. Sabreman jumps higher when in werewolf form, which helps in specific puzzles. The player often needs to move blocks to reach distant objects, which are then used as platforms to reach areas in other puzzles. To complete the game, the player must return 14 sequential objects from throughout the castle to the wizard's cauldron room. At the end of the game, the player receives a final score based on the remaining time and amount of the quest completed.

== Development ==
Ultimate Play the Game, represented by its co-founding brothers, Tim and Chris Stamper, was uncommonly taciturn in matters of press and marketing, though they provided some details on Knight Lore's development to Crash magazine. While Knight Lore was released as the third game in the Sabreman series, the Stamper brothers later claimed to have finished it first, saying they withheld the game for about a year for market reasons: they thought that Knight Lore's advancements—copyrighted as the Filmation engine—would hurt sales of their then-upcoming Sabre Wulf, and used the extra time to prepare another Filmation game (Alien 8) to preempt the sales that would be lost when other publishers would try to copy the technique. Tim Stamper recalled that "we just had to sit on it because everyone else was so far behind". More recent research has suggested this may have been an exaggeration as the coding routines found in Knight Lore are far more optimised than those used in the earlier games. Sabre Wulf was released to commercial and critical success in 1984. The next two Sabreman titles—Underwurlde and Knight Lore—followed in close succession before the end of the year.

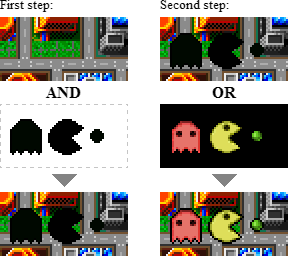
In image masking, the developer adds a hole and then fills in its details.

Filmation and Knight Lore's graphical novelty lay in how images could render without overlapping. Filmation introduced "masked sprites" whereas earlier games used "planar sprites", which overlapped without regard for depth order. Chris Stamper's solution was to use image masking. A mask is a version of an image that defines a background from the subject matter in different colours. When combining the mask and the on-screen composite image, the mask's "background" data was ignored and a hole in the shape of the desired image sprite was added to the background. This was filled in with the sprite's details. Thus, rooms in Knight Lore were drawn one sprite at a time through this masking method. In more recent times, contemporary images render with layer priority set at the individual pixel level. Knight Lore is depicted in monochrome that changes between rooms so as to avoid attribute clash, a computing limitation wherein an object's colour interfered with those of others in close proximity.

Ultimate released Knight Lore for the ZX Spectrum in November 1984. In a press release, they announced the game as the beginning of a new class of adventure games and "the very pinnacle of software development on the 48K Spectrum". As standard for the cryptic company, Ultimate did not circulate screenshots of the game in its press materials or cover art. Knight Lore was subsequently released for the BBC Micro, Amstrad CPC, and MSX later in 1985. The Amstrad version upgraded the monochromatic colouring to a two-colour foreground setup. Jaleco released versions of Knight Lore for MSX and, later, the Famicom Disk System. The latter 1986 release barely resembled its namesake. Ultimate asked Shahid Ahmad, who developed the Knight Lore-inspired Chimera (1985), to develop a Knight Lore port for the Commodore 64, but this did not come to fruition. Knight Lore later appeared in the Spectrum version of the 1986 compilation They Sold a Million II and the 2015 Xbox One compilation of 30 Ultimate and Rare titles Rare Replay.

== Reception ==
Reception

Review scores
Publication	Score
Amstrad Action	Amstrad: 95%
Amtix	Amstrad: 91%
Crash	Spectrum: 94%
Computer and Video Games	Spectrum: 9/10
Eurogamer	8/10
Sinclair User	Spectrum: 9/10
Your Spectrum	Spectrum: 14/15

Knight Lore entered the UK video game charts in the week up to 8 November 1984 while Underwurlde was still number 1, and went on to replace its predecessor at the top of the charts the following week. By the start of 1985 it had been succeeded by Ghostbusters.

Computer game magazines lauded Knight Lore, writing that its graphics were the first of its kind and marked a sea change from its contemporaries. Computer & Video Games (CVG) wrote that they had never seen graphics of its calibre and that it lived up to Ultimate's hype. Peter Sweasey of Home Computing Weekly was left speechless and predicted that Knight Lore would change the market. Crash said it was unlikely to be surpassed as the Spectrum's best game. Crash selected Knight Lore as a "Crash Smash" recommendation in its January 1985 issue. Popular Computing Weekly readers named Knight Lore their 1984 arcade game and overall game of the year. Knight Lore was also named CVG's game of the year at their 1985 Golden Joystick Awards event, and Ultimate was named both developer and programmer of the year.

Knight Lore's atmosphere, which Sinclair User described as a "crepuscular world of claustrophobic menace", inspired many curious questions on the part of the adventurer in contemporaneous 1985 reviews. Crash appreciated the imaginative mystery of the game as they attempted to answer why Sabreman turns into a werewolf, who they preferred to play as, and what the collectible objects throughout the castle do. Sabreman's werewolf transformation sequence, in particular, annoyed CVG and traumatised players, according to Well Played, a book of academic close readings of video games, as players empathised with the suffering Sabreman. The game design gave the impression that the castle was far grander in scale than it was in reality, and Crash wrote that the game's novel eight-way direction scheme suited the 3D space. Crash compared Knight Lore stylistically to the 1984 Avalon, but suggested that the former had bolder visuals. The magazine preferred Knight Lore to its predecessor (Underwurlde) and one critic even considered the former to be Ultimate's best game.

Crash noted how Knight Lore's masking technique addressed issues of flicker and attribute clash, and Sinclair User appreciated how Sabreman disappeared from view when passing behind blocks. In criticism, reviewers considered Knight Lore's sound to be its weakest component, though Your Spectrum and Crash also identified the sometimes cruel difficulty of its gameplay. Later rooms of the castle require pixel-perfect precision, compounded by the anxiety of the running timer, and the game's animations would slow down proportional to the degree of onscreen action.

In reviews of the Amstrad release, Amtix noted the colour additions over the monochromatic original and wrote that Knight Lore was among the Amstrad's best adventures. Their one complaint was the graphical slowdown when too many elements were moving onscreen. Amstrad Action shared this complaint but nevertheless named Knight Lore among the Amstrad's best three games—an improvement on the Spectrum release and on par with the quality of Commodore 64 titles.

== Legacy ==
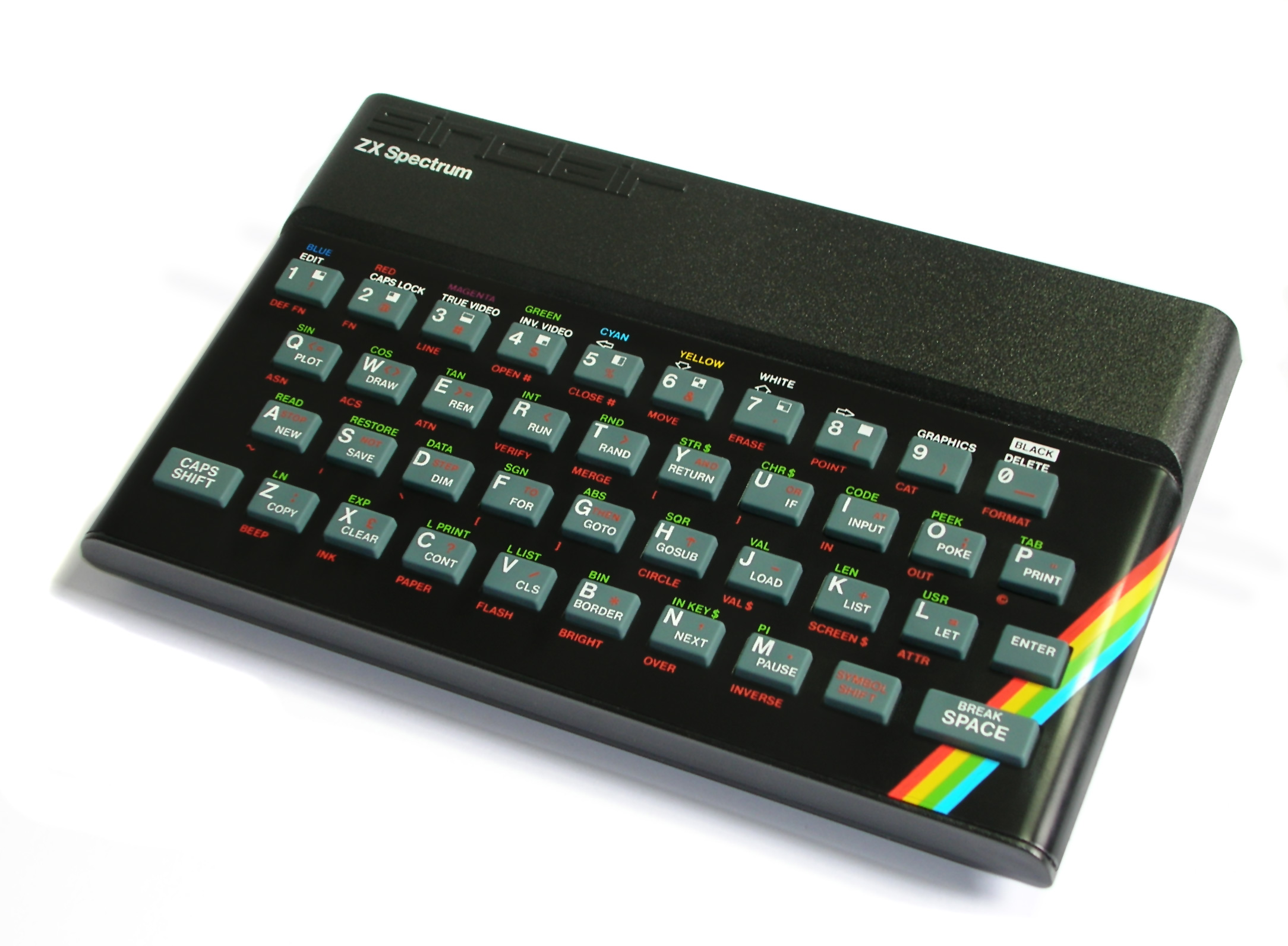
Critics named Knight Lore among the best games for the ZX Spectrum.

Knight Lore is widely regarded as a seminal work in British gaming history. According to Kieron Gillen of Rock, Paper, Shotgun, Knight Lore is second only to Elite (1984) as an icon of the 1980s British computer game industry. British magazine Retro Gamer described players' first impressions of Knight Lore as "unforgettable", on par with the experience of playing Space Harrier (1985), Wolfenstein 3D (1992), or Super Mario 64 (1996) for the first time. Retro Gamer recalled that Knight Lore's striking, isometric 3D visuals were both a bold advance in game graphics and a foretelling of their future. British magazine Edge described the game's graphics engine as "the single greatest advance in the history of video games", and Retro Gamer compared the engine's impact to that of the introduction of sound in film. Knight Lore was not the first to use isometric graphics—earlier examples include Zaxxon (1982), Q*bert (1982), and Ant Attack (1983)—but its graphic style and large in-game world further popularised the technique and put Ultimate and Filmation in its epicentre.

Several video game clones were inspired by Knight Lore. When programmers at The Edge struggled to replicate the isometric style, visiting developer Bo Jangeborg devised his own solution. The result, Fairlight (1985), is regarded as another classic of the platform. The Edge's version of Filmation received its own branding as "Worldmaker". Shahid Ahmad said Firebird's Chimera (1985) was even closer to Knight Lore. Ahmad's "shock" and "admiration" from playing Knight Lore reportedly changed his life and convinced him to continue making games. He released Chimera on the Amstrad CPC, Atari 8-bit, Commodore 64, and ZX Spectrum, customising each port for the processing limitations of its hardware. By 1986, many British video game publishers had produced Knight Lore-style isometric games; examples include Sweevo's World, Movie, Quazatron, Get Dexter, Glider Rider, Molecule Man, Spindizzy, and Bobby Bearing. Many of these titles suffered the same slowdown issues as Knight Lore due to too much on-screen activity.

Ultimate itself released four more Filmation games. Alien 8 (1985) was rushed for release before developers had an opportunity to react to Knight Lore, though Retro Gamer said that its rush was not noticeable, as Alien 8 had a larger game world than Knight Lore, with even more puzzles. Alien 8 and Knight Lore are similar in gameplay, but the former is set in outer space. With the updated Filmation II engine, Nightshade (1985) added colour and scrolling graphics (in place of flip-screen room changes); however, Retro Gamer regarded its gameplay as comparatively dull. Gunfright (1986), reported as the Stampers' last game, also used Filmation II and was more robust than its predecessor. Pentagram (1986) returned to flip-screen rooms and its action-based gameplay included shooting enemies. It sold poorly and was the last Sabreman game. Meanwhile, the Stamper brothers sought to enter the burgeoning console industry. They sold Ultimate to U.S. Gold in the mid-1980s and established Rare to develop Nintendo console games. While Ultimate's last two isometric games were of lesser quality, consumer interest in the genre endured.

The isometric, flip-screen trend continued in Britain for several years. Apart from Fairlight, Sweevo's World and Get Dexter, other isometric flip-screen games included Jon Ritman's Knight Lore-inspired Batman (1986), Head over Heels (1987), The Last Ninja (1987), La Abadía del Crimen (1987), Cadaver (1990), and console games Solstice (1990) and Landstalker (1992). As players grew tired of the genre's similar reiterations, Ritman's games, in particular, brought new ideas. Sandy White, who developed the pre-Knight Lore isometric game Ant Attack, was impressed by Ultimate's in-game "balance" and gutsy design decisions. The developer of The Great Escape, another isometric game, considered Knight Lore to be more "a rival title than an inspiration", but it still spurred him to spend nine months making Where Time Stood Still. Retro Gamer wrote that Knight Lore's influence persisted 30 years later through titles such as Populous (1989), Syndicate (1993), UFO: Enemy Unknown (1994), and Civilization II (1996). The style also spread to computer role-playing games like Baldur's Gate, Planescape: Torment, Diablo, and Fallout. Though GamesRadar's Matt Cundy reported in 2009 that isometric perspective was no longer as prominent a topic in game design, in 2014, Chris Scullion of Vice traced Knight Lore's isometric influence to The Sims 4 (2014) and Diablo III (2012).

Knight Lore was included in multiple lists of top Spectrum games and top games for any platform. It inspired two fangames: a 1999 sequel and a 2010 3D remake, which was in development for four years.

Though isometric games had existed previously, in a retrospective review, Gillen (Rock, Paper, Shotgun) recalled that Knight Lore was the first game to offer a "world" with physical depth for exploration as opposed to the simple mechanics of arcade games. Jeremy Signor of USgamer agreed that Knight Lore felt more like a world than a painting and added that the game's innovative use of successive, single-screen rooms pre-dated The Legend of Zelda by years. Gillen said the game's punishing style (unforgiving gameplay, high difficulty, awkward controls) had become obsolete in the 30 years since its release and criticised Knight Lore as "enormously innovative, incredibly atmospheric, and totally unplayable", suggesting that the similar Head over Heels (1987) had aged much better. Peter Parrish (Eurogamer), too, found the game frustrating, though well-made. Dan Whitehead of the same publication appreciated that the 2015 Rare Replay compilation version of Knight Lore emulated the original's choppy animations as the ZX Spectrum's processor once struggled to render the onscreen objects.
