= Bubbler (video game) =

1987 video game

- Developer: Ultimate Play the Game
- Publisher: Ultimate Play the Game
- Platforms: ZX Spectrum, Amstrad CPC, MSX
- Release: 1987
- Genre: Action
- Modes: Single player, multiplayer

Bubbler is a ZX Spectrum video game developed and published by Ultimate Play the Game in 1987. It was Ultimate's final release for 8-bit home computers before evolving into Rare. The game is an isometric platform game in the style of Marble Madness (1984).

== Development ==
A Commodore 64 version was outsourced to Lynsoft but the release was cancelled as Ultimate thought the game was running too slowly.

== Gameplay ==
The game involves controlling a blob that rolls, jumps, and uses chutes/slide and elevators to navigate 3D platforms, towers, and slopes. The player's objective is to cork bottles to weaken the grip of an evil wizard named Vadra, who has enslaved the inhabitants of the city of Irkon.

== Reception ==
Crash magazine reviewer Ricky disliked the impreciseness of the controls. Sinclair User were more impressed by the game; they did not consider it to be one of Ultimate's most original game or particularly well presented but thought it was very addictive. It was awarded a 5 star rating.
