= Sabreman =

Video game series for the ZX Spectrum

- Developers: Ultimate Play the Game; Rare
- Publishers: Ultimate Play the Game; THQ
- Platforms: Amstrad CPC, BBC Micro, Commodore 64, MSX, Game Boy Advance
- First release: Sabre Wulf; 1984
- Latest release: Sabre Wulf (2004); 2004

Sabreman is a series of action-adventure games developed and published by Ultimate Play the Game for the ZX Spectrum in the 1980s. Some of the instalments were also released on other popular home microcomputers, namely the Amstrad CPC, BBC Micro, Commodore 64, and MSX. The series stars Sabreman, who is depicted wearing khakis and a pith helmet. While the series went dormant after the sale of Ultimate Play The Game, the developer's successor Rare would release a remake of the original game on the Game Boy Advance. Microsoft owns the series through its acquisition of Rare under Xbox Game Studios.

== Games ==
The story of Sabreman's adventures is not developed within the games themselves, but each game would come with an explanation of the story so far on the cassette inlay cards.

- Sabre Wulf (1984), in which Sabreman must escape a large jungle maze by collecting four pieces of an amulet, while avoiding the titular wulf. Finding all four would grant access to:
- Underwurlde (1984), in which Sabreman must find three weapons to defeat three guardians in an extensive system of caverns. This done, three exits are available, each leading to one of the following three games.
- Knight Lore (1984), in which Sabreman arrives at Knight Lore Castle to seek a cure for his newfound lycanthropy. Collecting a number of items for the resident wizard Melkhior achieves both the cure and progress to:
- Pentagram (1986), in which Sabreman, as a newly qualified wizard himself, embarks on a quest to find the Pentagram, a powerful magic artifact. Once this is achieved Sabreman is directed to the final game in the series:
- Mire Mare (cancelled), which was never released and about which little is known.

Sabreman's appearance in Knight Lore inspired the character Sabrewulf in the Killer Instinct series, while Sabreman himself made a cameo in Banjo-Tooie, both by Ultimate's successor company Rare. No other games in the series were released until Sabre Wulf on the Game Boy Advance in 2004, which builds on the story from the original Sabre Wulf, the object being to collect amulet pieces to defeat the Wulf once again. Following the cancellation of Donkey Kong Racing, Rare attempted to rework the game for Xbox and later Xbox 360 as Sabreman Stampede, but was also cancelled during development due to a lack of focus and Rare's unfamiliarity with the hardware. In 2015, the original version of Sabre Wulf, Underwurlde, and Knight Lore were re-released as part of the Rare Replay compilation for Xbox One.
