= Underwurlde =

1984 video game

- Developer: Ultimate Play the Game
- Publisher: Ultimate Play the Game
- Series: Sabreman
- Platforms: ZX Spectrum, Commodore 64
- Release: ZX Spectrum; Q4 1984; Commodore 64; 1985
- Genre: Platform
- Mode: Single-player

Underwurlde is a 1984 platform video game in the Sabreman series by Ultimate Play the Game for the ZX Spectrum and Commodore 64. The player controls the adventurer Sabreman as he jumps between platforms in a castle and its caverns to find an escape past the exit guardians. Underwurlde features about 600 flip screen areas. Unlike other games of its time, Sabreman is not injured when touched by enemies and is instead knocked backwards. Underwurlde is the second game in the series, between Sabre Wulf and Knight Lore, and released shortly before the latter for the ZX Spectrum in late 1984. Another developer, Firebird, ported the game to the Commodore 64 the next year.

Reviewers recommended the original ZX Spectrum Underwurlde release. They noted its expansive game world and appreciated the parts where Sabreman travelled by bubble. Later critics commented on the frustrating difficulty. While the Commodore 64 version was similar to the original, reviews were mixed—one critic thought the title had aged poorly in the year between releases. Your Sinclair put Underwurlde within its top 20 for the ZX Spectrum, though their readers placed it near the bottom of their top 100. The game was later included in Rare's 2015 Xbox One retrospective compilation, Rare Replay.

== Gameplay ==
Atop this screenshot is the player's score and a measure of Sabreman's depth from the surface.

Underwurlde is a platform game viewed from a side-angle perspective. The player controls Sabreman, a pith-helmeted adventurer, as he jumps between platforms in a castle and its caverns to find a way to escape past the exit guardians. Sabreman must use a specific weapon—knife, catapult, and torch—that corresponds to each guardian. The player uses the keyboard's QWERTY keys to progress through a series of flip screens in which the player's character reaches the boundary of the viewable area on the screen to flip to another area, with 597 screens in all. While Sabreman begins in a castle adorned with clocks, birds, and baskets, the character must also descend into caverns through several successive vertical screens. Sabreman automatically attaches a rope to the ceiling when the player guides him off of a ledge. The player can then swing Sabreman side to side to jump to another ledge. At the bottom of a cavern, Sabreman can ride a bubble to the top.

As a change from earlier games by the developer, Sabreman is invulnerable to enemies and is instead knocked back in a bounce by their touch. However, Sabreman will fall to his death if knocked off a precipice. The player starts with seven lives and a few extras can be located throughout the game. Blue gemstone power-ups turn Sabreman invincible to falls from any height for a limited amount of time. Enemies include harpies and gargoyles, which can be killed by Sabreman's weapon. After passing the first guardian, eagles appear and can pick up and drop Sabreman. Underwurlde has three possible endings, and each was designed to correspond to the plots of the three planned sequels in the Sabreman series. The player receives a score calculated by the number of objects acquired, enemies defeated, and percentage of rooms visited. The game also supports keyboard and joystick control, and as with other games from the developer, the instructions packaged with Underwurlde were cryptic, and left the player to figure out the controls and sequence on their own. The Commodore 64 version is similar to the original in appearance and gameplay.

== Development ==
There is little information about the development processes of Ultimate Play the Game, which was known for its avoidance of media spotlight. Its founders, brothers Tim and Chris Stamper, were infamously taciturn both to preserve their time and to let their games speak for themselves. However, as the Sabreman series became popular, their silence contributed to the series' mystique. The main criticism of Underwurlde's predecessor and the first game in the Sabreman series, Sabre Wulf, was its similarity to an earlier game by the Stamper brothers, as both were depicted in a top-down view as action-adventure games, while Retro Gamer said that Underwurlde resolved this criticism by instead using a side view as a platform game. The Stamper brothers claimed to have finished their third Sabreman title, the epochal Knight Lore, in advance of both of its predecessors, although more recent analysis of the code used in the games has suggested this may have been an exaggeration as the routines found in Knight Lore are far more optimised. The Stampers primarily developed for the ZX Spectrum home computer and outsourced the work of converting their games to work on other types of computers to external developers more familiar with the hardware architecture of different platforms. For instance, Firebird released the Commodore 64 versions of Sabre Wulf and Underwurlde. The game was released shortly before Knight Lore for the ZX Spectrum near the 1984 holiday season, and the Commodore 64 version was released a year later.

== Reception ==
Reception

Review scores
Publication	Score
Crash	ZX: 92%
Computer and Video Games	ZX: 35/40; C64: 34/40
Sinclair User	ZX: 8/10
Zzap!64	C64: 69%

Reviewers recommended the original ZX Spectrum Underwurlde release. Critics noted the game world's size and appreciated the parts where Sabreman travelled by bubble. Retro Gamer described the game's near 600 flip screens as "colossal". At the time of its release, Computer and Video Games stated it was likely the most expansive world on the platform. Later reviews noted the exceptional difficulty. Crash magazine recommended the game as "A Crash Smash".

ZX Spectrum magazine Crash considered Underwurlde to be "excellent" and Ultimate's best game. Each of the magazine's three reviewers appreciated different features of Sabreman's navigation within the game, but mainly liked riding volcanic bubbles and being carried by birds. Another reviewer compared Sabreman's jump to Bugaboo (The Flea) and added that the single difficulty level was adequately balanced. All three Crash critics noted that the QWERT keyboard controller mapping worked well in this game, though it was awkward in others. They also praised Underwurlde's detailed graphics and sound. One reviewer additionally noticed the game lacked a score leaderboard, but surmised that this was a trade-off for the expansive world. Unlike Crash, Computer and Video Games did not like the controls, which was the reviewer's main criticism. Another ZX Spectrum reviewer, Chris Bourne (Sinclair User), said that the game was fast, colourful, and akin to a "vertical Atic Atac".

Commodore 64 magazine Zzap!64 reviewers were mixed. Jaz Rignall said it was among the best arcade adventures on the Commodore 64 since it had the right balance of frustration and addiction to keep him playing the ZX Spectrum version for weeks. Gary Penn, however, considered the game average when it was first released for the ZX Spectrum and thought that the port of the year-old game had out-of-date sounds, out-of-tune title music, and was overall not among the Commodore 64's best adventure games. Gary Liddon thought that the Commodore 64 version appeared "crude" compared to other releases for the platform, though perhaps on par for the ZX Spectrum. The magazine noted the difficulty of traversing the vertical caverns and found the eagles annoying, especially when they dropped Sabreman to his death. Zzap!64 critics felt that the game presented well, but was less accessible, overpriced for its age, and poorly animated. Ultimately, they considered the game better than the developer's previous two 1985 releases, but not as good as it could have been. The Computer and Video Games review of the Commodore 64 release judged otherwise: that the version was up to the developer's standards and worth the yearlong wait. The magazine praised Firebird's work on the port.

== Legacy ==
In the early 1990s, Your Sinclair rated the game within the top fifth of their top 100 ZX Spectrum games. Stuart Campbell wrote that Underwurlde was the most simultaneously loved and hated game of its era. Though Sabreman's invulnerability to direct damage was novel, Campbell also recalled the "stratospheric level of frustration". However, the magazine's readers ranked the game near the bottom of their top 100 games for the platform. Underwurlde was later included in the 2015 Xbox One retrospective compilation Rare Replay, wherein critics rated it among the worst of the 30 titles by Ultimate Play the Game and its successor, Rare. Kyle Hilliard (Game Informer) wrote that Ultimate's early games, such as Underwurlde, fared the worst in the package, though he was glad they were included. "By today's standards", began New Zealand newspaper The Nelson Mail, "the likes of ... Underwurlde are so clunky and archaic that they are almost laughably impenetrable; strange relics from a bygone era that serve only to illustrate how far the industry has progressed."
