= Sabre Wulf =

1984 video game

- Developer: Ultimate Play the Game
- Publisher: Ultimate Play the Game
- Series: Sabreman
- Platforms: ZX Spectrum, BBC Micro, Commodore 64, Amstrad CPC
- Release: 1984
- Genre: Action-adventure
- Modes: Single-player, turn-based two-player

Sabre Wulf is an action-adventure game released by British video game developer Ultimate Play the Game for the ZX Spectrum home computer in 1984. The player navigates the pith-helmeted Sabreman through a 2D jungle maze while collecting amulet pieces to bypass the guardian at its exit. The player does not receive explicit guidance on how to play and is left to decipher the game's objectives through trial and error. Sabreman moves between the maze's 256 connected screens by touching the border where one screen ends and another begins. Each screen is filled with colourful flora, enemies that spawn at random, and occasional collectibles.

Ultimate released the game for the ZX Spectrum at an above-average price to combat piracy. Its premium product packaging became a company standard. The developers had finished Sabre Wulf's sequels in advance of its release but—in keeping with their penchant for secrecy—chose to withhold them for marketing purposes. The sequels were released later that year. Ultimate hired outside developers to port Sabre Wulf to other computing platforms: the BBC Micro, Commodore 64, and Amstrad CPC. The game was later featured in compilations, including Rare Replay, a retrospective of games by Ultimate and its successor, Rare.

Many publications recommended the game, and Crash magazine readers named it the "Best Maze Game" of 1984. Sabre Wulf was a bestseller and a financial success. Though its labyrinthine gameplay was similar to that of Ultimate's previous release, reviewers preferred Sabre Wulf. They further noted its difficult gameplay and lauded its graphics. Game journalists remember Sabre Wulf among the Spectrum's best releases, and for starting the Sabreman series.

== Gameplay ==
Sabreman (top right) faces the Wulf in his path (top left) in one of the 256 screens that compose Sabre Wulf's maze. Multiple foes including a spider are in the lower path.

In Sabre Wulf, the player guides the pith-helmeted adventurer Sabreman through a two-dimensional maze presented in a flip-screen format. The player must reconstruct an amulet from its four pieces scattered throughout the maze to bypass the guardian at its exit, (Note: This ACG Amulet is named for Ultimate Play the Game, the developer's former name.) a cave that leads to the sequel, Underwurlde.

The game opens to music composed by Johann Sebastian Bach. Its tiled maze contains 256 screens and is drawn in a 16 by 16 grid. The maze's paths are bordered by tropical flora, populated with enemies and, on its outskirts, surrounded by mountains. Apart from the jungle, the maze also includes several lakes. The player swings Sabreman's sabre with the push of the joystick's fire button to defeat enemies that spawn in random on-screen locations. When the player idles for too long on the same screen, an indestructible bushfire appears to pursue Sabreman. Enemies include spiders, scorpions, snakes, bats, indigenous people, sleeping hippos, and a wolf (the titular Sabre Wulf). Some enemies are killed, others flee when hit, while the wolf, cave guardian, and bushfire are unaffected by the sabre.

The player does not receive any explicit guidance on how to play and is left to decipher the game's objectives through trial and error. Sabre Wulf's graphics fill the screen with a minimal user interface consisting of the current game score, number of lives left and a high score meter on the top row. Sabreman can eat orchid power-ups, which bloom for only a few seconds, to turn the colour of the orchid and receive a temporary character effect. Some effects empower (e.g. invulnerability, increased speed), while others impair (e.g. reversing the player's controls). Sabreman can also collect treasure and extra lives scattered throughout the maze. The Spectrum and Commodore 64 releases include a two-player mode in which players take turns controlling their own Sabreman.

== Development ==
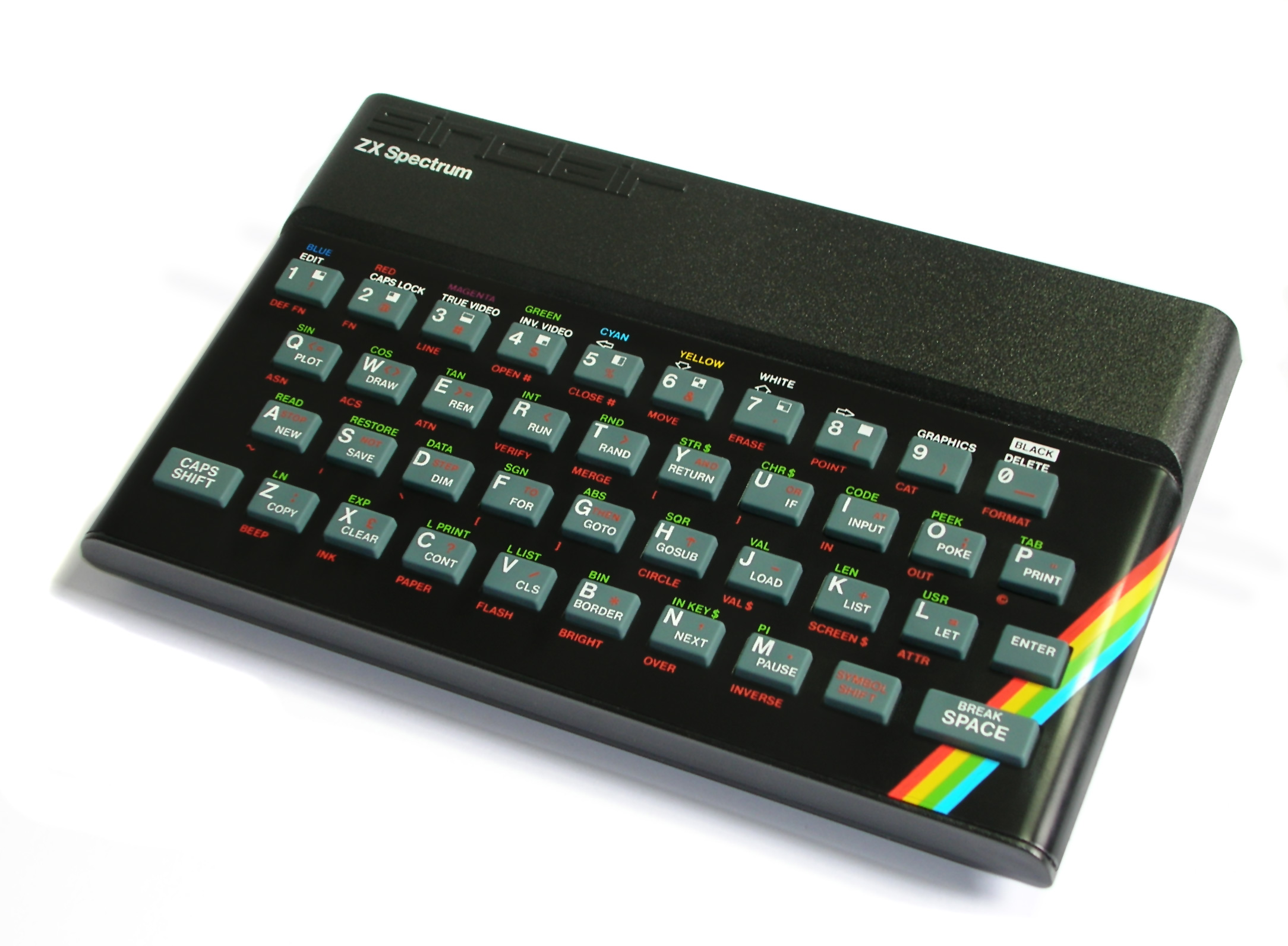
The developers created Sabre Wulf for the ZX Spectrum (pictured) and then outsourced conversions to other platforms.

The developer of Sabre Wulf, Ultimate Play the Game, had a reputation for secrecy. The company very rarely gave interviews or revealed details about their internal practices or upcoming games. Little is known about their development process apart from using Sage IV computers, preferring to develop for the ZX Spectrum's Z80 microprocessor, and often outsourcing development for other platforms, such as those that ran 6502 microprocessors. After releasing Atic Atac at the end of 1983, Ultimate went silent until it ran teaser advertisements for Sabre Wulf in April 1984. The company rarely depicted actual gameplay in their advertisements. They had already prepared Knight Lore, the third game in the Sabreman series, in advance of the character's introduction in Sabre Wulf. Ultimate withheld Knight Lore for about a year because they felt Sabre Wulf would not have sold as well once players saw the former's graphical advancements. Knight Lore subsequently became known as a seminal work in British gaming history and an iconic game of the 1980s for its popularization of the isometric platformer format.

Ultimate released Sabre Wulf for the ZX Spectrum in 1984 and the other Sabreman titles which were released later that year. Sabre Wulf was Ultimate's first game to use what would become the company's standard price and mysterious, unadorned packaging. Retailing at £9.95, Ultimate nearly doubled its usual price in what they saw as a "bold step" to combat piracy. They expected legal owners to be more protective over letting friends copy their higher-priced games. Ultimate had seen competitor prices slowly increasing and felt that the price was fair for their time invested. The game retailed in a large, high-quality cardboard box with a glossy instruction manual, both upgrades over typical game packaging. It became Ultimate's standard packaging for new games. The company's game packaging was undistinguished and showed no screenshots of the in-game world. Ultimate's games also did not display internal credits. The company hired outside developers to complete Sabre Wulf ports for other computers. Paul Proctor wrote the BBC Micro conversion, and in 1985, Greg Duddle wrote the Commodore 64 conversion, which was licensed under Firebird. Sabre Wulf later appeared in the 1985 compilation They Sold a Million, a collection of Spectrum games that had together sold a million units. When the compilation was released for the Amstrad CPC, Sabre Wulf was converted for the platform and eventually released in a standalone edition. Sabre Wulf also appeared alongside Underwurlde, its sequel, in a Commodore 64 pack, and in the August 2015 Xbox One compilation of 30 Ultimate and Rare titles, Rare Replay.

== Reception ==
Reception

Review scores
Publication	Score
Crash	91%
Computer and Video Games	36/40
Sinclair User	8/10
Personal Computer Games	10/10
ZX Computing	5/5

Reviewers appreciated the graphics and found the gameplay similar to Ultimate's prior game, Atic Atac—particularly in its opening sequence and maze format—but preferred Sabre Wulf. (Note: Reviewers who likened Sabre Wulf's gameplay to Atic Atac include Computer and Video Games Crash, Sinclair User, ZX Computing, and in retrospect, Retro Gamer. Computer and Video Games and Personal Computer Games noted similarities in their opening sequences, and Crash and Retro Gamer noted similarities in their maze format. Personal Computer Games and Crash stated preferences for Sabre Wulf.) Critics also noted the game's difficulty and above-average pricing. (Note: Computer and Video Games and Popular Computing Weekly wrote on the game's difficulty, and Computer and Video Games, Crash, Popular Computing Weekly, and Sinclair User wrote on the game's above-average pricing.) Sabre Wulf received a Crash Smash award in July 1984, and was also a selected recommendation in Personal Computer Games (August 1984), and Popular Computing Weekly (June 1984). The game was named "Best Maze Game" in the 1984 Crash Readers Awards. Ultimate's new pricing strategy was a success and Sabre Wulf topped the sales chart in the video game format. While Retro Gamer reported that Sabre Wulf broke the company's sales records, Computer and Video Games (CVG) stated that the release underperformed prior games, with only 30,000 copies sold by December 1984. Eurogamer later said that 350,000 units were sold in total.

Crash confirmed rumours that the game was similar to Atic Atac, but declared Sabre Wulf the better and predicted they would have similar legacies. The magazine said their inability to intuit Sabreman's current inventory or resistance to damage added to the game's mystique, and that Ultimate was particularly skilled at not giving hints, but leaving sufficient clues through the game's design. Personal Computer Games found one such tip: that the indigenous enemies make a sound when aligned with an amulet piece. In a similar experience, Popular Computing Weekly slowly learned to use the orchids rather than avoid them. CVG described the instructions as "cryptic". Crash later reflected that comparisons to Atic Atac at its launch were unfair, similar to calling any two text adventures identical.

Critics had high praise for the colourful and detailed graphics and animations. In the opinion of CVG reviewers, Sabre Wulf carried Ultimate's momentum from Jetpac and Atic Atac, and had the best graphics of any ZX Spectrum game, with graphical detail that surpassed what previous reviewers considered the computer's limits. Sinclair User particularly liked how the hippo enemies force the player to vary their hack-and-slash gameplay style. A Crash reviewer called the game "a Software Masterpiece". The magazine received more mail in praise of Sabre Wulf in 1984 than for any other game and, a year later, repeated that Sabre Wulf was among the top games available for the Spectrum, saying the game did not feel antiquated. CVG's Commodore 64 review, two years after the original release, approved of the port and said the game remained a classic.

Reviewers complained of the game's high price, which was nearly double the average. Crash wondered if the cost might lead to more piracy. Critics also noted a bug in the two-player mode, repeat screens from elsewhere in the maze, and the frustratingly narrow window in which sabre swings register as enemy hits. CVG recommended drawing a map of the maze, without which it was easy to get lost. While Sabre Wulf had some flicker issues, said Sinclair User, the game altogether met Ultimate's high quality benchmarks.

A retrospective review from Retro Gamer reduced Sabre Wulf to "an interactive maze" packed with colour and hack-and-slash gameplay. The magazine likened the game's colour choice and setting to what the magazine considered Ultimate's best arcade game, Dingo (1983), and lamented Sabreman's inability to hit enemies above or below him. Eurogamer's Peter Parrish retrospectively found the collision detection imprecise as well. In The Routledge Companion to Video Game Studies, Simon Niedenthal used Sabre Wulf as an example of games that maximised the limited colour palette of 8-bit computers. He described its colours as "glow(ing) like stained glass, and the effects of color [sic] purity are enhanced by contrast with the black background".

== Legacy ==
Players and journalists consider the game to be among the Spectrum's best. Sabre Wulf was the first of four titles in the Sabreman series for the ZX Spectrum. Retro Gamer credited the character's name and character traits for its lasting memorability. As an ordinary human with a hat and exaggerated nose, Sabreman fit the video game 8-bit era's character archetype. The final, unreleased game in the Spectrum Sabreman series, Mire Mare, was planned to have been similar to Sabre Wulf in gameplay. Rare, the successor to Ultimate, later released a side-scrolling platformer in 2004 for the Game Boy Advance handheld console—also titled Sabre Wulf—in which Sabreman enlists jungle animals to solve the Sabre Wulf's puzzles. It was not received well by fans. Elements from the original Sabre Wulf appear in other games, including Rare's Jet Force Gemini and Killer Instinct, which features a character named Sabrewulf. Star Fox Adventures had at one point in development a character called Sabre the wolf. Retro Gamer considered Sabreman's recurring appearance to be proof of Rare's interest in the character and series.
