= Alien 8 =

1985 video game

- Developer: Tim and Chris Stamper
- Publisher: Ultimate Play the Game
- Engine: Filmation
- Platforms: ZX Spectrum; BBC Micro; Amstrad CPC; MSX
- Release: UK: 1985
- Genre: Action-adventure
- Mode: Single-player

Alien 8 is an action-adventure video game developed and published by Ultimate Play the Game. It was released for the ZX Spectrum, BBC Micro, Amstrad CPC and MSX in 1985. (Note: The game was first released for the ZX Spectrum, and was ported to the other formats later in 1985.) The game is a spiritual successor to the best-selling Knight Lore, which was lauded by critics for its isometric graphics. In the game, the player takes control of a robot, Alien 8, whose job is to ensure that all of the cryogenically frozen passengers on board a starship remain viable during the ship's voyage.

The game was written by Chris Stamper, and graphics were designed by Tim Stamper. Alien 8 uses the same image masking technique as Knight Lore, which allows the developers to create composite structures out of stacked images without visual overlay. The technique was copyrighted by Ultimate as the Filmation game engine. As with its spiritual predecessor, the game is rendered isometric projection. The game was critically acclaimed upon release. Reviewers praised the game's graphics and innovation, while minor criticism was directed at its similarities to Knight Lore.

== Plot ==
On a dying planet in a distant galaxy, the last of the creatures known as the "guardians" stored all of their libraries, records, and knowledge on a single starship together with cryogenically preserved members of their race. A single robot, Alien 8, is tasked with keeping the occupants of the vessel alive for the duration of its journey.

The ship is launched towards a new solar system and Alien 8 performs his task for thousands of years during the journey. However, as the ship nears its destination, it is attacked and boarded by hostile aliens. The cryogenic life support systems are damaged during the attack and Alien 8 must restore them to an operational status before the ship's automatic thrusting systems manoeuvre it into planetary orbit.

== Gameplay ==
The interface displays how many light years the starship is from its destination (ZX Spectrum).

The game is presented in an isometric format and set on board a starship. Taking on the role of the robot, Alien 8, the player must explore the large starship in order to ensure that the cryogenic life support systems preserving the biological crew are re-activated. The core of this system is a series of geometrically-shaped circuits. However, the circuits have been removed by the invading aliens and distributed around the starship. The main objective of the game is to collect the correct circuits and return them to their respective locations before the starship reaches its destination. The circuits are variously shaped as cubes, pyramids, domes or cylinders.

As with its spiritual predecessor, the environment of the game takes the form of a series of isometric flip-screen rooms (which trace the outline of a large starship). There are a total of 129 rooms and most are filled with various objects, such as moveable platforms, static hazards such as spikes and hostile aliens. As well as executing well-timed manoeuvres and jumps, the player is able to use starship props to block or defend themselves. Another feature is the use of remote controlled drones, which can be directed by Alien 8 into inaccessible or dangerous areas.

== Development ==
Development of Alien 8 began immediately after the release of Knight Lore, in which the Stamper brothers predicted that publishers would attempt to copy Knight Lore's Filmation technology in other games. As with its predecessor, the Stamper brothers developed the game in monochrome to avoid attribute clash, a common limitation in some early 8-bit home computers. However, the Amstrad release exclusively displayed dual-colours. In 2019 an unofficial port for the Commodore 64 range was released.

== Reception ==
Reception

Review scores
Publication	Score
Crash	95%
Amstrad Action	96%
Amtix!	92%

Awards
Publication	Award
Crash	Crash Smash
C+VG	Star Game

Alien 8 entered the Gallup Top 30 sales chart at number one for the week ending 19 February 1985, replacing Ghostbusters after 13 weeks. After a second week at the top, it was replaced by Football Manager.

The game was critically acclaimed upon release. A reviewer of Crash praised its graphics and presentation, stating them to be "excellent" and more "imaginative and pleasing" compared to its predecessor, despite regarding it as "only having a slight difference". Amstrad Action similarly praised the graphics, citing them as "amazing", "brilliant" and having "great" colour combinations. (Note: The Amstrad version of Alien 8 was not released in monochrome.) A reviewer of Amtix! stated that the visuals were "breathtakingly stunning" and improves on its predecessor. David Kelly of Popular Computing Weekly stated the game was a "little" disappointing due to its similarities to Knight Lore, but asserted that the graphics were of superior quality to its predecessor. Chris Bourne of Sinclair User stated that the general quality of graphics were "higher" than its predecessor, although it used an identical system.

Crash praised the new additions to the game, in particular the time limit and various collectable items. The reviewer wrote that the new features were "compelling and exciting", as it differs from its predecessor. A reviewer of Amstrad Action similarly praised its innovation, stating that it has "wonderfully" original ideas, despite criticising it similarities to Knight Lore. Kelly praised the game's extra puzzles and the animation of enemies, heralding them as "brilliant". Bourne similarly praised the 3D animation, writing that every extension of the game improved over Knight Lore.
