= World Cup Italia '90 =

1990 video game

- Master System Cover art
- Developer: Sega
- Publisher: Sega
- Series: FIFA World Cup
- Platforms: Master System, Mega Drive
- Release: Master System: EU: December 1990; Mega Drive: EU: 1990
- Genre: Sports
- Modes: Single-player, Multiplayer

World Cup Italia '90 is a football video game by Sega for Master System and Mega Drive in 1990. The Mega Drive version is the European release of World Championship Soccer. The Master System version was released in Brazil as Super Futebol II.

== Summary ==
Only the Master System game gives official groups, teams and the fidelity schedule of the championship. Gameplay occurs at a bird's-eye view and sees the player given the choice of participating as any of the teams that featured in the tournament itself (excluding the Republic of Ireland), and no qualifying tournaments to reach the World Cup are available on this game.

The Mega Drive version was later renamed to Sega Soccer on the Mega 6 compilation cartridge removing the Virgin Mastertronic credits.

In Brazil, the Master System version was released as a Master System exclusive with the name Super Futebol II. Super Futebol had been the name used in Brazil for World Championship Soccer.

== Official license ==
Virgin Mastertronic owned the home license for the official video game of the 1990 World Cup. This was used on their self-developed games for home computers under the title World Cup Soccer: Italia '90. They also published Sega games in Europe so used the licence for the different games for the Sega consoles.

This is the second licensed game based on the FIFA World Cup featuring the official logo and the mascot, the first having been the ill-fated World Cup Carnival for the 1986 FIFA World Cup.

== Reception ==
Reception of the Master System version was mixed. Mean Machines awarded it 51%, criticising the controls and small playing area, while Raze gave it 84%, praising its two-player action. Computer and Video Games awarded it 44%.

The Mega Drive version received generally positive reviews from European publications. In the United Kingdom, Computer and Video Games awarded the game 83%, praising its large number of options, graphics and accessibility, and described it as a high-quality football game that Mega Drive owners should not miss.

French magazine Joystick awarded it 85%, praising the variety of teams, formations and competitions and considering the Mega Drive's first football simulation a success. German magazine Power Play gave the game 76%, highlighting its World Cup format and range of match situations while being less impressed by its audiovisual presentation.

In Spain, Hobby Consolas retrospectively awarded the game 83%, describing it as the most complete Mega Drive football game available before the arrival of Super Kick Off. The magazine particularly praised its range of options and different perspectives used for set pieces, although it considered the on-field action less impressive than its presentation.

Mega who had awarded the game a 40%, would place the game at #5 in their list of the 10 Worst Mega Drive Games of All Time.

=== Commercial performance ===
In France, the Mega Drive version retained a presence in Mega Force magazine's popularity rankings more than two years after the 1990 FIFA World Cup, placing eighth in September 1992 and seventh in October.

== See also ==
There are other unofficial Italia '90 games: Italy 1990, Italy '90 Soccer and Italia 1990.
