= Barmy Burgers =

1983 video game

- Developers: Gary Capewell; Gary Sewell
- Publishers: Blaby Computer Games (UK); Ventamatic (Spain)
- Platforms: ZX Spectrum, Dragon 32/64
- Release: EU: 1983
- Genre: Platform

Barmy Burgers is a platform game written for the ZX Spectrum by Gary Capewell and Gary Sewell and published in 1983 by Blaby Computer Games in the UK and Ventamatic in Spain. It is a clone of the 1982 Data East arcade video game BurgerTime.

== Gameplay ==
All burgers have been assembled, completing the level

The player is a chef attempting to create three larger-than-life-sized hamburgers on a level made of horizontal platforms and connecting ladders. Walking over an ingredient causes it to drop onto lower platforms until complete sandwiches are formed at the bottom of the screen. Sausages and fried eggs chase the player; if they touch the chef, a life is lost. Throwing pepper on a pursuer briefly stuns it.

== Reception ==
Crash praised the game for its sound and graphics, while Computer and Video Games said that "Barmy Burgers is a good game for any Spectrum-owning Burgertime fan."

In 2010, 1Up.com included Barmy Burgers on a list of the "most egregious videogame ripoffs".

== See also ==
- Mr. Wimpy
- Bear Bovver
