= World Cup Soccer: Italia '90 =

1990 video game

- ZX Spectrum box art
- Developer: Virgin Mastertronic
- Series: FIFA World Cup
- Platforms: Amiga, Amstrad CPC, Atari ST, Commodore 64, MS-DOS, MSX, ZX Spectrum
- Release: 1990
- Genre: Sports
- Modes: Single-player, multiplayer

World Cup Soccer: Italia '90 is a football video game released for various home computers in 1990 by Virgin Mastertronic. It is the officially licensed game of the tournament. It was known simply as Italia '90 for the Tronix budget reissues.

Different games were also released by Virgin Mastertronic for Sega consoles as World Cup Italia '90.

This is the second licensed game based on the FIFA World Cup featuring the official logo and the mascot, the first having been the ill-fated World Cup Carnival for the 1986 FIFA World Cup.

== Development ==
The game was based on the 1989 game World Trophy Soccer which was originally an arcade video game for Mastertronic's Amiga-based Arcadia machines. Virgin Games had bought out Mastertronic in 1988 so the game was released for Amiga, Atari ST and Commodore 64 published by Virgin Mastertronic.

Virgin Mastertronic obtained the official licence for the World Cup from sponsor Olivetti. They adapted the World Trophy Soccer game, renaming it World Cup Soccer: Italia '90 while also converting it to Amstrad CPC, MS-DOS and ZX Spectrum. No attempts were made to change the set-up of the tournament or teams available to match the actual 1990 World Cup.

This game was the last FIFA World Cup title to include a separate team from East Germany.

== Gameplay ==
The game is presented in a bird's-eye view but when the player gets near the goal, it switches to a 3D view of the penalty area and the player must try to score before a defender arrives on screen.

The player can only choose to play as England, Belgium, Italy or Spain. The teams do not have the correct coloured strips and the tournament is not the same as the actual World Cup.

== Reception ==
The game received mixed reviews. Amiga Action gave an overall score of 62% but their reviewers were split. Reviewer Alex said "The graphics are well implemented, and I was impressed by the use of first-person perspective when shooting or saving a goal" but reviewer Doug concluded "I've played my fair share of soccer games, and this World Cup tie-in is certainly not the best. The game is quite hard to get the hang of, but even when you do get used to the controls the game still doesn't play that well".

Zzap! gave scores of 44% for the Amiga version and 42% for the Commodore 64. While praise was given for the graphics, the review was overwhelmingly negative with complaints focusing on the 3D goalmouth section which they said "doesn't really work and is unfair anyway" but mostly that despite being the officially licensed game, it did not accurately reflect the tournament: "Can someone tell me what this has to do with the World Cup? It may be the official licence but it lacks the official fixtures and teams!".

The game became a best seller, being the number one selling Spectrum game in August and September 1990.

== See also ==
There were also unofficial Italia '90 games including Italy 1990 (published by U.S. Gold who released the official games for both the 1986 and 1994 tournaments), Italy '90 Soccer (which had been released in Italy in 1988) and Italia 1990 from budget publisher Codemasters.
