= Planet of Death =

Planet of Death may refer to:

- POD (video game), short for Planet of Death, a 1997 video game
- Adventure A: Planet of Death, a 1981 video game
- Planet of Death (novel), a 1967 novel by Robert Silverberg
