= 2006 FIFA World Cup (video game) =

2006 video game

- UK cover art featuring Frank Lampard
- Developers: EA Canada; Exient Entertainment (handhelds)
- Publisher: EA Sports
- Series: FIFA World Cup
- Platforms: Microsoft Windows; PlayStation 2; PlayStation Portable; Xbox; Xbox 360; Nintendo DS; Game Boy Advance; GameCube; Mobile phone
- Release: NA: 24 April 2006; JP: 27 April 2006 (PS2, PC, X360); EU: 28 April 2006; Mobile: JP: 18 May 2006; NA: 6 June 2006; PlayStation Portable: EU: 19 May 2006; NA: 22 May 2006; JP: 1 June 2006; KO: 1 June 2006
- Genre: Sports
- Modes: Single-player, multiplayer

2006 FIFA World Cup (known as FIFA World Cup: Germany 2006) is the official video game for the 2006 FIFA World Cup, published by EA Sports. 2006 FIFA World Cup was released on GameCube, PlayStation 2, Xbox, Xbox 360, Game Boy Advance, Nintendo DS, PlayStation Portable and Microsoft Windows across 2006.

== Gameplay ==
The game allows players to participate in the 2006 FIFA World Cup held in Germany by taking control of one of 127 national teams. It features more game options than previous release 2002 FIFA World Cup. It even includes a satellite map when choosing countries to play in a Friendly. Online support is provided for ranked and unranked matches on most non-Nintendo platforms. The online service provides lobbies, leaderboards and a global challenge mode where the player can play through over forty historical World Cup scenarios, with the opportunity to explore alternate outcomes for each one. The online servers for 2006 FIFA World Cup shut down on 1 September 2007.

By playing online and in single-player mode, spending points for the virtual store are earned, where players can purchase uniforms, historical players, various footballs, boots, and gameplay options. As with the previous World Cup video game, matches in World Cup mode are played in the same order as at the World Cup in Germany.

== Release ==
Ten region-specific covers were released, each featuring a major player from each region. Microsoft bundled the game with the Xbox 360 in Japan. In this featured bundle, there was a limited edition faceplate included from Adidas packaged inside.

== Reception ==
Reception

Aggregate scores
| Aggregator | Score | | | | | | | |
| Aggregator | DS | GBA | GameCube | PC | PS2 | PSP | Xbox | Xbox 360 |
|---|---|---|---|---|---|---|---|---|
| GameRankings | 62% | 52% | 74% | 77% | 76% | 73% | 77% | 74% |
| Metacritic | 71/100 | 57/100 | 76/100 | 77/100 | 77/100 | 72/100 | 77/100 | 72/100 |

Review scores
| Publication | Score | | | | | | | |
| Publication | DS | GBA | GameCube | PC | PS2 | PSP | Xbox | Xbox 360 |
|---|---|---|---|---|---|---|---|---|
| Eurogamer | N/A | N/A | N/A | N/A | N/A | N/A | N/A | 7/10 |
| Famitsu | N/A | N/A | N/A | N/A | 31/40 | N/A | N/A | N/A |
| Game Informer | N/A | N/A | 8.5/10 | N/A | 8.5/10 | N/A | 8.5/10 | 8.5/10 |
| GamePro | N/A | N/A | N/A | N/A | 4.5/5 | N/A | N/A | 4.5/5 |
| GameSpot | 7/10 | 4.3/10 | 8/10 | 8.1/10 | 7.7/10 | 8.4/10 | 7.8/10 | 8.2/10 |
| GameSpy | N/A | N/A | 4/5 | N/A | 4/5 | 3/5 | 4/5 | 3/5 |
| GameZone | N/A | N/A | N/A | N/A | 8/10 | 8.5/10 | 8.5/10 | 8.3/10 |
| IGN | 7.5/10 | N/A | 8/10 | 8.4/10 | 8.4/10 | 7.8/10 | 8.4/10 | 8.4/10 |
| Nintendo Power | 7/10 | 7.5/10 | 7.5/10 | N/A | N/A | N/A | N/A | N/A |
| Official U.S. PlayStation Magazine | N/A | N/A | N/A | N/A | 4/5 | 2.5/5 | N/A | N/A |
| Official Xbox Magazine (US) | N/A | N/A | N/A | N/A | N/A | N/A | 7/10 | 7.5/10 |
| PC Gamer (US) | N/A | N/A | N/A | 70% | N/A | N/A | N/A | N/A |
| The A.V. Club | N/A | N/A | B | N/A | B | N/A | B | N/A |
| Detroit Free Press | N/A | N/A | N/A | N/A | N/A | N/A | N/A | 3/4 |

The PC, Xbox, PlayStation 2 and GameCube versions received "generally favorable reviews", while the Xbox 360, PSP, DS and Game Boy Advance versions received "mixed or average reviews" according to video game review aggregator Metacritic. In Japan, Famitsu gave the PS2 version a score of three eights and one seven for a total of 31 out of 40.

The Times gave the PS2 version a score of four stars out of five and stated that "The classic moment section, which features 125 well-known situations, is one of several nice touches in this game."The A.V. Club gave the game a B and said that it "supplies just enough vicarious excitement to bridge the gap between now and early June." Detroit Free Press gave the X360 version three stars out of four and stated: "Thankfully for the folks at Electronic Arts, the only soccer competition available on the Xbox 360 is the previous FIFA game, and this World Cup edition is a step up from that incarnation, albeit a small one." However, The Sydney Morning Herald gave the game three-and-a-half stars out of five and called it "a fun football simulation for newcomers and the best FIFA of recent years. Even so, competitor "Pro Evolution" still has the virtual World Cup firmly in its grasp."

IGN gave the mobile version a score of 5.8 out of 10 and called it "a stop-gap product designed to reel in World Cup fans based on the hype of the world's biggest sporting event. And that's not necessarily a bad idea -- having the entire tournament set up from the get-go -- but the execution isn't worth your download dollars."

The game sold 2.8 million copies.

== See also ==
- FIFA 06: Road to FIFA World Cup
- FIFA World Cup video games
