= FIFA 06: Road to FIFA World Cup =

2005 video game

- Cover art featuring Ronaldinho
- Developer: EA Canada
- Publisher: EA Sports
- Series: FIFA; FIFA World Cup
- Platform: Xbox 360
- Release: NA: 22 November 2005; EU: 2 December 2005; JP: 10 December 2005
- Genre: Sports
- Modes: Single player, multiplayer, multiplayer online

FIFA 06: Road to FIFA World Cup is a video game developed by EA Sports for the Xbox 360. The game is an officially licensed product of the 2006 FIFA World Cup finals held in Germany. FIFA 06: Road to FIFA World Cup World Cup mode only includes UEFA qualification groups for the 2006 World Cup, with 20 national teams from the other five continental zones to form the full tournament once the qualifying phase is concluded.

Released in 2005, this was the first FIFA game for a 7th-generation console. Road to FIFA World Cup is an Xbox 360 exclusive and preceded the release of 2006 FIFA World Cup game on the PS2, Xbox, Xbox 360 and other consoles by several months. It offers superior graphics to previous versions, though at the expense of many gameplay features. For the first time in the FIFA series, it allows the player to practise shooting against the goalkeeper while each match is loading.

== Reception ==
Reception

Aggregate scores
Aggregator	Score
GameRankings	62.55%
Metacritic	62/100

Review scores
Publication	Score
Eurogamer	2/10
Game Informer	8.25/10
GamePro	3/5
GameRevolution	C
GameSpot	6/10
GameSpy	2.5/5
GameTrailers	6/10
GameZone	7.5/10
IGN	6.9/10
Official Xbox Magazine (US)	6.5/10
Detroit Free Press	2/4

The game was met with mixed reception upon release, as GameRankings gave it a score of 62.55%, while Metacritic gave it 62 out of 100.

== See also ==
- FIFA 06
- 2006 FIFA World Cup (video game)
