= BurgerTime World Tour =

2011 video game

- Developer: Frozen Codebase
- Publishers: Konami; MonkeyPaw Games
- Series: BurgerTime
- Platforms: Xbox 360, PlayStation 3, Wii
- Release: Xbox 360; November 2, 2011; PS3: NA: November 15, 2011; PAL: March 28, 2012; Wii; February 9, 2012
- Genre: Platform
- Modes: Single-player, multiplayer

BurgerTime World Tour is a platform game in the BurgerTime series, developed by Frozen Codebase and digitally published by Konami via MonkeyPaw Games for Xbox 360, PlayStation 3, and Wii in 2011–2012. The game was delisted from the Xbox Live and WiiWare digital storefronts in April 2014 due to an expiring license between publisher MonkeyPaw Games and IP owner G-Mode.

== Reception ==
Reception

Aggregate score
Aggregator	Score
Metacritic	(X360) 55/100 (PS3) 50/100 (Wii) 30/100

Review scores
Publication	Score
Edge	(X360) 4/10
Eurogamer	(X360) 3/10
GamePro	(X360) 3.5/5
GameSpot	5/10
GameZone	(X360) 7.5/10
Giant Bomb	(X360) 3/5
IGN	(X360) 5.5/10
Nintendo Life	(Wii) 3/10
Official Xbox Magazine (US)	(X360) 4.5/10
PlayStation: The Official Magazine	(PS3) 6/10

The PlayStation 3 and Xbox 360 versions received "mixed" reviews, while the Wii version received "unfavorable" reviews, according to the review aggregation website Metacritic.

Since its release, the Xbox 360 version sold 7,008 units worldwide by the end of 2011.
