= FIFA World Cup video games =

FIFA World Cup
- Genre: Sports
- Developers: Tiertex Design Studios; EA Vancouver
- Publisher: EA Sports
- Platform: Various
- First release: World Cup Carnival; 1986
- Latest release: Various games 2026

FIFA has licensed FIFA World Cup video games since 1986, of which only a few were received positively by the critics, but given the popularity of the competition, they all did positively on the market, and the license is one of the most sought after. Originally in the hands of U.S. Gold, later Electronic Arts acquired it in 1997 to 2023.

== World Cup Carnival (Mexico '86) ==
World Cup Carnival, was released by U.S. Gold, for the Commodore 64, the ZX Spectrum and the Amstrad CPC. While the license was acquired with time to spare, internal problems plagued the project's development. As the 1986 FIFA World Cup was coming closer, U.S. Gold decided to acquire the rights of an older game, World Cup Football by Artic, re-fit it with the properly licensed items, and market it as a new title, but this late effort was received with criticism from gamers, retailers and reviewers alike.

== World Cup Soccer: Italia '90 ==
Virgin Mastertronic released the official home computer game of the 1990 World Cup for Amiga, Amstrad CPC, Atari ST, Commodore 64, IBM PC compatibles, and ZX Spectrum. Like the 1986 game, this was actually a reworked existing game (World Trophy Soccer). The game is presented in a bird's-eye view but when the player gets near the goal, it switches to a 3D view of the penalty area and the player must try to score before a defender arrives on screen. The player can only choose to play as England, Belgium, Italy or Spain. The teams do not have the correct colored strips and the tournament is not the same as the actual World Cup.

Virgin also released official console games in Europe as World Cup Italia '90 for the Mega Drive and Master System consoles. The Mega Drive version is a port of World Championship Soccer. The Master System version was another game, also released as Super Futebol II in Brazil.

A number of unofficial games were also released including Italy 1990 by previous license holders U.S. Gold.

== World Cup USA '94 ==
This game from U.S. Gold was ported to most active platforms of the day: DOS, Amiga, Genesis / Mega Drive, Sega CD, Master System, Super Nintendo Entertainment System, Game Boy, and Game Gear. The Sega CD version includes a CD soundtrack including two songs by the Scorpions and FMV views of 3D renders of the stadiums used in the competition.

== World Cup 98 (France) ==
For the first time in a football game, accurate national team kits were introduced complete with kit manufacturer logos and official merchandise. The game built on the previously released FIFA: Road to World Cup 98 engine, although it features some minor gameplay improvements such as in-game strategy changes and more tactically accurate player positioning. As in the FIFA series, World Cup 98 features a song in the menu: "Tubthumping", by Chumbawamba. The game also features voice-overs by Des Lynam and Gary Lineker in the team schedules. The World Cup classic mode is also an interesting feature, with classic black and white sepia-toned graphics and commentary by Kenneth Wolstenholme creating the feeling of watching an old World Cup game. The playable teams also included several nations that did not qualify for the finals, but were considered too important to exclude. It was released for Windows, PlayStation, Nintendo 64 and Game Boy.

== Jikkyō World Soccer: World Cup France 98 ==
In Japan, Konami was granted the FIFA World Cup licence to produce the Nintendo 64 video game Jikkyō World Soccer: World Cup France 98. It was developed by Konami's Osaka based team, KCEO, and was only released in Japan. This was released in the rest of the world as International Superstar Soccer '98, without the official FIFA World Cup licence, branding or real player names.

== World Soccer Jikkyō Winning Eleven 3: World Cup France '98 ==
In Japan, Konami was granted the FIFA World Cup licence to produce the PlayStation video game World Soccer Jikkyō Winning Eleven 3: World Cup France '98. It was developed by Konami's Tokyo based team, KCET, and was only released in Japan. This was released in the rest of the world as International Superstar Soccer Pro '98, without the official FIFA World Cup licence, branding or real player names.

== World Cup '98 France: Road to Win ==
In Japan, Sega was granted the FIFA World Cup licence to produce the Saturn video game World Cup '98 France: Road to Win.

== 2002 FIFA World Cup (Korea/Japan) ==
An amalgamation between the game engines of FIFA Football 2002 and FIFA Football 2003, the game still incorporates the power bar for shots and crosses but with a steeper learning curve and higher chances of being penalized by the match referee. The national team kits are accurate along with player likeness and the stadia of the 2002 FIFA World Cup. Unlike the previous games in the FIFA series, the game had an original soundtrack performed by the Vancouver Symphony Orchestra.

It was released for Microsoft Windows, PlayStation, PlayStation 2, GameCube, and Xbox. The game was a launch title for GameCube in Europe.

== 2006 FIFA World Cup (Germany) ==
Created by EA Sports and released during the last two weeks of April 2006, this game features not only the World Cup finals themselves, but the six regional qualification rounds. There are 127 national teams. The players can also create a player and put in their favorite team. There are minor improvements in the game play over FIFA 06. The Global Challenge Mode includes 40 challenges based upon classic matches of the World Cup or qualification matches. Penalty Shoot-Out mode offers a more realistic experience.

== 2010 FIFA World Cup (South Africa) ==
Released in April 2010, the game contains 199 of the 204 national teams that took part in the 2010 FIFA World Cup qualification process. Electronic Arts stated that they have included every team that FIFA have permitted them to use, with some others not being allowed for "various reasons". The five teams that were in the draw for World Cup qualifying but are not included in the game are African teams Central African Republic, Eritrea, and São Tomé and Príncipe, and Asian teams Bhutan and Guam. All five withdrew from the qualifying stage before it began. Additionally, the game does not feature Brunei, Laos, Papua New Guinea, and the Philippines who did not participate in World Cup qualifying.

The game includes all 10 venues used at the 2010 FIFA World Cup, as well as stadiums from each qualifying region and a range of "generic" stadiums.

== 2014 FIFA World Cup (Brazil) ==
The game contains all of the 203 national teams that took part in the 2014 FIFA World Cup qualification process. The national teams of Bhutan, Brunei, Guam, Mauritania and South Sudan, all of which did not participate in World Cup qualifying, and Mauritius, that withdrew before playing any match, are not featured in the game.

The game includes all 12 venues used at the 2014 FIFA World Cup, as well as stadiums from each qualifying region and a range of "generic" stadiums.

There's also an EA-licensed collectible card game for Android and iOS: 2014 FIFA World Cup Brazil World-class Soccer. The game is released in Japan and mainland China only.

The game has been criticized for being available on only a few platforms. Acknowledging the criticism, EA released a free update for the PlayStation 4 and Xbox One versions of FIFA 14 that includes 2014 FIFA World Cup game mode in May. This mode only features Friendly Match, Challenges and Ultimate Team. EA also released a 2014 FIFA World Cup update for FIFA Online 3 in the same month, with several modes such as Tournament Mode, Ultimate Team, Manager Mode and Challenges.

== FIFA 18 DLC (Russia) ==
EA released free expansion for FIFA 18 based on the 2018 FIFA World Cup in May 2018, featuring all 32 participating teams (and the ones already featured in FIFA 18) and all 12 stadiums used at the 2018 FIFA World Cup. There is no regional qualifying rounds that lead up to the World Cup to be feature on this DLC like there was for the previous three World Cup games. It was released for PlayStation 4, Xbox One, Windows and Nintendo Switch, with an update to mobile devices later, on 6 June, and an update to FIFA Online 4 on 31 May. Coins transfer over from the actual Ultimate Team game and there is no transfer market, meaning all players have to be obtained from packs.

== FIFA 23 DLC (Qatar) ==
FIFA 23 features both men's and women's World Cup game modes, replicating the 2022 FIFA World Cup and the 2023 FIFA Women's World Cup. Once again this expansion does not feature a World Cup qualification mode that leads to the actual World Cup itself and only offers the tournament with the participating teams just like the previous 2018 DLC edition. Unlike the previous World Cup games, this mode doesn't include all tournament stadiums, as it includes only two out of eight stadiums.

== 2026 FIFA World Cup ==
=== Licensed games ===
On October 2, 2025, FIFA announced the video game FIFA Heroes, scheduled for release in 2026 on Android, iOS, Nintendo Switch, PlayStation, and Xbox platforms.

In May 2026, the Football Manager 26 video game also announced the addition of licensed 2026 FIFA World Cup content.

In December 2025, Netflix announced a new simulation-type game featuring the World Cup, produced by Delphi Interactive and Refactor Games. In May 2026, it was announced the Netflix-published game would be titled "FIFA World Cup – Launch Edition" and would be released on June 11 2026.

In the same May 2026 announcement, FIFA also confirmed that they would adopt a non-exclusive "Digital Football" ecosystem, with games of various genres adopting the FIFA license. Games mentioned alongside the new World Cup game were FIFA Heroes, FIFA Rivals, FIFA Super Soccer, Football Manager, eFootball and Rocket League, with more games joining the ecosystem in the following months.

=== Unlicensed games ===
In May 2026, it was announced that an unlicensed 2026 FIFA World Cup mode, titled The World's Game, would be added to the EA Sports FC 26 video game on June 4, 2026, with 53 fully licensed and playable national teams (41 of which are competing in the World Cup), two non-licensed teams with authentic players (Egypt and Japan), five non-licensed generic squads (Algeria, Curaçao, Iran, Iraq, and Jordan), and new World Cup stadiums.

== FIFA Women's World Cup video games ==
Mia Hamm Soccer 64 was the first major standalone women's soccer video game, while FIFA 16 was the first of the FIFA series to include women's national teams. The FIFA 19 downloadable update allowed users to play only the 2019 FIFA Women's World Cup Final, and FIFA 23 featured women's club football, the UEFA Women's Champions League, and the Women's World Cup tournament mode for the first time in the FIFA series, replicating the 2023 FIFA Women's World Cup and becoming EA Sports' most expansive FIFA Women's World Cup update to date.

== See also ==
- UEFA European Championship video games
- UEFA Champions League video games
- Olympics in video games
