= Aerial perspective (disambiguation) =

Aerial perspective or atmospheric perspective is the effect on the appearance of an object by the atmosphere between it and a viewer.

Aerial perspective may also refer to:

- aerial photography
- aerial landscape art
- bird's-eye view, elevated view of an object from above
- top-down perspective
