= Italy 1990 (video game) =

1990 video game

- Developer: Tiertex Design Studios
- Publisher: U.S. Gold
- Platforms: Amiga, Amstrad CPC, Atari ST, Commodore 64, MS-DOS, ZX Spectrum
- Release: 1990
- Genre: Sports

Italy 1990 is a soccer video game developed by Tiertex Design Studios and published by U.S. Gold in 1990. It features the 1990 FIFA World Cup held in Italy but is not part of the official FIFA World Cup series. It was released for Amiga, Amstrad CPC, Atari ST, Commodore 64, ZX Spectrum, and MS-DOS. For the American market it was branded as World Class Soccer. In Europe—outside the UK—it was released as Italia 1990 by U.S. Gold in association with Erbe Software.

U.S. Gold had released the official game of the previous World Cup in 1986 (World Cup Carnival) which was extremely badly received, and would go on to release World Cup USA '94 as the official game of the 1994 World Cup. The official 1990 World Cup licence was acquired by Virgin Mastertronic who produced two titles, World Cup Soccer: Italia '90 for home computers and World Cup Italia '90 for Sega consoles.

== Reception ==
Reception

Award
Publication	Award
Amstrad Action	Mastergame

Computer Gaming World criticised the game for only displaying about 10% of the field at a time without a "radar" screen to show the rest, but liked the animation. The magazine concluded that "World Class Soccer should prove an informative and reasonably entertaining way to prepare for the event".

== See also ==
- Italia 1990
- Italy '90 Soccer
- World Cup Italia '90
