= Curse of the Seven Faces =

1984 video game

- Title screen
- Developer(s): Alan McDonald; Peter Galbavy
- Publisher(s): Classic Computing (1984); Imperial Software (1985); Artic Computing (1986)
- Platform(s): ZX Spectrum
- Release: EU: 1984
- Genre(s): Interactive fiction
- Mode(s): Single-player

Curse of the Seven Faces is an interactive fiction video game published by Classic Computing for the ZX Spectrum in 1984. It was re-released later in 1985 by Imperial Software. The game was included in a compilation titled Assemblage in 1986 with three other games. It was published by Artic Computing.

== Gameplay ==
The objective of the game is to retrieve four objects from an evil wizard: his spell book, staff, hat, and cloak. The game had a unique save system at the time: the user has the option to save the game to memory instead to the tape. This was faster than the normal save system.

== Reception ==
Reception

Review scores
Publication	Score
Crash	7/10
Computer and Video Games	7/10
Sinclair User	5/10
Home Computing Weekly	1/5
Personal Computer Games	6/10

Computer and Video Games wrote: "A variety of original locations, and some surprise ways of finding new exits, combined with well-written and fairly lengthy descriptions to make an interesting game". Crash said the plot was "weak and thin" but the location descriptions "are really quite impressive". Sinclair User called the game "disappointing but attractively produced". Your Spectrum gave a negative review and was unimpressed with the parser: "Once you've read 'You Cannot Do That' and 'Nothing Exciting Happens' for the umpteenth time in a row, you begin to believe it — nothing ever exciting happens!" Personal Computer Games called it "an enjoyable adventure". Popular Computing Weekly called it "an extremely well-crafted Adventure". Assemblage collection received four out five stars in Sinclair User.
