= Dimension Destructors =

1983 video game

- Developer: Artic Computing
- Publisher: Artic Computing
- Platform: ZX Spectrum
- Release: 1983
- Genre: Shoot 'em up
- Mode: Single-player

Dimension Destructors is a 1983 video game developed by Artic Computing for the ZX Spectrum. The game, programmed by Jon Ritman, was one of the first games, alongside Ritman's earlier Combat Zone, to use 3D effects on the Spectrum. Dimension Destructors received positive reviews, with several reviewers highlighting the game's graphics.

== Gameplay ==
Gameplay screenshot

Dimension Destructors is a shoot 'em up video game in which the objective is to defeat as many alien vehicles in a space battle as possible before all lives are lost. Players use directional keys to align with enemy fighters, represented by three-dimensional pyramid and diamond shapes, and shoot them with their laser. Players must avoid enemy shots, which deplete a shield when hit, and when four shields over five lives are depleted, the game is over. An onscreen scanner displays the direction of incoming vehicles, which approach the player from a distance.

== Development and release ==
Dimension Destructors was created by Jon Ritman for publisher Artic Computing. It was the first original game that Ritman developed. After seeing the arcade game Battlezone, he designed the engine using vector graphics and floating-point mathematics he learned writing Combat Zone. Alongside Combat Zone, Ritman stated that the game was one of the first to attempt 3D effects on the Spectrum.

== Reception ==
Reception

Review scores
Publication	Score
Crash	68%
Personal Computer Games	7/10
Personal Computer News	4/5
TV Gamer	3/5
ZX Computing	90%

According to Personal Computer News, sales of Dimension Destructors in the United Kingdom peaked in twentieth place in January 1984. The game received generally positive reviews, with reviewers highlighting the game's 3D graphics. Bob Chappell of Personal Computer News found the game impressive, praising the "realistic perspective" of the graphics. Describing the 3D graphics as exemplary, ZX Computing praised the "fast and smooth" visuals and "addictive" gameplay. However, Personal Computer Games Magazine stated the 3D imposed "considerable constraints" on graphical details, and found the game's concept to be "amazingly unoriginal". Crash praised the game for its controls, animations, and effects, but found the game difficult, and considered its the lack of colors and background landscapes made it "less spectacular" than its predecessor Combat Zone.
