= Bear Bovver =

1983 video game

- C64 box art
- Publisher: Artic Computing
- Designer: Jon Ritman
- Platforms: ZX Spectrum, Commodore 64
- Release: 1983: ZX Spectrum; 1984: C64
- Genre: Platform
- Mode: Single-player

Bear Bovver is a platform game written by Jon Ritman for the ZX Spectrum and published in 1983 by Artic Computing. A Commodore 64 port was released in 1984. Bear Bovver is a BurgerTime clone, where batteries take the place of the burger ingredients.

== Gameplay ==
Ted's Sinclair electric truck has broken down and needs new batteries. Ted must climb up the scaffolding and collect the batteries for his electric car. However, there are bovver bears around the site and if they get near, they will capture him. To get rid of them, Ted must use time bombs that are scattered around the site. Once all the batteries for the car he been collected, the player moves on to the next level.

The game also includes "Baby Bear Mode" in which a player can collect batteries and move around the site without ever getting captured.

== Development ==
After seeing BurgerTime and hearing that Sinclair were talking about the release of an electric car, Jon Ritman decided to combine the concepts to create Bear Bovver. He began to use a more complex development system, joining 2 Spectrums and 3 Microdrives. He developed on one Spectrum and tested the game on the other. This allowed the games being developed to be larger. It was published by Artic Computing for the ZX Spectrum in 1983 and 1984 for the Commodore 64.

== Reception ==
Reception

Award
Publication	Award
Crash	Smash!

Bear Bovver received generally positive reception. Crash staff praised the animation and sound, and called the game "enjoyable" and "addictive". Sinclair User called the premise "brilliant" and stated that it would likely stand among players' top 10 ZX Spectrum games. Computer and Video Games felt it was a good fit for younger players, especially because of the practice mode.

== See also ==
- Barmy Burgers
- Mr. Wimpy
