= Adventure A: Planet of Death =

1981 video game

- Cover art by Tony Roberts
- Developer: Artic Computing
- Publisher: Artic Computing
- Designers: Richard Turner; Chris A. Thornton
- Platforms: ZX80, ZX81, ZX Spectrum, Commodore 64, Amstrad CPC
- Release: 1981: ZX80, ZX81; 1982: Spectrum; 1984: C64; 1985: Amstrad CPC
- Genre: Interactive fiction
- Mode: Single-player

Adventure A: Planet of Death is a text adventure from Artic Computing published for the ZX80 and ZX81 in 1981. Releases followed for the ZX Spectrum (1982), Commodore 64 (1984), and Amstrad CPC (1985). The game was followed by Adventures B, C, D, E, F, G, and H.

Adventure A was re-released for iOS and Android.

== Plot ==
The player takes over the role of a spaceship pilot who is stranded on an alien planet. The aim is to escape from this planet by finding his or her captured and disabled spaceship.

== Development ==
In 2013 a game version for iOS devices was released. An Android version followed in 2020.

== Reception ==
Crash magazine wrote that the game was "good value", complimenting its tone as "atmospheric" and "chilling". British magazine Home Computing Weekly reported that Planet of Death followed a traditional adventure format. The magazine depicted the parser as fast but primitive. Editor Ray Elder judged that solving the game's puzzles was a very satisfying experience for him, make him "love" the game.
