= World Cup Carnival =

1986 video game

- Cover art
- Developer: Artic Computing
- Publisher: U.S. Gold
- Series: FIFA World Cup
- Platforms: Amstrad CPC; Commodore 64; ZX Spectrum
- Release: 1986
- Genre: Traditional football simulation
- Modes: Single-player; Multiplayer

World Cup Carnival is a 1986 sports video game developed by Artic Computing and published by U.S. Gold for the Amstrad CPC, Commodore 64 and ZX Spectrum; it is the first licensed World Cup video game and is based on the 1986 FIFA World Cup in Mexico. It was initially meant to be made up of new code and assets, but development problems made U.S. Gold decide to recycle Artic Computing's 1984 title World Cup Football, with the added FIFA license and extras included in the box.

Upon release, World Cup Carnival received unanimously negative reviews from critics, players and retailers alike for its poor graphics, gameplay, sound and blatant recycling of World Cup Football; several magazines included angry letters from people who had bought the game, many of which were returned to stores.

== Gameplay ==
Ten teams (Uruguay, Italy, Germany, Brazil, England, Argentina, France, Spain, Mexico and Scotland) are available in the Commodore 64 and Amstrad CPC versions of the game while all 24 teams that played in the 1986 World Cup are available in the ZX Spectrum version. For all three platforms, the World Cup mode is played from the quarter finals onwards. Matches last for 3 minutes, and there is no ability to change formation settings etc.

In addition to the tournament mode, there is a practice mode available to be loaded separately. The practice mode on the Amstrad CPC, Commodore 64 and ZX Spectrum versions contains activities for practicing ball control, taking penalties and saving penalties, while the Commodore 16 version does not contain the saving penalties activity.

== Development and release ==
Artic Computing was responsible for making changes to World Cup Football to meet the publisher's needs, with Adam Waring and Tony Warriner claiming to have worked on the new title screen and the "practice mode" subgames. In an interview with Edge in 1996, Charles Cecil stated that the game's publisher U.S. Gold did not send any review copies to magazines until the game was already actively on sale. In a 1998 interview with the same publication, he added that the magazines' delayed access to the game caused a "furore" and that the game had already sold widely by the time reviews were able to be published.

== Reception ==
Reception

Review scores
Publication	Score
Amstrad Action	0%
Crash	28%
Sinclair User	1/5
Your Sinclair	3/10
Zzap!64	11%

World Cup Carnival achieved commercial success upon release, spending its first two weeks on the market in the number one position in computer game sales charts followed by two consecutive weeks in the top three titles.

=== Critical response ===
At the time of its release Zzap!64 awarded the C64 version of the game an overall score of just 11%, offering praise solely for the packaging and in-box posters. Amstrad Action gave the Amstrad CPC version a 0%, explaining their score as one that applied to those who already owned Artic Computing's World Cup Football.

Crash scored the ZX Spectrum version at 26%, with the reviewer stating "This is the worst football simulation I have ever seen". Writing for Sinclair User, Clare Edgeley described the ZX Spectrum release as "awful", calling particular attention to the frequent color clashing in the graphics and the inapplicability of the three practice modes towards the main game. John Minson (under the pseudonym Rachael Smith) gave the ZX Spectrum version a 3/10 in his review for Your Sinclair, describing it as "the same mediocre game it always was" and criticizing the color palette used for the players onscreen. Micro Hobby declined to give the ZX Spectrum release a score in its review due to its status as a clone and expressed a lack of satisfaction with the new practice modes.

Several publications highlighted the game in their worst-of-the-year awards for 1986. Readers of Crash magazine voted the title as the "Least Pleasing Game" of the year while the game placed 3rd in the same award category in Amtix! and Zzap!64. The title was awarded "Computer Game You Most Regretted Buying in 1986" by readers of Popular Computing Weekly. In his "Hot Shots" column for Commodore User, Mike Pattenden gave U.S. Gold the "Arthur Daley Dodgy Software but a Good Earner Award" for its role in publishing the game.

=== Prism Leisure lawsuit ===
Shortly after the game's release, developer Artic Computing was sued by Prism Leisure Corporation for copyright infringement as they had sold the copyright of World Cup Football in 1985 to keep the company afloat; Prism quickly won the lawsuit with Artic required to pay Prism for all the sales of World Cup Carnival, bankrupting the company in the process.

== Follow up games ==
Despite the overwhelmingly poor reception, U.S. Gold attempted to get the 1990 FIFA World Cup license in Italy; they failed, however, with Virgin Mastertronic gaining the license and developing World Cup Soccer: Italia '90. U.S. Gold soon released their game as Italy 1990.

== See also ==
- FIFA World Cup video games
