= Italy '90 Soccer =

1988 football video game

- Developer(s): Dardari Bros
- Publisher(s): Simulmondo
- Platform(s): Amiga, Commodore 64, PC Booter
- Release: 1988
- Genre(s): Sports

Italy '90 Soccer is a football video game developed by Dardari Bros and distributed by Simulmondo in 1988

It was the first of many unofficial games that would be released for the 1990 World Cup.

== Versions ==
The game was released for Amiga and Commodore 64 in Italy.

== See also ==
- World Cup Soccer: Italia '90 - the official game
- World Cup Italia '90 (Tiertex)
- Italia 1990 Codemasters
