= Artic Computing =

English computer game company, 1980–1986

- Industry: Video games
- Headquarters: Brandesburton, England
- Products: Computer games

Artic Computing was a software development company based in Brandesburton, England from 1980 to 1986. The company's first games were for the Sinclair ZX81 home computer, but they expanded and were also responsible for various ZX Spectrum, Commodore 64, BBC Micro, Acorn Electron and Amstrad CPC computer games. The company was set up by Richard Turner and Chris Thornton. Charles Cecil, who later founded Revolution Software, joined the company shortly after it was founded, writing Adventures B through D. Developer Jon Ritman produced a number of ZX81 and Spectrum games for Artic before moving to Ocean Software.

Usually packaging and distributing games themselves, some titles were picked up by Sinclair who repackaged them under the Sinclair brand, and Amstrad who repackaged them under their Amsoft brand.

Adventures A through D were written for the ZX81 but were quickly ported to the ZX Spectrum platform on its release (as well as other systems). By comparison with later Spectrum adventure games such as The Hobbit, they are basic and short. However they are considered by many to be the start of the adventure game genre on the Spectrum in particular and thus were an important step in the growth of adventure games.

== Games ==
- Sword of Peace (1980): ZX80, ZX81
- Adventure A: Planet of Death (1981): ZX81, ZX Spectrum, C64, Amstrad CPC
- Adventure B: Inca Curse (1981): ZX81, ZX Spectrum, C64, Amstrad CPC
- Zombies (1981): ZX81
- ZX Chess (1981): ZX81
- 1K ZX Chess (1982): ZX81
- Adventure C: Ship of Doom (1982): ZX81, ZX Spectrum, C64, Amstrad CPC
- Adventure D: Espionage Island (1982): ZX81, ZX Spectrum, C64, Amstrad CPC
- Invaders (1982): ZX Spectrum
- Namtir Raiders (1982): ZX81
- ZX-Galaxians (1982): ZX81
- 3D Combat Zone (1983): ZX Spectrum
- Adventure E: The Golden Apple (1983): ZX Spectrum
- Bear Bovver (1983): ZX Spectrum, C64
- Cosmic Debris (1983): ZX Spectrum
- Dimension Destructors (1983): ZX Spectrum
- Adventure F: The Eye of Bain (1984): ZX Spectrum
- Adventure G: Ground Zero (1984): ZX Spectrum
- Engineer Humpty (1984): ZX Spectrum, C64
- Humpty Dumpty in the Garden (1984): ZX Spectrum, C64
- Humpty Dumpty Meets the Fuzzy Wuzzies (1984): ZX Spectrum, C64
- Mothership (1984): ZX Spectrum, C64
- Mr Wong's Loopy Laundry (1984): ZX Spectrum, C64, Amstrad CPC, MSX
- Mutant Monty (1984): ZX Spectrum, C64, Amstrad CPC
- World Cup Football (1984): ZX Spectrum, C64, Amstrad CPC (reworked as World Cup Carnival by U.S. Gold in 1986)
- Adventure H: Robin Hood (1985): ZX Spectrum (released only as part of the Assemblage compilation)
- Aladdin's Cave (1985): ZX Spectrum, Amstrad CPC
- International Rugby (1985): ZX Spectrum, Amstrad CPC
- Assemblage (1986): ZX Spectrum (compilation, includes four games)
  - Harry Hare's Lair
  - Mutant Monty and the Temple of Doom
  - Curse of the Seven Faces
  - Robin Hood
- Obsidian (1986): Amstrad CPC
- Paws (1985): ZX Spectrum, Amstrad CPC
- Web War (1985): Acorn Electron, BBC Micro; similar to Tempest
- Rugby Manager (1986): ZX Spectrum
- The Great Wall (1986): Acorn Electron, BBC Micro; similar to Hunchback
- Voodoo Rage (1986): Amstrad CPC
- Woks (1986): Acorn Electron, BBC Micro

=== Adventure Games Development ===
The parser in their adventures is of a basic 2-word design, such as "Use Axe". However the programs from adventures A-F were built using a custom built design. Adventure G (Ground Zero) and later were built using The Quill, an Adventure Game Creator produced by Gilsoft.

== Programming and utilities ==
- Artic Forth (1982) Forth programming language
- ZX Assembler (1982)
- Toolkit (1982)
