= BurgerTime =

1982 video game

- Arcade flyer
- Developers: Data East, SAS
- Publishers: WW: Data East; NA: Bally Midway
- Designer: Yuji Gondo
- Programmer: Ken Obara
- Series: BurgerTime
- Platform: Arcade: Intellivision, Atari 2600, TI-99/4A, Apple II, Aquarius, IBM PC, ColecoVision, Coleco Adam, Famicom/NES, MSX, Famicom Disk System
- Release: August 25, 1982: Arcade; JP: August 25, 1982; NA: November 1982; EU: December 1982 Intellivision; June 1983 2600; August 1983 TI-99/4A; November 1983 Apple II, Aquarius, IBM PC; 1983 ColecoVision; April 1984 Adam; 1984 Famicom/NES; JP: November 27, 1985; NA: May 1987 MSX; JP: 1986 Famicom Disk System; JP: September 23, 1988
- Genre: Platform
- Modes: Single-player, multiplayer
- Arcade system: DECO Cassette System

BurgerTime (Note: Japanese: バーガータイム, Hepburn: Bāgātaimu) (or Hamburger (Note: Japanese: ハンバーガー, Hepburn: Hanbāgā) in Japan) is an arcade video game by Data East released in 1982. According to a former Data East programmer, the game was designed in-house but the development itself was outsourced to another company.

The player controls chef Peter Pepper, who walks across oversized ingredients in a maze of platforms and ladders, causing them to fall and stack on buns below, eventually creating complete burgers. Peter is pursued by anthropomorphic hot dogs, fried eggs, and pickles. A limited supply of pepper can be thrown at aggressors immediately in front of Peter, briefly stunning them.

Originally released domestically for the DECO Cassette System as Hamburger, the title was changed to BurgerTime outside of Japan. In the United States, Data East USA licensed BurgerTime for distribution by Bally Midway in North America. Data East also released the game in the United States through the DECO Cassette System. In addition to all western releases, BurgerTime is the name used for the Japanese ports and sequels.

The first home port of BurgerTime was released for the Intellivision console in 1983, followed by versions for other systems. There have been multiple sequels for both the arcade and home. After Data East went bankrupt in 2003, G-Mode bought much of the company's intellectual properties, including BurgerTime, BurgerTime Deluxe, Super BurgerTime, and Peter Pepper's Ice Cream Factory.

== Gameplay ==
The first level of the arcade version, with Peter Pepper at center, climbing a ladder

The object of the game is to build a number of hamburgers while avoiding enemy foods. The player controls the protagonist, chef Peter Pepper, with a four-position joystick and a "pepper" button.

Each level is a maze of platforms and ladders in which giant burger ingredients (bun, meat patty, tomato, lettuce and cheese) are arranged. When Peter walks the full length of an ingredient, it falls to the level below, knocking down any ingredient that happens to be there. A burger is completed when all of its vertically aligned ingredients have been dropped out of the maze and onto a waiting plate. The player must complete all burgers to finish the board.

Three types of enemy food items wander the maze: Mr. Hot Dog, Mr. Pickle, and Mr. Egg. The player can score extra points by either crushing them under a falling ingredient or dropping an ingredient while they are on it. In the latter case, the ingredient falls two extra levels for every enemy caught on it. Crushed or dropped enemies return to the maze after a short time, with crushed enemies appearing on the edges and dropped enemies respawning at their landing point and climbing back up into the maze if necessary. Dropping enemies is much riskier, but it also awards more points and allows the levels to be finished faster.

At the start of the game, the player is given five pepper shots to use against enemies. Pressing the button causes Peter to shake a cloud of pepper in the direction he is facing; any enemy touching the cloud is briefly stunned, and Peter can safely move through them. Food items (ice cream, coffee, fries) appear after a set number of ingredients have been dropped, awarding bonus points and an extra pepper shot when picked up.

There are six boards of increasing difficulty, with more burgers/ingredients, more enemies, and/or layouts that make it easier for Peter to become cornered. After the player completes the sixth board, the cycle repeats. One life is lost whenever Peter touches a non-stunned enemy, and the game ends once all lives are lost. The number of points required to gain extra lives varies between ports.

== Ports ==
Mattel Electronics obtained the rights to BurgerTime from Data East and released the Intellivision version in 1983. That year, they also released versions for the Atari 2600, Apple II, Aquarius, and, as a self-booting disk, the IBM PC. A version from Data East for the TI-99/4A was published in 1984. A ColecoVision port was published by Coleco in May 1984. Ports were released for the Famicom in 1985, MSX in 1986, Nintendo Entertainment System in 1987 and Famicom Disk System in 1988.

== Reception ==
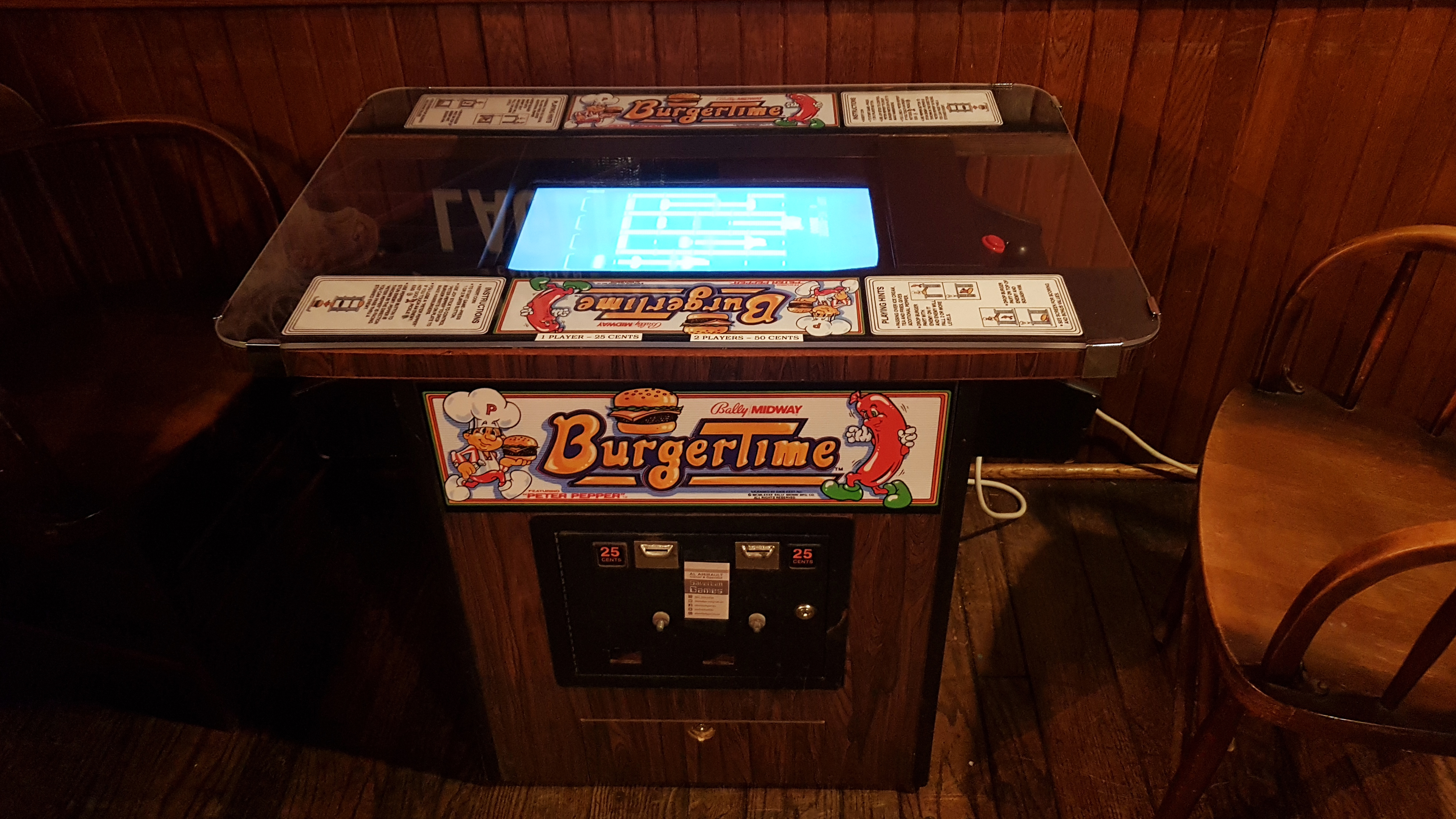
BurgerTime in a Dartmouth, Nova Scotia pub

In Japan, Game Machine listed Hamburger as the 11th highest-grossing arcade video game of 1982. The magazine later listed it as the 23rd most successful table arcade unit of June 1983.

Following its North American debut at the Amusement & Music Operators Association (AMOA) show in November 1982, it was reviewed by Video Games magazine, which listed it as the show's fourth best game, while saying it was the "stupidest, silliest game ever, and that's why you couldn't get people off the Burger Time games with a crowbar!" The review praised the "music, challenging mazes, and comical" characters.

Computer and Video Games gave it a positive review, comparing the level structure to Donkey Kong (1981), stating that BurgerTime has "a charm all its own" and praising the controls. The Deseret News called BurgerTime "one of the real surprises of 1983 for the Intellivision" and gave the ColecoVision version three-and-a-half stars out of four. Computer Games magazine gave the ColecoVision and Coleco Adam versions a positive review, stating that "the terrific flavor" of the arcade game remains but "the playfield has been greatly reduced".

BurgerTime received a Certificate of Merit in the category of "1984 Videogame of the Year (Less than 16K ROM)" at the 5th annual Arkie Awards.

== Legacy ==
=== Sequels ===
Release timeline
1982	BurgerTime
1983
1984	Peter Pepper's Ice Cream Factory
1985
1986
1987	Diner
1988
1989
1990	Super BurgerTime
1991	BurgerTime Deluxe
1992
1993
1994
1995
1996
1997
1998
1999
2000	The Flintstones: BurgerTime in Bedrock
2001
2002
2003
2004
2005
2006
2007	BurgerTime Delight
2008
2009	BurgerTime Deluxe (iOS)
2010
2011	BurgerTime World Tour
2012
2013
2014
2015
2016
2017
2018
2019	BurgerTime Party!
2020
2021
2022
2023
2024	Chili’s Big Smasher BurgerTime

Super BurgerTime flyer

An arcade spin-off, Peter Pepper's Ice Cream Factory (1984), and an arcade sequel, Super BurgerTime (スーパーバーガータイム) (1990), were not widely released. Super BurgerTime stars Peter Pepper Jr. and allows two players to play at once. It is fairly true to the original, but with many added features and a different style of graphics.

A console-only sequel, Diner, was created after the 1984 purchase of Intellivision from Mattel by INTV Corp. It was programmed by Ray Kaestner, the programmer of the Intellivision version of BurgerTime. In Diner, Peter Pepper must kick balls of food so that they roll off platforms and down ramps to land on a large plate at the bottom of the screen, while avoiding or crushing enemy food items that are trying to stop him.

BurgerTime Deluxe was released for the Game Boy in 1991 with similar gameplay to the original arcade game.

A crossover with The Flintstones titled The Flintstones: BurgerTime in Bedrock was released on Game Boy Color in 2000.

Namco released BurgerTime Delight for mobile devices in 2007. It includes "new graphics, characters and power-ups". There are six "arcade levels" and eight enhanced mode levels with perils of falling ice and rising fire from the grill. Besides the pepper of the classic game, there is now a salt shaker, that when collected stuns all enemies on the screen.

A 3D update, BurgerTime World Tour, was released in 2011 for Xbox Live Arcade and PlayStation Network, and in 2012 for WiiWare. It was delisted from Xbox Live Arcade in April 2014. G-Mode and XSEED Games released a re-imagining of the game on October 8, 2019, titled BurgerTime Party!, for the Nintendo Switch, with new modes and redesigns.

In 2024, the Chili's restaurant chain obtained the license for BurgerTime to create a browser-based game called Chili's Big Smasher BurgerTime. In this version of the game, players control the franchise mascot Joe ChiliHead in a quest to create Big Smasher Burgers across six levels of gameplay. Players who participated also had the chance to win prizes such as free burgers for life.

=== Re-releases ===
The arcade version of BurgerTime has been included in various collections, including Arcade's Greatest Hits: The Midway Collection 2 for the PlayStation and Data East Arcade Classics for the Wii. In late 2019/early 2020, it was released with fellow Data East titles Karate Champ, Caveman Ninja and Bad Dudes in an arcade cabinet for home use by manufacturer Arcade1Up. Although the cabinet comes with four games in one, its artwork features only the graphics of Burgertime.

The NES and FDS versions were available on the Wii's Virtual Console. The NES version is also included in the 2017 compilation Data East All-Star Collection for the Nintendo Entertainment System. Its Game Boy counterpart BurgerTime Deluxe was released for the Nintendo 3DS' Virtual Console in 2011. BurgerTime Deluxe was re-released in 2023 for the Nintendo Switch through the Nintendo Classics service.

Hamster Corporation released the game as part of their Arcade Archives series for the Nintendo Switch and PlayStation 4 in July 2020.

=== Clones ===
Clones for home systems include Mr. Wimpy, Bear Bovver, Burger Chase, BurgerSpace, Chip Factory, Burger Boy!, Basic Burger, Barmy Burgers, Burger Builder, and Lunchtime. BurgerSpace is a 2007 open source clone.

=== In popular culture ===
Elements of BurgerTime were incorporated into the episode "Gameboy" of the DIC Entertainment animated series Captain N: The Game Master. Peter Pepper appears in the movies Wreck-It Ralph and Pixels. Mr. Egg appears as one of the Nintendians in the Futurama episode "Anthology of Interest II". A BurgerTime parody called "Burgerboss" appears in an episode of Bob's Burgers with the same name. There is a copy of BurgerTime in the front display window of the fictional store Blast from the Past in the movie Back to the Future Part II.

== Scores ==
On September 5, 2005, Bryan L. Wagner of Turbotville, Pennsylvania achieved a record score of 8,601,300 and improved to exactly 9,000,000 on June 2, 2006. According to Twin Galaxies, he improved it further to 11,512,500 points on September 19, 2008, at the Challenge Arcade in Wyomissing, Pennsylvania. The MAME world record was verified by Twin Galaxies on December 2, 2016, as 7,837,750 by Roger Edwin Blair III of Mountain City, Tennessee.

== See also ==
- Pressure Cooker
