= Italia 1990 (Codemasters) =

1990 video game

- Developer: Codemasters
- Publisher: Codemasters
- Designer: The Oliver Twins
- Composer: Allister Brimble (Amiga)
- Platforms: Atari ST; Amiga
- Genre: Sports video game

Italia 1990 is a budget football video game developed by Codemasters in 1990.

== The game ==
It was released for Amiga and Atari ST at the £4.99 price point which was a quarter of the price of similar games. The low price however was the best part of the game according to reviewer Andy Smith of Amiga Format who gave a score of 27%: "The game looks all right but plays awfully badly. The sluggishness you can live with and you can even put up with the weird scroll, which sometimes lags far behind the action - but what really screws the game up is the inability to alter the direction of the player once you've pressed the fire button for a shot".

== See also ==
- World Cup Soccer: Italia '90 (the officially licensed game)
- Italy '90 Soccer
- Italy 1990 (video game)
