= Bird's-eye view =

Elevated view of an object or location from above

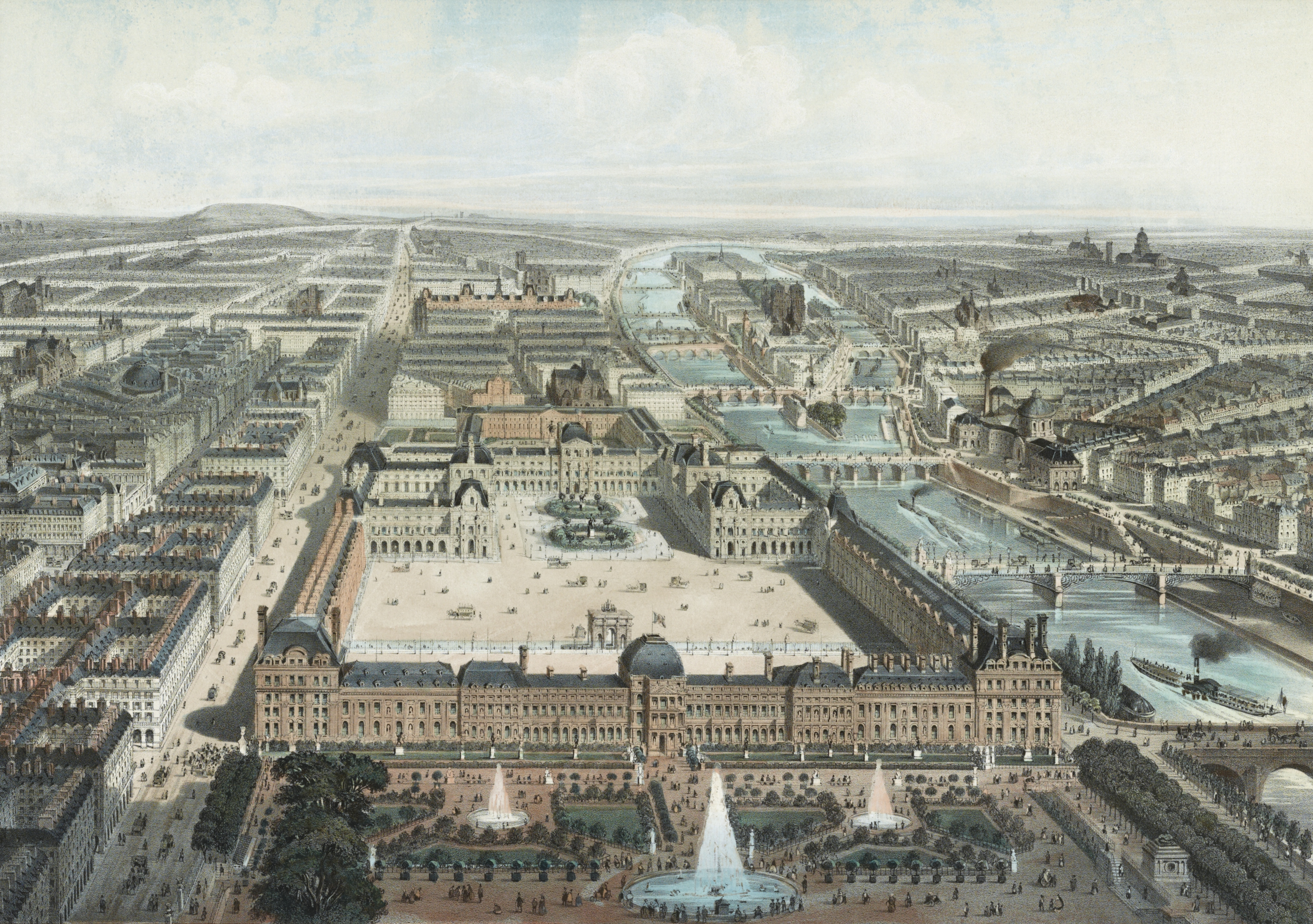
Bird's-eye view engraving of Paris in 1850

A literal bird's eye view, shot by a bird picking up a GoPro camera

A bird's-eye view is an elevated view of an object or location from a very steep viewing angle, creating a perspective as if the observer were a bird in flight looking downward. Bird's-eye views can be an aerial photograph, but also a drawing, and are often used in the making of blueprints, floor plans and maps.

Before crewed flight was common, the term bird's eye was used to distinguish views drawn from direct observation at high vantage locations (e.g. a mountain or tower), from those constructed from an imagined bird's perspective. Bird's eye views as a genre have existed since classical times. They were significantly popular in the mid-to-late 19th century in the United States and Europe as photographic prints.

== Terminology ==
The terms aerial view and aerial viewpoint are also sometimes used synonymously with bird's-eye view. The term aerial view can refer to any view from a great height, even at a wide angle, as for example when looking sideways from an airplane window or from a mountain top. Overhead view is fairly synonymous with bird's-eye view but tends to imply a vantage point of a lesser height than the latter term. For example, in computer and video games, an "overhead view" of a character or situation often places the vantage point only a few feet (a meter or two) above human height. See top–down perspective.

Recent technological and networking developments have made satellite images more accessible. Microsoft Bing Maps offers direct overhead satellite photos of the entire planet but also offers a feature named Bird's eye view in some locations. The Bird's Eye photos are angled at 40 degrees rather than being straight down. Satellite imaging programs and photos have been described as offering a viewer the opportunity to "fly over" and observe the world from this specific angle.

In filmmaking and video production, a bird's-eye shot refers to a shot looking directly down on the subject. The perspective is very foreshortened, making the subject appear short and squat. This shot can be used to give an overall establishing shot of a scene, or to emphasise the smallness or insignificance of the subjects. It is shot by lifting the camera up by hands or by hanging it off something strong enough to support it. When a scene needs a large area shot, it is a crane shot.

Bird's-eye views are common in the broadcasting of sports events, especially in the 21st century, with the increased usage of the Skycam and other devices like it, such as the CableCam and Spidercam.

== Gallery ==
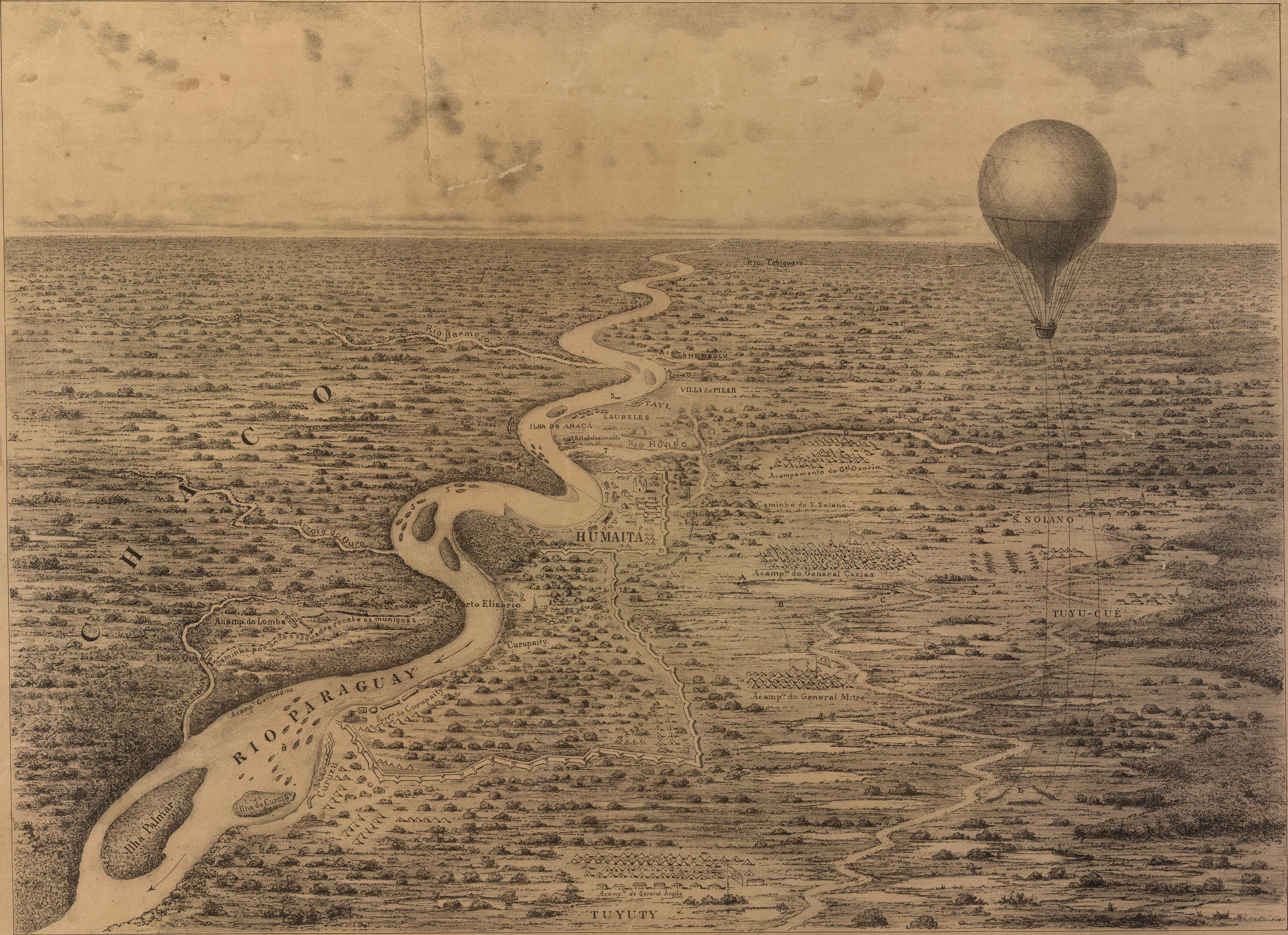
Bird's-eye view of operations during the Paraguayan War from James Allen's observation balloon, 1868

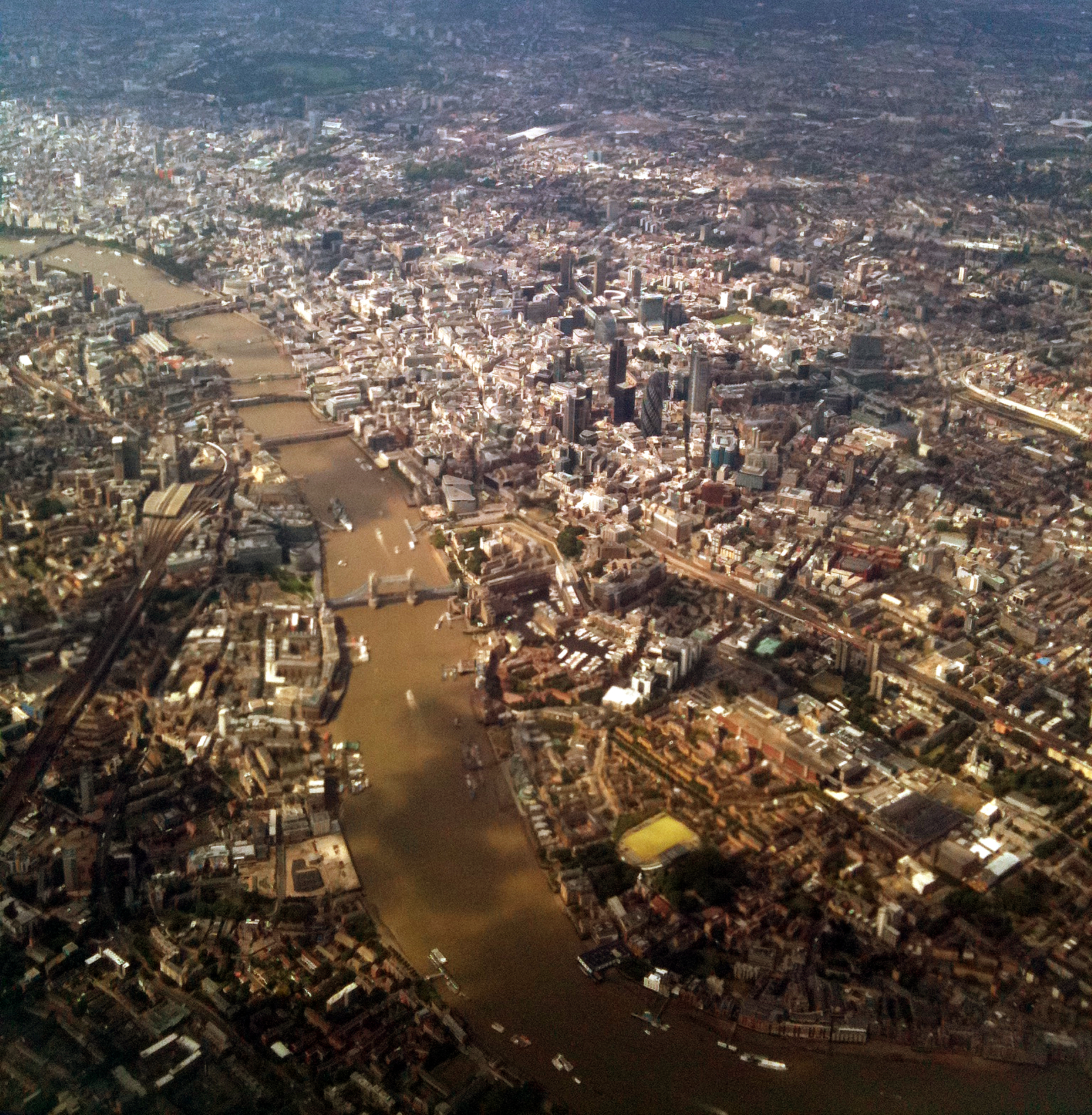
Aerial view of the City of London, 2011

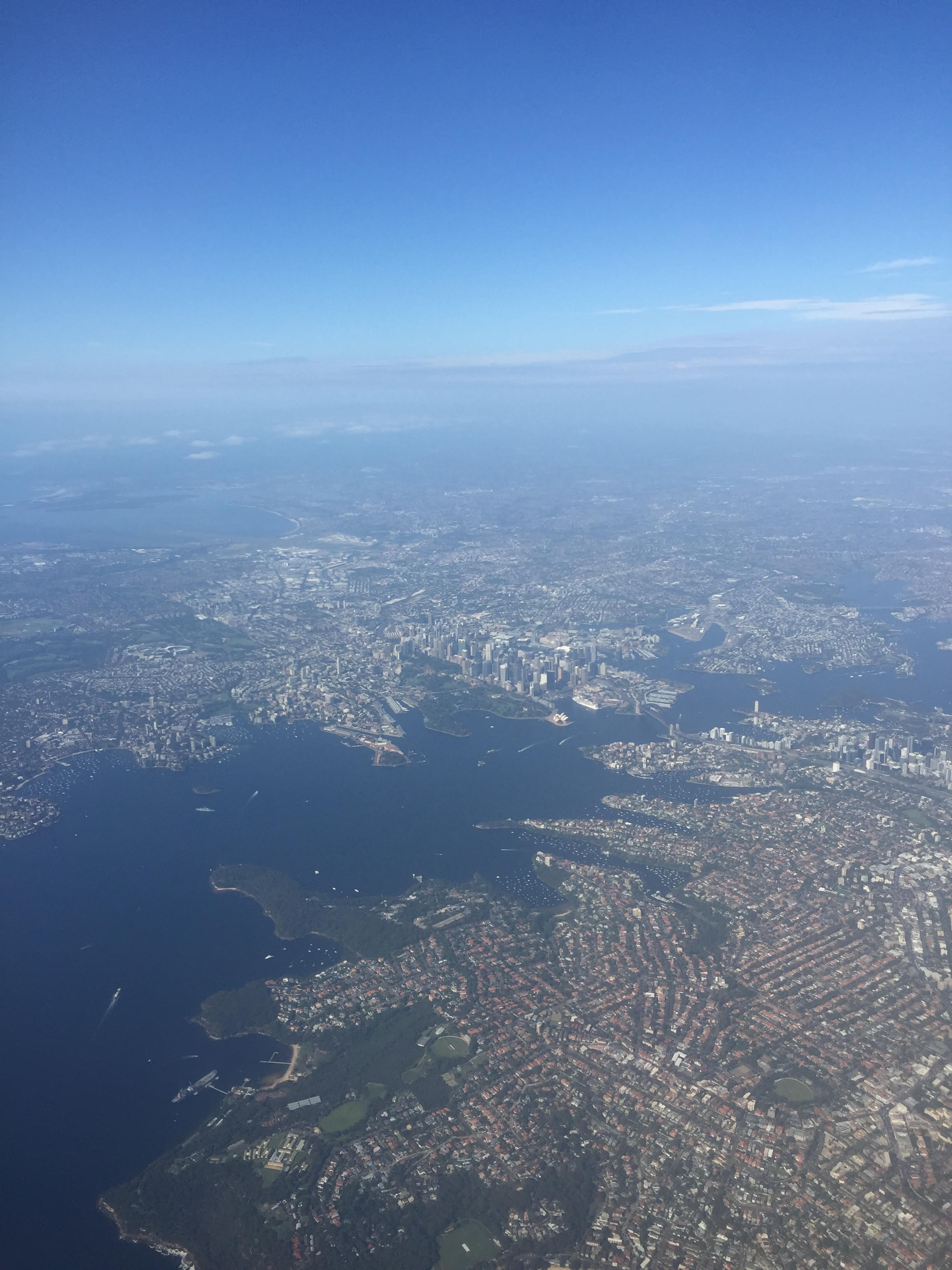
View of Sydney from an airliner

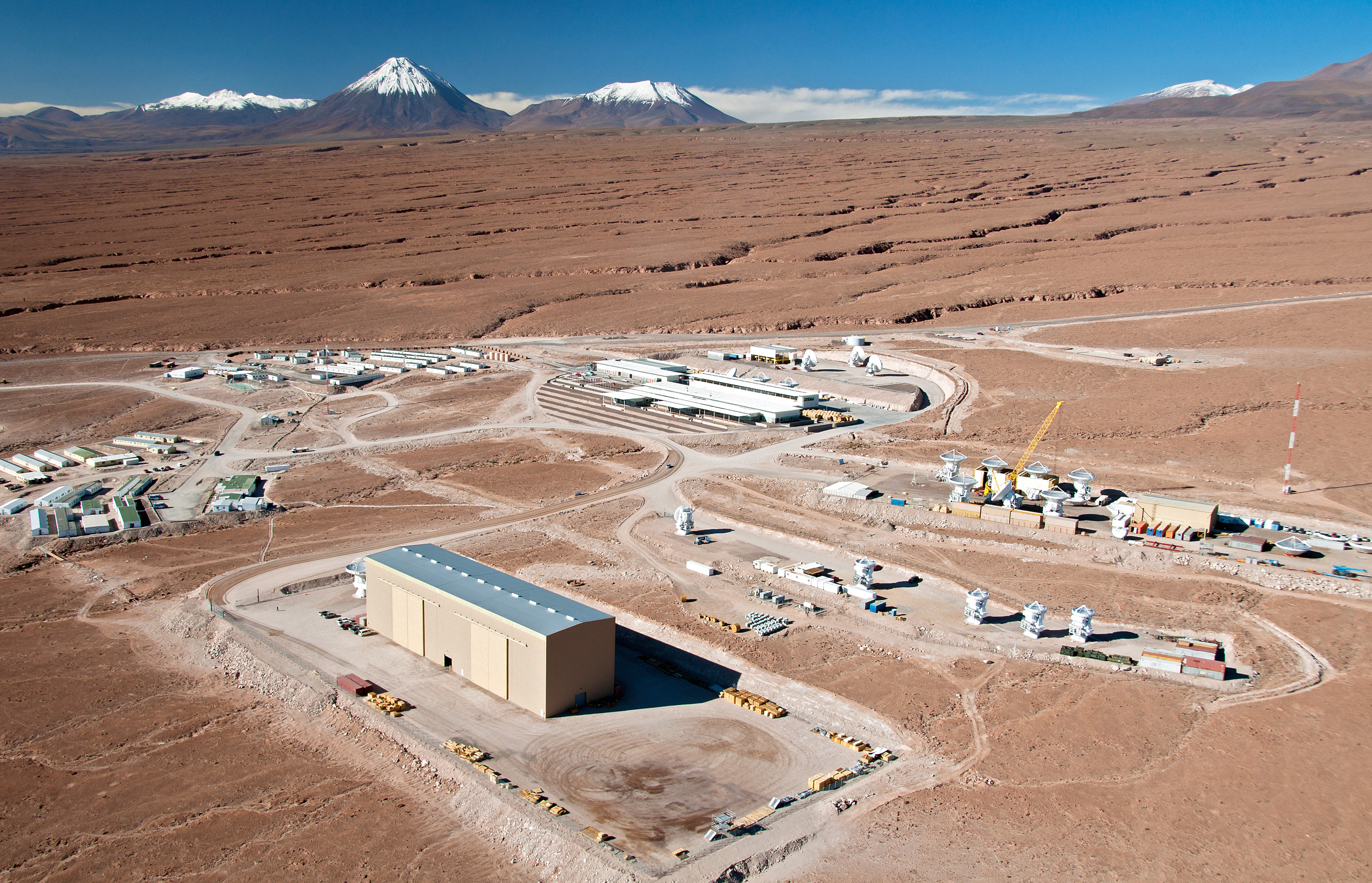
Flying above the ESO's Atacama Large Millimeter Array site

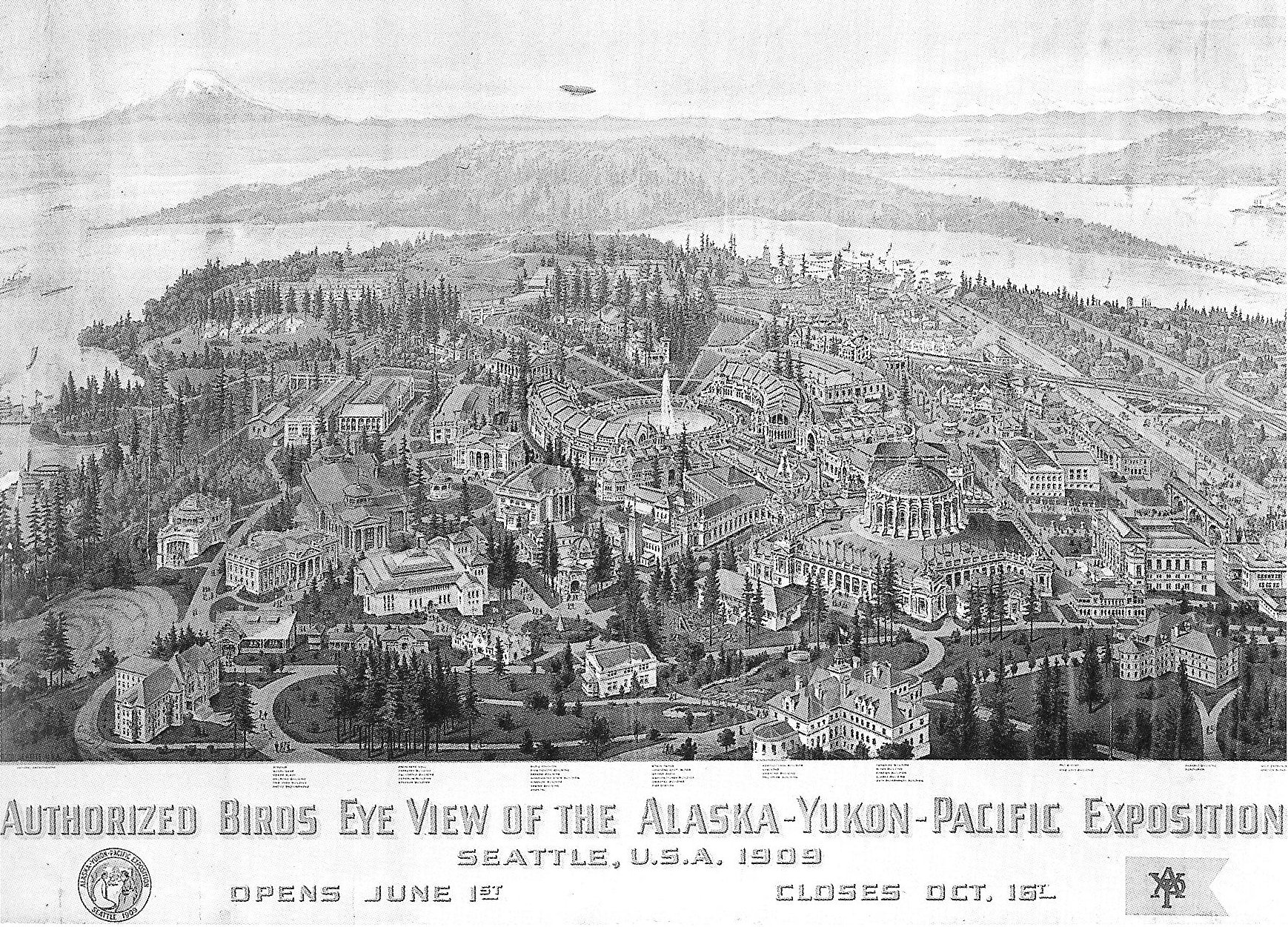
Bird's eye view wood-engraving of the Alaska-Yukon-Pacific Exposition, 1909

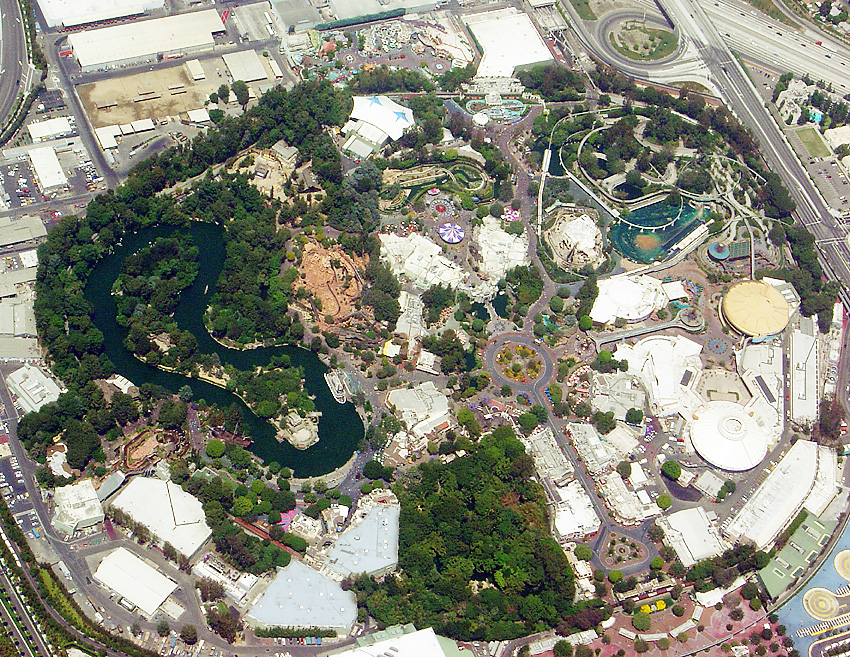
Aerial view of Disneyland in 2004

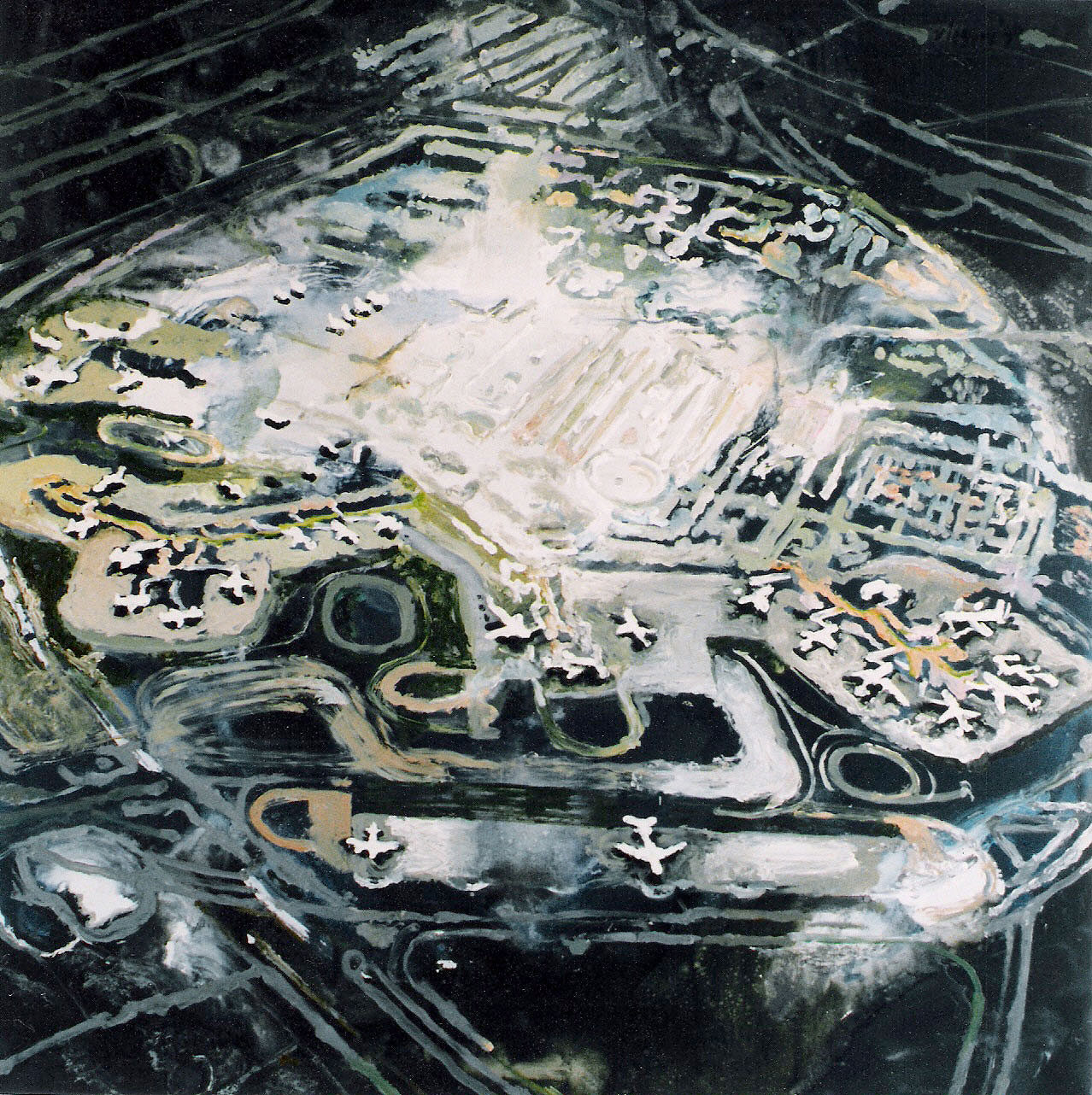
Painting of Schiphol Airport by the Dutch artist Janneke Viegers

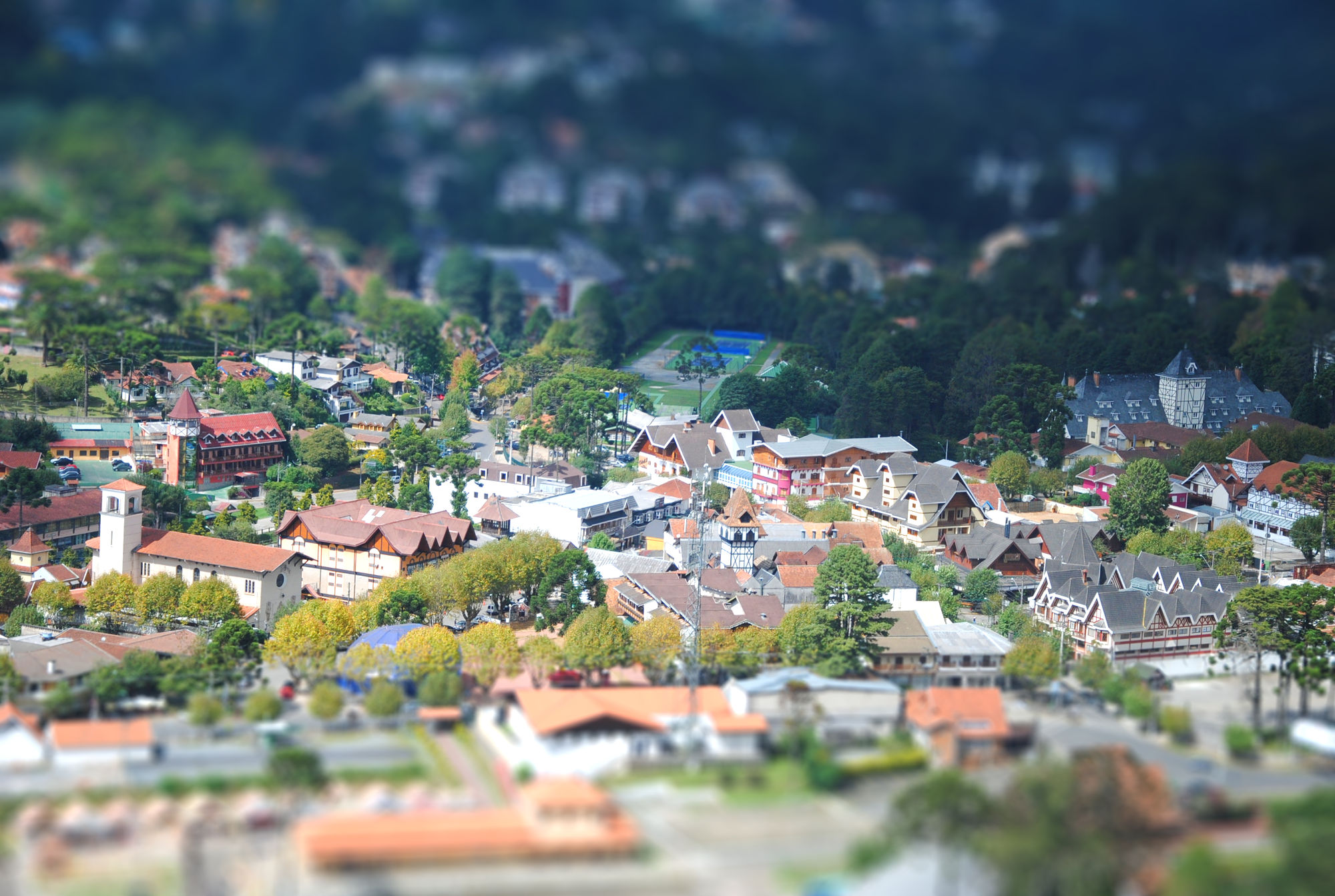
Bird's-eye view of Campos do Jordão, Brazil with tilt shift lens effect

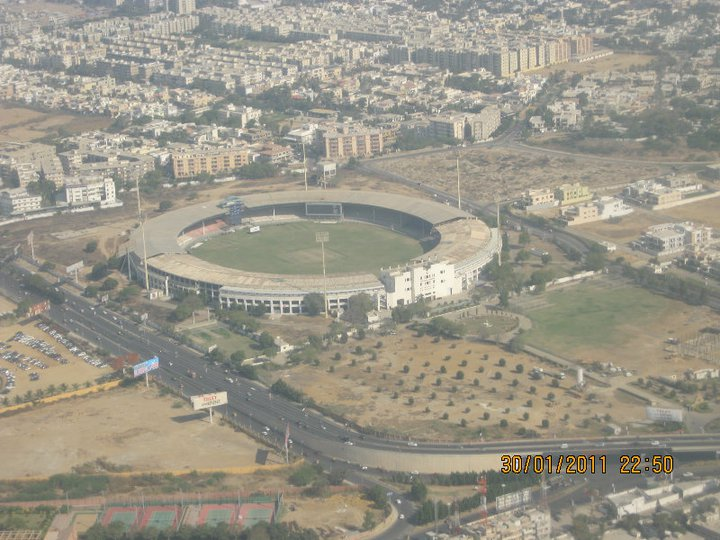
A 2011 bird's-eye view of National Stadium in Karachi, Pakistan

== Bird's-flight view ==
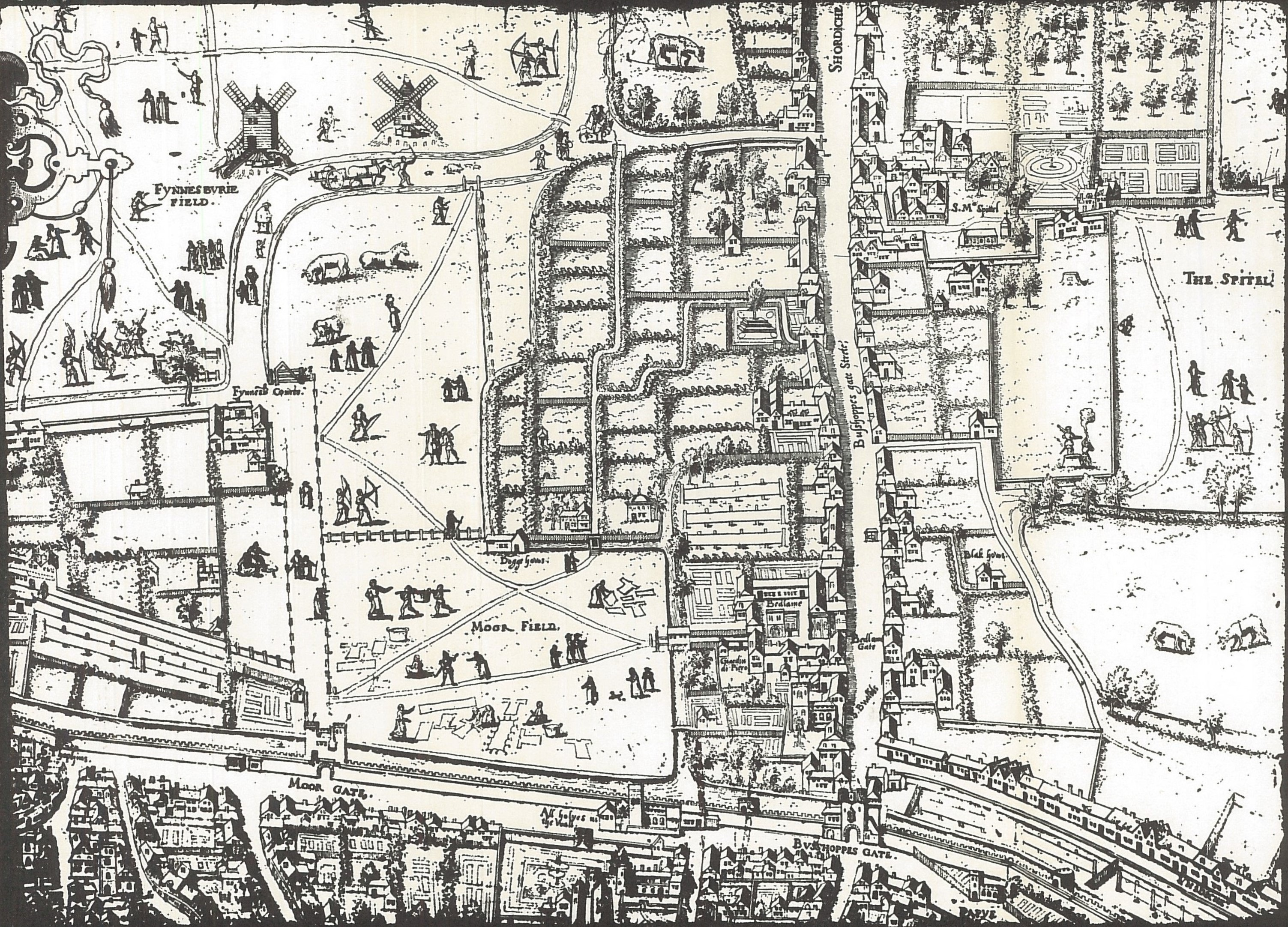
Part of the "Copperplate" map of London, surveyed between 1553 and 1559, depicting a bird's-flight view of the Moorfields area

A distinction is sometimes drawn between a bird's-eye view and a bird's-flight view, or "view-plan in isometrical projection". Whereas a bird's-eye view shows a scene from a single viewpoint (real or imagined) in true perspective, including, for example, the foreshortening of more distant features, a bird's-flight view combines a vertical plan of ground-level features with perspective views of buildings and other standing features, all presented at roughly the same scale. The landscape appears "as it would unfold itself to any one passing over it, as in a balloon, at a height sufficient to abolish sharpness of perspective, and yet low enough to allow of distinct view of the scene beneath". The technique was popular among local surveyors and cartographers of the sixteenth and early seventeenth centuries.

== See also ==
- Aerial landscape art
- Aerial perspective (disambiguation)
- Archimedean point
- Camera angle
- Pictorial map
- Pictometry
- Plans (drawings)
- Worm's-eye view
