= List of Amstrad CPC games =

This is a list of video games for the Amstrad CPC home computer series. There are currently 1809 games on this list.

Title	Release date	Developer	Publisher
007: Licence to Kill	1989	Quixel	Domark
10th Frame	1986	Access Software	U.S. Gold
180	1986		Mastertronic
1942	1986	Capcom	U.S. Gold, Elite Systems
1943: The Battle of Midway	1988	Capcom	U.S. Gold
1st Division Manager	1992		Codemasters
20000 Lieues Sous les Mers	1988		Coktel Vision
2088 (video game)	1988		Zeppelin Games
2112 AD (video game)	1986		Design Design
3D Construction Kit	1991	Incentive Software	Domark, Incentive Software
3D Boxing	1985		Amsoft
3D Fight	1985		Loriciels
3D Grand Prix	1985		Amsoft
3D Invaders	1984		Amsoft
3-D Monster Chase	1985		Romik
3D Pool	1989		Firebird Software
3D Quasars	1985		Solar Software
3D Snooker	1990		Players Software
3D Starfighter	1987		Codemasters
3D Starstrike	1985		Realtime Games
3D Stunt Rider	1985		Amsoft
4 Soccer Simulators	1989	Codemasters	Codemasters Gold
4x4 Off-Road Racing	1988	Ogdan Micro Design	Epyx (NA), U.S. Gold (EU)
500 cc Grand Prix	1987 (EU)	Microïds	Microïds
The 5th Axis	1985		Activision/Loriciels
720°	1988	Atari Games	U.S. Gold
750cc Grand Prix	1989	WASP	Codemasters
The A-Team (video game)	1988		Zafiro Software
A320	1988		Loriciels
Aaargh!	1989	Binary Design, Sculptured Software	Arcadia Systems; Melbourne House
Abracadabra	1989	Odisea Software	Proein Soft Line
Abu Simbel Profanation	1986		Dinamic
Academy	1987	CRL	CRL
ACE	1985	Cascade Games	Cascade Games (UK); UXB (NA)
ACE 2	1987	Cascade Games	Cascade Games (UK); Artronic Limited (NA)
Ace of Aces	1987	Paragon Programming	U.S. Gold (EU); Accolade (NA)
Acheton			Topologika
Acrojet	1985	MicroProse	U.S. Gold
Action Fighter	1989	Sega R&D2	Firebird Software
Action Force	1988	The Gang of Five	Virgin Games
Activator	1986		Cascade Games
Addams Family, The	1992	Ocean Software	Ocean Software
Adidas Championship Football	1990	Ocean Software	Ocean Software
Adidas Championship Tie Break	1990	Starbyte Software	Starbyte Software (GER); Ocean Software (EU); DigiTek Software (NA)
Advanced Destroyer Simulator	1990	Futura Games	Futura Games
Advanced Dungeons & Dragons: Heroes of the Lance	1988	U.S. Gold	U.S. Gold
Advanced Lawnmower Simulator	1988	Duncan Macdonald	Your Sinclair
Advanced Pinball Simulator	1988		Codemasters
Adventure A: Planet of Death	1985	Artic Computing	Artic Computing
Adventure Quest	1983	Level 9	Telecomsoft
African Trail Simulator	1990		Positive Software / Dinamic
After Shock	1986		Interceptor Micros
After the War	1989	Dinamic	Dinamic
After Burner	1988		Activision
Aftermath	1988		Alternative Software
Afteroids	1988		Zigurat Software
Agent Orange	1987		A&F Software
Agent X II: The Mad Prof's Back	1987	Steven Tatlock, John Tatlock, Tim Follin	Mastertronic
Ahhh!!!	1984		CRL Group
Airborne Ranger	1987	MicroProse	MicroProse
Airwolf	1985		Amsoft/Elite Systems
Airwolf II	1987		Hit Pak
Aladdin's Cave	1985		Artic Software
Alex Higgins' World Pool	1985	Gem Software	Amsoft
Alex Higgins' World Snooker	1985	Gem Software	Amsoft
Alien	1985	Concept Software	Amsoft/Argus Press Software
Alien 8	1985	Tim and Chris Stamper	Ultimate Play the Game
Alien Highway	1986	Mark Haigh-Hutchinson	Vortex Software
Alien Storm	1991	Tiertex	U.S. Gold
Alien Syndrome	1988	Sega R&D1	Tengen
Aliens (UK Version)	1986	Software Studios; Mr. Micro	Electric Dreams Software
Aliens (US version)	1987	Activision; Mr. Micro	Activision (US); Electric Dreams Software (UK)
Alphakhor	1989		Loriciels
Altered Beast	1989		Activision
Alternative World Games	1987	Novotrade Software	Gremlin Interactive
Amaurote	1987	Binary Design	Mastertronic
A.M.C.: Astro Marine Corps	1989	Creepsoft	Dinamic
Amelie Minuit	1985		ERE Informatique
American Tag-Team Wrestling	1992	Zeppelin Games	Zeppelin Games
American Turbo King	1989		Mastertronic
Amsoccer	1986		IJK Software
Amstrad Shuffle	1986		Alpha Omega Software
Anarchy	1988		Rack It
Ancient Art of War, The	1984	Evryware	Broderbund
Android One: The Reactor Run	1985	Mark Haigh-Hutchinson	Vortex Software
Android Two	1985	Costa Panayi	Vortex Software
Andy Capp: The Game	1987	Blitter Animations	Mirrorsoft
Angel Nieto Pole 500	1990		Opera Soft
Angleball	1987		Mastertronic
Annals of Rome	1986	Personal Software Services	Personal Software Services
APB	1989	Tengen	Domark
Apprentice, The	1986		Mastertronic
A Question of Sport	1988	Elite Systems	Elite Systems; Superior Software
Arachnophobia	1991	BlueSky Software	Disney Software
Arcade Flight Simulator	1989		Codemasters
Arcade Fruit Machine	1989		Zeppelin Games
Arcade Trivia	1989		Zeppelin Games
Archers, The	1986		Level 9/Mosaic Software
Archon: The Light and the Dark	1984	Free Fall Associates	Electronic Arts (NA); Ariolasoft (EU)
Archon II: Adept	1984	Free Fall Associates	Electronic Arts (NA); Ariolasoft (EU)
Arkanoid	1987		Imagine Software
Arkanoid: Revenge of Doh	1988		Imagine Software
Armageddon Man, The	1987	Martech	Martech
Army Moves	1986	Dinamic	Imagine Software
Arnhem	1985	Robert T. Smith	Cases Computer Simulations
Artura	1988		Gremlin Graphics
Ashkeron	1984		First Star
Ashkeron!	1985	Texgate Computers	Mirrorsoft
Aspar GP Master	1988		Dinamic
Asphalt	1987		Ubi Soft
Assault Course	1990		Players Software
Asterix and the Magic Carpet	1988		Coktel Vision
Asterix and the Magic Cauldron	1986	Beam Software	Melbourne House
Astonishing Adventures of Mr. Weems and the She Vampires, The	1987	RamJam Corporation	Piranha Games
Astro Attack	1984		Amsoft
Astroball	1988		Power House Software
ATF	1988	Ian Beynon, Neil Coxhead, Kevin J. Bezant	Digital Integration Ltd.
Athena	1987		Imagine
Atom Ant	1990		Hi-Tec Software
Atom Smasher	1984		Amsoft
Atomic Driver	1988		Loriciels
Atomik	1988		FIL Software
Atrog	1988		Zafiro Software
Attack of the Killer Tomatoes	1986	Fatman, Dobbin, Stuart Ruecroft	Global Software
ATV Simulator	1988		Codemasters
Auf Wiedersehen Monty	1987	Peter Harrap, Shaun Hollingworth	Gremlin Graphics
Autocras	1991		Zigurat Software
Avenger	1986	Gremlin Graphics	Gremlin Graphics
A View to a Kill	1985	Domark	Domark
La Aventura Espacial (video game)	1988		Aventuras AD
La Aventura Original (video game)	1989		Aventuras AD
L'Apprenti Sorcier	1985		Amsoft
Avon			Topologika
Awesome Earl in SkateRock	1986		Bubble Bus Software
B.A.T.	1990		Ubisoft
Babaliba	1984		Dinamic
Back to the Future	1985		Electric Dreams
Back to the Future Part II	1990		Image Works
Back to the Future Part III	1991		Image Works
Baby Jo	1992		Loriciels
Bachou	1986		Central Solutions
Back to Reality	1986		Mastertronic
Back to the Golden Age	1991		Ubi Soft
Bactron	1986		Loriciels
Bad Dudes Vs. DragonNinja	1988		Imagine Software
Bad Max	1985		Transoft
Badlands	1990		Domark
Ball Bearing	1993		Radical Software
Ball Crazy	1987		Mastertronic
Ballblazer	1987		Activision/Lucasfilm
Ballbreaker	1987		CRL Group
Balloon Buster	1989		Blue Ribbon Software
Balloonacy	2008		Cronosoft
Ballyhoo	1985		Infocom
Banger Racer	1991		Cult Software
Bangers and Mash	1992		Alternative Software
Barbarian	1988		Psygnosis
Barbarian: The Ultimate Warrior	1987		Palace Software
Barbarian II: The Dungeon of Drax	1989		Palace Software
Bard's Tale, The	1985		Electronic Arts
Barrier Reef	1987		Power House Software
Barry McGuigan World Championship Boxing	1985		Activision
Basil the Great Mouse Detective	1987		Gremlin Graphics
Basket Master	1987		Dinamic/Imagine Software
Batman (1986 Ocean game)	1986		Ocean Software
Batman (1989 Ocean game)	1989		Ocean Software
Batman: The Caped Crusader	1988		Ocean Software
Batman: The Movie	1989		Ocean Software
Battle Beyond the Stars	1985		Solar Software
Battle Command	1990		Ocean Software
Battlefield Germany	1987		Personal Software Services
Battleships	1987		Elite Systems
Battle Valley	1988		Rack It
Battle of Britain	1986		Personal Software Services
Battle of the Planets	1986		Mikro-Gen
Batty	1987		Hit Pak
Beach Buggy Simulator	1988		Silverbird
Beach Head	1985		U.S. Gold
Beach Head II: The Dictator Strikes Back	1986		U.S. Gold
Beach Volley	1989		Ocean Software
Bedlam	1988		Go! Software
Bells, The	1986		Blaby Software
Bestial Warrior	1989		Dinamic
Best of the Best: Championship Karate	1992		Loriciels
Beverly Hills Cop	1990		Tynesoft
Beyond the Ice Palace	1988		Elite Systems
Biff	1992		Beyond Belief Software
Big Foot	1988		Codemasters
Big Trouble in Little China	1987		Electric Dreams
Billy 2	1987		Loriciels
Billy la Banlieue	1986		Loriciels
Billy the Kid	1990		Mastertronic
Bio Spheres	1988		Silverbird
Bionic Commando	1988		Go! Software
Bionic Ninja	1989		Zeppelin Games
Birdie	1987		ERE Informatique
Black Beard	1988		Topo Soft
Black Fountain	1987		Incentive Software
Black Magic	1987		U.S. Gold
Black Tiger	1989		U.S. Gold
Blade Runner	1986		CRL Group
Blade Warrior	1989		Codemasters
Blagger	1984		Amsoft/Alligata
Blasteroids	1989		Image Works
Blazing Thunder	1990		Hi-Tec Software
Blip	1989		Silverbird
Blockbusters	1988		TV Games
Blood Brothers	1988		Gremlin Graphics
Blood Valley	1988		Gremlin Graphics
Bloodwych	1990		Image Works
Blueberry	1987		Coktel Vision
Blues Brothers, The	1992		Titus Software
BMX Freestyle	1989		Codemasters
BMX Kidz	1988		Silverbird
BMX Ninja	1989		Alternative Software
BMX Simulator	1987		Codemasters
BMX Simulator 2	1989		Codemasters
Bob Winner	1986		Loriciels
Bob's Full House	1988		TV Games
Bobby Bearing	1986		The Edge Software
Bobo	1988		Infogrames
Boggit, The	1986		CRL Group
Boinggg!	1988		Atlantis Software
Bomb Fusion	1989		Mastertronic
Bomb Jack	1986		Elite Systems
Bomb Jack II	1987		Elite Systems
Bomb Scare	1986		Firebird Software
Bonanza Bros.	1992		U.S. Gold
Booly	1991		Loriciels
Booty	1986		Firebird Software
Bored of the Rings	1985		Delta 4
Bosconian '87	1987		Mastertronic
Boulder Dash	1985		Mirrorsoft/First Star
Boulder Dash III	1986		Action Software
Bounder	1986		Gremlin Graphics
Bounty Hunter	1989		Codemasters
Bounty Bob Strikes Back!	1985		Big Five Software
Boy Racer	1987		Alligata
Brainache	1987		Codemasters
Brainies, The	1991		Loriciels
Brainstorm	1987		Firebird Software
Bravestarr	1987		U.S. Gold
Braxx Bluff	1984		Micromega
BreakThru	1986		U.S. Gold
Brian Bloodaxe	1985		The Edge Software
Brian Jacks Superstar Challenge	1985		Martech
Uchi Mata	1986		Martech
Brick, The	1989		Diabolic
Bridge-It	1984		Amsoft
British Super League	1990		Cult Software
Bronx	1989		Animagic
Bronx Street Cop	1989		Mastertronic
Bruce Lee	1984		U.S. Gold
Bubble Bobble	1987		Firebird Software
Bubble Dizzy	1991		Codemasters
Bubble Ghost	1988		ERE Informatique
Bubbler	1987		Ultimate Play the Game
Buffalo Bill's Wild West Show	1989		Tynesoft
Bugaboo (The Flea)	1983		Quicksilva
Buggy Boy	1987		Elite Systems
Bugsy	1986		CRL
Builderland	1991		Loriciels
Bully's Sporting Darts	1993		Alternative Software
Bumpy	1989		Loriciels
Bumpy's Arcade Fantasy	1992		Loriciels
Bunny Bricks	1992		Silmarils Software
Burnin' Rubber	1990		Ocean Software
Buster Block	1986		Kuma Software
Butcher Hill	1989		Gremlin Graphics
By Fair Means or Foul	1988		Superior Software
Cabal	1989		Ocean Software
California Games	1987		U.S. Gold/Epyx
Camelot Warriors	1986		Dinamic
Capitán Sevilla	1988		Dinamic
Capitán Trueno	1989		Dinamic
Captain America in: The Doom Tube of Dr. Megalomann	1986		Mikro-Gen
Captain Blood	1988		ERE Informatique
Captain Dynamo	1993		Codemasters
Captain Kidd	1985		Bug-Byte
Captain Planet and the Planeteers	1991		Mindscape Software
Carlos Sainz	1990		Zigurat Software
Carrier Command	1988		Rainbird Software
Cassette 50	1983		Cascade Games
Castle Assault	1985		Blue Ribbon Software
Castle Blackstar	1986		SCR Adventures/CDS Micro Systems
Castle Master	1990		Domark/Incentive Software
Castle Master II: The Crypt	1991		Domark/Incentive Software
Cauldron	1985		Palace Software
Cauldron II: The Pumpkin Strikes Back	1986		Palace Software
Cavemania	1991		Atlantis Software
Caves of Doom, The	1985		Mastertronic
Centre Court	1985		Amsoft
Centurions	1987		Reaktör
Cerberus	1986		Players Software
Chain Reaction	1988		Durell
Championship Baseball	1987		Activision
Championship Basketball	1987		Activision
Championship Jetski Simulator	1989		Codemasters
Championship Sprint	1988		Electric Dreams
Charlie and the Chocolate Factory	1985		Hill MacGibbon
Chase H.Q.	1989		Ocean Software
Chessmaster 2000, The	1990		Ubi Soft
Chevy Chase	1991		Hi-Tec Software
Chicago 90	1989		Microids
Chicago's 30	1988		Topo Soft
Chichén Itzá	1985		Aventuras AD
Chickin Chase	1987		Firebird Software
Chimera	1985		Firebird Software
Chip's Challenge	1991		U.S. Gold
Cholo	1986		Firebird
Chopper Squad	1985		Interceptor Software
Choy-Lee-Fut Kung-Fu Warrior	1990		Positive
Chronos	1987		Mastertronic
Chubby Gristle	1988		Grandslam Entertainment
Chuck Yeager's Advanced Flight Trainer	1987		Electronic Arts
Chuckie Egg	1985		A&F Software
Chuckie Egg 2	1985		A&F Software
Cisco Heat	1991		Image Works
City Slicker	1986		Hewson Consultants
Classic Axiens	1987		Bubble Bus
Classic Invaders	1986		Bubble Bus
Classic Muncher	1987		Bubble Bus
Classiques Volume 1	1987		Titus Software
Classiques Volume 2	1987		Titus Software
Cobra	1987		Ocean Software
Cobra	1987		Loriciels
Cobra Force	1989		Players Software
Cobra's Arc	1986		Dinamic
Codename MAT	1984		Micromega
Colony	1987		Bulldog Software
Colossus 4 Chess	1986		CDS Software
Colossal Adventure	1983		Level 9
Colour of Magic, The	1986		Delta 4
Comando Quatro	1988		Zigurat Software
Comando Tracer	1988		Dinamic
Combat School	1987		Ocean Software
Comet Encounter	1986		Livewire Software
Comet Game, The	1986		Firebird Software
Commando	1985		Elite Systems
Compendium	1987		Gremlin Graphics
Computer Scrabble	1985		Leisure Genius
Computer Scrabble Deluxe	1987		Leisure Genius
Con-Quest	1986		Mastertronic
Confuzion	1985		Incentive Software
Conspiration de l'An III	1988		Ubi Soft
Contamination	1985		ERE Informatique
Continental Circus	1989		Virgin Games
Contra (See Gryzor)	1987		Ocean Software
Contraption	1985		Audiogenic
Copout	1986		Mikro-Gen
Copter 271	1991		Loriciels
Corridor Conflict	1987		Power House Software
Corruption	1988		Magnetic Scrolls
Corsarios	1989		Opera Soft
Cosmic Sheriff	1989		Dinamic
Cosmic Shock Absorber	1987		Martech
Costa Capers	1985		Firebird Software
Count Duckula	1989		Alternative Software
Count Duckula 2	1992		Alternative Software
Countdown	1986		Macsen Software
Countdown to Doom	1987		Topologika
Cowboy Kidz	1990		Byte Back
Cozumel (La Diosa De Cozumel)	1990		Aventuras AD
Crack Down	1990		U.S. Gold
Crack-Up	1989		Atlantis Software
Cray-5	1987		Topo Soft
Crazy Cars	1988		Titus Software
Crazy Cars II	1989		Titus Software
Crazy Cars 3	1992		Titus Software
Crazy Golf	1984		Amsoft/Mr. Micro
Crazy Shot	1989		Loriciels
Cricket Crazy	1988		Alternative Software
Critical Mass	1985		Durell Software
Crossfire	1989		Atlantis Software
Crystal Castles	1986		U.S. Gold
Crystal Kingdom Dizzy	1992		Codemasters
Cubit!	1984		Amsoft/Mr. Micro
Curse of Sherwood, The	1987		Mastertronic
Custard Pie Factory	1985		Tynesoft
Cutthroats	1986		Infocom
Cyberball	1990		Domark/Tengen
Cyber Chicken	2013		AMC Soft
Cybernoid	1988		Hewson Consultants
Cybernoid II: The Revenge	1988		Hewson Consultants
Cyberun	1986		Ultimate Play the Game
Cybor	1987		Softhawk
Cycles: International Grand Prix Racing, The	1990		Accolade
Cylu	1985		Firebird Software
Cyrus II Chess	1985		Amsoft
D-Day	1992		Loriciels
DJ Puff	1992		Codemasters
Daley Thompson's Decathlon	1985		Ocean Software
Daley Thompson's Olympic Challenge	1988		Ocean Software
Daley Thompson's Supertest	1986		Ocean Software
Dam Busters, The	1984		U.S. Gold
Dame Scanner	1988		Chip Software
Dan Dare: Pilot of the Future	1986		Virgin Games
Dan Dare II: Mekon's Revenge	1987		Virgin Games
Dan Dare III: The Escape	1990		Virgin Games
Dandy	1987		Electric Dreams
Danger Mouse in Double Trouble	1985		Creative Sparks
Danger Mouse in Makin' Whoopee	1985		Creative Sparks
Dark Fusion	1988		Gremlin Graphics
Dark Sceptre	1987		Firebird
Dark Side	1988		Incentive Software
Darkman	1991		Ocean Software
Darkwurlde	1986		Top Ten Software
Dawnssley	1986		Top Ten Software
Deactivators	1986		Reaktor
Deadline	1986		Infocom
Deadly Evil	1990		Players Software
Death Stalker	1988		Codemasters
Death Wish 3	1987		Gremlin Graphics
Death or Glory	1987		CRL Group
Defcom	1986		Quicksilva
Defcom 1	1989		Iber Soft
Defender of the Crown	1989		Cinemaware
Defenders of the Earth	1990		Enigma Variations Software
Deflektor	1987		Gremlin Graphics
Deliverance: Stormlord II	1990		Hewson Consultants
Demon's Revenge	1988		Firebird Software
Demon Lord	1985		Airstrip-One
Dervish	1988		Power House Software
Des Chiffres et des Lettres	1987		Loriciels
Desert Fox	1985		Accolade
Desperado	1987		Topo Soft
Desperado 2	1989		Topo Soft
Despotik Design	1987		ERE Informatique
Devil's Crown, The	1985		Probe Software
Diamond Mine	1985		Blue Ribbon
Diamond Mine II	1985		Blue Ribbon
Dianne	1985		Loriciels
Dick Tracy	1991		Disney
Die Alien Slime	1989		Mastertronic
Digger Barnes	1985		Cable Software
Dive Bomber	1988		Acme Animation
Dive-Dive-Dive	1987		Tynesoft
Dizzy	1987		Codemasters
Dizzy Dice	1987		Players Software
Dizzy Down the Rapids	1991		Codemasters
Dizzy Panic	1990		Codemasters
Dizzy: Prince of the Yolkfolk	1991		Codemasters
Doctor Who and the Mines of Terror	1986		Micro Power
Dodgy Geezers	1987		Melbourne House
Dogsbody	1985		Bug Byte
Dominator	1989		System 3 Software
Dominoes	1990		Blue Ribbon Software
Don Quijote	1987		Dinamic
Don't Panic	1985		Firebird Software
Donald's Alphabet Chase	1991		Disney Software
Donkey Kong	1986		Ocean Software
Doodlebug	1987		Players Software
Doomdark's Revenge	1985		Beyond Software
Doomsday Blues	1985		ERE Informatique
Doors of Doom	1985		Amsoft/Gem Software
Doppleganger	1985		Alligata
Double Dragon	1988		Virgin Games
Double Dragon 2: The Revenge	1989		Virgin Games
Double Dragon 3: The Rosetta Stone	1991		Storm Software
Downhill Challenge	1988		Loriciels
Dr. Doom's Revenge	1989		Empire Interactive
Dr. Scrimes' Spook School	1988		Mastertronic
Dracula	1986		CRL Group
Dragon Breed	1991		Activision
Dragon Spirit	1989		Domark
Dragon's Gold	1985		Amsoft/Romik
Dragon's Lair	1987		Software Projects
Dragons of Flame	1989		U.S. Gold
Dragontorc	1985		Hewson Consultants
Dream Warrior	1988		U.S. Gold
Driller	1987		Incentive Software
Druid	1986		Firebird Software
Duct, The	1988		Gremlin Graphics
Duel 2000			Coktel Vision
Duel: Test Drive II, The	1989		Accolade
Duet	1987		Hit Pak
Dun Darach	1985		Gargoyle Games
Dungeon Adventure	1983		Level 9
Dungeons, Amethysts, Alchemists 'n' Everythin'	1987		Atlantis Software
Dustin	1986		Dinamic
Dwarf	1987		Softhawk
Dynamic Duo	1988		Firebird Software
Dynamite Dan	1985		Mirrorsoft
Dynamite Dan II	1986		Mirrorsoft
Dynamite Düx	1989		Activision
Dynamix	1989		Mastertronic
Dynasty Wars	1990		U.S. Gold
E-Motion	1990		U.S. Gold
Edd the Duck	1990		Impulze
Eidolon, The	1986		Activision/Lucasfilm
El Cid	1987		Dro Soft
El Juego de la Oca	1989		Zafiro Software
El Poder Oscuro	1988		Zigurat Software
Electric Wonderland	1986		Gasoline
Electro Freddy	1984		Amsoft
Elektra Glide	1987		English Software
Elevator Action	1987		Quicksilva
Elidon	1985		Orpheus Software
Eliminator	1988		Hewson Consultants
Elite	1986		Firebird Software
Elven Warrior	1989		Players Software
Emerald Isle	1985		Level 9
Emilio Butragueño Fútbol	1988		Topo Soft/Ocean Software
Emlyn Hughes Arcade Quiz	1990		Audiogenic
Emlyn Hughes International Soccer	1989		Audiogenic
Empire!	1986		Firebird Software
Empire Strikes Back, The	1988		Domark
Enchanted	1989		Positive Software
Enchanter	1986		Infocom
Enduro Racer	1987		Activision
Energy (video game)	1987		Mastertronic
The Enforcer (video game)	1990		Trojan Software
Enlightenment: Druid II	1988		Firebird Software
Equinox	1986		Mikro-Gen
Er*Bert	1984		Microbyte
Erik the Viking	1984		Mosaic Publishing/Level 9
Escape from Singe's Castle	1987		Software Projects
Escape from the Planet of the Robot Monsters	1990		Domark/Tengen
ESWAT Cyber Police	1990		U.S. Gold
European Soccer Challenge	1990		Players Software
European Superleague	1991		CDS Software
Evening Star	1987		Hewson Consultants
Every Second Counts	1988		TV Games
Everyone's a Wally	1985		Mikro-Gen
Evil Donjon	1989		Genesis Software
EXIT	1988		Ubi Soft
Exolon	1987		Hewson Consultants
The Experience	1986		Players Software
Exploding Wall	1989		Byte Back
Explorer-	1987		Electric Dreams
Express Raider	1987		U.S. Gold
Exterminator	1991		Audiogenic
Extreme	1991		Digital Integration Ltd.
Eye	1988		Endurance Software
F-1 Tornado Simulator	1990		Zeppelin Games
F-15 Strike Eagle	1986		MicroProse
F-16 Combat Pilot	1989		Digital Integration Ltd.
Fairlight	1986		The Edge Software
Fairlight II	1986		The Edge Software
The Famous Five (video game)	1991		Enigma Variations Software
Fantasia Diamond	1984		Hewson Consultants
Fantastic Voyage (video game)	1984		Amsoft
Fantasy World Dizzy	1989		Codemasters
Fast Food	1989		Codemasters
The Fear (1987 video game)	1987		Mastertronic
Fer et Flamme	1986		Ubisoft
Fernandez Must Die	1988		Image Works
Feud	1987		Bulldog Software
Fiendish Freddy's Big Top O'Fun	1990		Mindscape
The Fifth Quadrant (video game)	1987		Bubble Bus
Fighter Bomber	1990		Activision
Fighting Soccer	1989		Activision
Fighting Warrior (video game)	1985		Melbourne House
Final Assault	1987		Epyx
Final Fight	1991		U.S. Gold
Finders Keepers	1986		Mastertronic
Fire and Forget (video game)	1988		Titus Software
Fire and Forget II	1990		Titus Software
Fire! (video game)	1990		New Deal Productions
Firelord	1986		Hewson Consultants
Fireman Sam (video game)	1992		Alternative Software
Firetrap (video game)	1988		Electric Dreams
Firezone	1988		Personal Software Services
First Past the Post (video game)	1991		Cult Software
Five-a-Side Soccer	1986		Mastertronic
Five-a-Side Footy	1988		Silverbird
Flash (video game)	1987		Loriciels
Flash Gordon	1986		Mastertronic
Flimbo's Quest	1990		System 3 Software
Flippit (video game)	1988		Splash (video game company)
Fluff (video game)	1994		Radical Software (UK)
Flunky	1987		Piranha Games
Flying Shark	1988		Firebird Software
Flyspy (video game)	1986		Mastertronic
Football Champions (video game)	1990		Cult Software
Football Frenzy (video game)	1987		Alternative Software
Football Manager	1984		Addictive Software
Football Manager 2	1988		Addictive Software
Football Manager 3	1992		Addictive Software
Football Manager World Cup Edition	1990		Addictive Software
Footballer of the Year (video game)	1986		Gremlin Graphics
Footballer of the Year 2	1989		Gremlin Graphics
The Footballer (video game)	1990		Cult Software
For Gold or Glory	1988		Alternative Software
Forbidden Planet (video game)	1986		Design Design
The Forest at World's End	1985		Interceptor Software
Forestland (video game)	1986		Supersoft
Forgotten Worlds	1989		U.S. Gold
Formula 1 Simulator	1985		Mastertronic
Formula One	1985		CRL Group
Forteresse	1987		Loriciels
Fourth Protocol, The	1986		Century Communications
Frank 'n' Stein	1985		Amsoft/PSS
Frank Bruno's Boxing	1985		Elite Systems
Frankenstein	1987		CRL Group
Frankie Goes to Hollywood	1985		Ocean Software
Fred	1984		Indescomp Software
Freddy Hardest	1987		Dinamic
Freedom Fighter	1988		Power House Software
Friday the 13th: The Computer Game	1986		Domark
Froggy (video game)	1985		R&B Software
Frontline (video game)	1988		Zeppelin Games
Frost Byte (video game)	1986		Mikro-Gen
Fruit Machine (video game)	1984		Amsoft
Fruit Machine Simulator	1988		Codemasters
Fruit Machine Simulator 2	1990		Codemasters
Fruity Frank	1984		Kuma Software
Fu-Kung in Las Vegas (video game)	1984		Amsoft/Romik
Fugitif (video game)	1991		Lankhor
Fun School 1	1986		Database Educational Software
Fun School 2	1989		Database Educational Software
Fun School 3	1991		Database Educational Software
Fun School 4	1992		Europress Software
Future Bike Simulator	1990		Hi-Tec Software
Future Knight	1986		Gremlin Graphics
G-LOC R360	1991		U.S. Gold
Gabrielle	1987		Ubi Soft
Galachip	1985		Chip Software
Galactic Conqueror	1988		Titus Software
Galactic Games	1987		Activision
Galactic Plague, The	1984		Amsoft
Galaxia	1984		Kuma Software
Galaxy Force	1989		Activision
Galivan	1986		Imagine Software
Gallitron	1987		Bulldog Software
Game Over	1987		Dinamic
Game Over II	1988		Dinamic/Imagine Software
Game of Dragons, The	1985		Amsoft
Games: Summer Edition, The	1989		U.S. Gold/Epyx
Garfield: Big, Fat, Hairy Deal	1988		The Edge Software
Garfield: Winter's Tail	1989		The Edge Software
Gary Lineker's Hot-Shot!	1988		Gremlin Graphics
Gauntlet	1984		Micro Power
Gauntlet	1987		U.S. Gold
Gauntlet II	1988		U.S. Gold
Gauntlet III: The Final Quest	1991		U.S. Gold
Gazza II	1990		Empire Interactive
Gazza's Superstar Soccer	1989		Empire Interactive
GBA Championship Basketball: Two-on-Two	1986		Activision
Gee Bee Air Rally	1987		Activision
Gemini Wing	1989		Virgin Games
Get Dexter	1986		ERE Informatique/PSS
Ghost Hunters	1987		Codemasters
Ghostbusters	1985		Activision
Ghostbusters II	1989		Activision
Ghosts 'n Goblins	1986		Elite Systems
Ghouls	1985		Micro Power
Ghouls 'n' Ghosts	1989		U.S. Gold
GI Hero	1988		Firebird Software
Giant Killer			Topologika
Gilligan's Gold	1984		Ocean Software
Gladiator	1986		Domark
Glass	1986		Quicksilva
Glen Hoddle Soccer	1985		Amsoft
Glider Rider	1986		Quicksilva
Gnome Ranger	1987		Level 9
Golden Axe	1990		Virgin Games
Golden Basket	1990		Opera Soft
Golden Path	1986		Amsoft
Goliath	1986		Rainbow Productions
Gonzzálezz	1989		Opera Soft
Goody	1987		Opera Soft
GP Formula 1 Simulator	1991		Zigurat Software
Graham Gooch's Test Cricket	1986		Audiogenic
Grand Prix	1989		D&H Games
Grand Prix 500 2	1991		Microïds
Grand Prix 500cc	1986		Microïds
Grand Prix Circuit	1990		Accolade
Grand Prix Driver	1984		Amsoft/Britannia Software
Grand Prix Simulator	1987		Codemasters
Grand Prix Simulator 2	1989		Codemasters
Grange Hill	1987		Argus Press Software
Granny's Garden	1987		Satchel
Great Escape, The	1986		Ocean Software
Great Giana Sisters, The	1988		Rainbow Arts
Great Gurianos	1987		Hit Pak
Grebit			Alternative Software
Green Beret	1986		Imagine Software
Gregory Loses his Clock	1989		Mastertronic
Grell and Falla	1992		Codemasters
Gremlins: The Adventure	1985		Adventure International
Gremlins 2: The New Batch	1990		Topo Soft
Greyfell	1987		Starlight Software
Grot breakout			Todal Software
Growing Pains of Adrian Mole, The	1986		Virgin Games/Level 9
Gryzor	1987		Ocean Software
Guardian Angel, The	1990		Codemasters
Guardian II: Revenge of the Mutants	1990		Hi-Tec Software
Guardians	1991		Loriciels
Guerrilla War	1988		Imagine Software
Guild of Thieves, The	1987		Rainbird Software/Magnetic Scrolls
Guillermo Tell	1989		Opera Soft
Gunfright	1986		Ultimate Play the Game
Gunship	1986		MicroProse
Gunsmoke	1987		Topo Soft/U.S. Gold
Gunstar	1987		Firebird Software
Gutter	1985		ERE Informatique
Guzzler	1986		Players Software
Gyroscope	1986		Melbourne House
Hacker	1985		Gremlin Graphics
Hacker II: The Doomsday Papers	1986		Activision
Halls of the Things	1985		Design Design
Hammer Boy	1991		Dinamic
Hammerfist	1990		Vivid Image
Hammerhead	1992		Zigurat Software
Hamsters en Folie	1989		Generation 5
Hard Drivin'	1989		Domark/Tengen
Hard Hat Mack	1985		Ariolasoft/Electronic Arts
Hareraiser	1984		Haresoft
Harricana	1990		Loriciels
Harrier Attack	1984		Amsoft/Durell
Harvey Headbanger	1986		Firebird Software
H.A.T.E.	1989		Gremlin Graphics
Haunted Hedges	1984		Amsoft/Micromega
Havoc	1990		Players Software
Hawk Storm	1990		Players Software
Head Over Heels	1987		Ocean Software
Heartland	1986		Odin Computer Graphics
Heavy on the Magick	1986		Gargoyle Games
Help Inc.	1993		WoW Software
Helter Skelter	1991		Audiogenic
Hercules: Slayer of the Damned	1988		Gremlin Graphics
H.E.R.O. (Amstrad Port)	2005		Flynn (Programmer)
HeroQuest	1991		Gremlin Graphics
Hero of the Golden Talisman	1986		Mastertronic
Herobotix	1988		Rack It
Heroes of Karn	1985		Interceptor Software
Hezarin			Topologika
Hi Rise	1986		Bubble Bus
Hideous	1992		Alternative Software
High Frontier	1987		Activision
High Steel	1989		Screen 7
Highlander	1986		Ocean Software
Highway Encounter	1985		Vortex Software
Highway Patrol	1989		Microïds
Hit Squad, The	1989		Codemasters
Hitchhiker's Guide to the Galaxy, The	1986		Infocom
HKM (Human Killing Machine)	1989		U.S. Gold
Hobbit, The			Melbourne House
Hobgoblin	1991		Atlantis Software
Hold-Up	1984		ERE Informatique
Holdfast	1984		Kuma Software
Hollywood Hijinx	1986		Infocom
Hollywood or Bust	1986		Mastertronic
Holocauste	1988		MBC Software
Homerunner	1984		Amsoft
Hong Kong Phooey	1990		Hi-Tec Software
Hopper Copper	1989		Silverbird
Hoppin' Mad	1988		Elite Systems
Hostages	1990		Infogrames
HotShot	1988		Addictive Software
How to Be a Hero	1987		Mastertronic
How to be a Complete Bastard	1987		Virgin Games
Howard the Duck	1987		Activision
Hudson Hawk	1991		Ocean Software
Humphrey	1988		Zigurat Software
Hunchback	1984		Amsoft/Ocean Software
Hunchback II: Quasimodo's Revenge	1985		Ocean Software
Hundra	1987		Dinamic
Hunt for Red October: The Movie	1991		Grandslam Entertainment
Hustler	1985		Bubble Bus
Hydrofool	1987		FTL
Hyper Sports	1986		Imagine Software
Hyperbowl	1986		Mastertronic
I Alien	1988		CRL Group
I, Ball	1987		Firebird Software
I, Ball II: Quest for the Past	1987		Firebird Software
Ice Breaker	1990		Topo Soft
Ikari Warriors	1986		Elite Systems
Imagination	1987		Firebird Software
Impact	1988		Audiogenic
Impossaball	1987		Hewson Consultants
Impossamole	1990		Gremlin Graphics
Impossible Mission	1986		Epyx
Impossible Mission II	1988		Epyx
Incredible Shrinking Sphere	1989		Electric Dreams Software
Indiana Jones and the Last Crusade	1989		U.S. Gold
Indiana Jones and the Temple of Doom	1987		U.S. Gold
Indoor Sports	1987		Databyte//Mindscape
Inertie	1987		Ubi Soft
Infernal House	1991		Lankhor
Infernal Runner	1985		Loriciels
Infidel	1986		Infocom
Infiltrator	1986		U.S. Gold/Mindscape
Ingrid's Back	1988		Level 9
Inheritance, The	1986		Infogrames
Inspector Hecti in the Interchange	1991		Hi-Tec Software
Inside Outing	1987		The Edge Software
Inspector Gadget and the Circus of Fear	1987		Melbourne House
International 3D Tennis	1990		Palace Software
International Football	1989		Cult Software
International Karate	1986		System 3
International Karate +	1988		System 3
International Ninja Rabbits	1991		Microvalue
International Rugby Simulator	1988		Codemasters
International Speedway	1988		Silverbird
Into Oblivion	1986		Mastertronic
Into the Eagle's Nest	1987		Pandora Software
Invitation	1987		Loriciels
Iron Lord	1990		Ubi Soft
Iron Sphere	2006		Cronosoft
Island of Dr. Destructo, The	1987		Bulldog Software
ISS	1989		Electric Dreams
Italian Supercar	1990		Codemasters
Italy 1990	1990		U.S. Gold
Iznogoud	1987		Infogrames
Jack Nicklaus' Greatest 18 Holes of Major Championship Golf	1989		Accolade
Jack the Nipper	1986		Gremlin Graphics
Jack the Nipper II	1987		Gremlin Graphics
Jack the Ripper	1987		CRL Group
Jail Break	1986		Konami
Jammin'	1985		Amsoft/Taskset
Jet Bike Simulator	1988		Codemasters
Jet Boot Jack	1984		Amsoft/English Software
Jet Set Willy	1985		Software Projects
Jet Set Willy II	1985		Software Projects
Jewels of Darkness	1986		Rainbird Software/Level 9
Jim Power in Mutant Planet	1992		Loriciels
Jimmy Business	1985		Excellence Software
Jimmy's Soccer Manager	1992		Beyond Belief Software
Jinks	1989		Rainbow Arts
Jinxter	1988		Rainbird Software/Magnetic Scrolls
Jocky Wilson's Darts Challenge	1991		Zeppelin Games
Joe Blade	1987		Players Software
Joe Blade 2	1988		Players Software
Joe Blade 3	1989		Players Software
John Elway's Quarterback	1987		Virgin Games
Jonny Quest	1991		Hi-Tec Software
Juggernaut	1985		CRL Group
Jump	1991		Zigurat Software
Jungle Jane	1986		Bug Byte
Jungle Warfare	1989		Mastertronic
Jungle Warrior	1990		Zigurat Software
Kaiser	1986		Ariolasoft
Kane	1986		Mastertronic
Karateka	1990		Microïds/Broderbund
Karl's Treasure Hunt	1984		Software Projects
Karnov	1988		Activision
Kat Trap	1987		Streetwise Software
Kenny Dalglish Soccer Manager	1990		Zeppelin Games
Kenny Dalglish Soccer Match	1990		Impressions
Kentilla	1986		Mastertronic
Kentucky Racing	1990		Alternative Software
Kettle	1986		Alligata
Key Factor, The	1985		Amsoft
Kick Off	1989		Anco Software
Kikstart 2	1987		Mastertronic
Killapede	1986		Players Software
Killer Cobra	1987		Mastertronic
Killer Gorilla	1984		Micropower Software
Killer Ring	1987		Reaktör
Killerball	1991		Microïds
Kinetik	1987		Firebird Software
Kingdom of Hamil			Topologika
Klax	1990		Domark/Tengen
Knight Force	1989		Titus Software
Knight Games	1986		English Software
Knight Ghosts	1988		Juliet Software
Knight Lore	1985		Ultimate Play the Game
Knight Orc	1987		Rainbird Software/Level 9
Knight Rider	1986		Ocean Software
Knight Tyme	1986		Mastertronic
Knightmare	1987		Activision
Kobayashi Naru	1987		Mastertronic
Kokotoni Wilf	1984		Elite Systems
Konami's Ping Pong	1985		Konami
Kong Strikes Back!	1985		Ocean Software
Koronis Rift	1987		Activision
Krakout	1987		Gremlin Graphics
Kung-Fu Master	1986		U.S. Gold
Kwah?	1986		Melbourne House
Kwik Snax	1990		Codemasters
L.A. SWAT	1987		Mastertronic
L'Affaire Santa Fe	1988		Infogrames
L'Aigle d'Or	1986		Loriciels
L'Aigle d'Or: Le Retour	1992		Loriciels
L'Anneau de Zengara	1987		Ubi Soft
L'Ile	1988		Ubi Soft
L'Oeil de Set	1987		Ubi Soft
La Abadía del Crimen	1988		Opera Soft
La Chose de Grotemburg	1987		Ubi Soft
La Crypte des Maudits	1991		Lankhor
La Dernière Mission	1988		MBC Software
La Espada Sagrada	1990		Topo Soft
La Geste d'Artillac	1986		Infogrames
La malédiction	1991		Lankhor
La Secte Noire	1990		Lankhor
Lancelot	1988		Mandarin Software/Level 9
Las Vegas Casino	1989		Zeppelin Games
Laser Squad	1989		Blade Software
Laserwarp	1984		Amsoft/Mikro-Gen
Last Days of Doom			Topologika
Last Duel	1989		U.S. Gold
Last Mission, The	1987		Opera Soft
Last Ninja 2	1988		System 3 Software
Last V8, The	1986		Mastertronic
Lawn Tennis	1987		Mastertronic
Lazer Tag	1988		Go! Software
Le Chevalier Blanc	1987		Cobra Soft
Le Manoir de Mortevielle	1988		Lankhor
Le Manoir du Comte Frozarda	1988		MBC Software
Le Millionnaire	1985		ERE Informatique
Le Mystère de Kikekankoi	1985		Loriciels
Le Nécromancien	1987		Ubi Soft
Le Trésor d'Ali Gator	1991		Lankhor
Leaderboard	1986		Access Software
Leather Goddesses of Phobos	1986		Infocom
Lee Enfield: Space Ace	1988		Infogrames
Legend of Apache Gold, The	1987		Incentive Software/Medallion Software
Legend of Kage, The	1986		Imagine Software
Legend of the Amazon Women	1986		U.S. Gold
Legions of Death	1987		Lothlorian
Lemmings	1992		Psygnosis
Les Aventures de Pépito au Mexique	1991		Belin Software
Les Passagers du Vent	1986		Infogrames
Les Passagers du Vent 2	1987		Infogrames
Les Pyramides d'Atlantys	1986		Microïds
Leviathan	1987		English Software
Life Expectancy Zero	1985		Blaby Software
Lifeterm	1987		Alternative Software
Light Corridor, The	1990		Infogrames
Light Force	1986		FTL
Line of Fire	1990		U.S. Gold
Little Computer People	1987		Activision
Little Puff in Dragonland	1989		Codemasters
Live and Let Die	1988		Domark/Elite Systems
Liverpool	1990		Grandslam Entertainment
Living Daylights, The	1987		Domark
Livingstone Supongo	1986		Opera Soft
Livingstone Supongo II	1989		Opera Soft
Locomotion	1985		Mastertronic
Lode Runner	1989		Loriciels/Broderbund
Loopz	1991		Audiogenic
Lop Ears	1991		Players Software
Lord of the Rings: Game One	1985		Melbourne House
Lords of Chaos	1990		Blade Software
The Lords of Midnight	1984		Amsoft/Beyond Software
Lords of Time	1983		Level 9
Lorna	1990		Topo Soft
Los Inhumanos	1990		Delta Soft
Lost Caves and the Tomb of Doom	1989		Players Software
Lotus Esprit Turbo Challenge	1990		Gremlin Graphics
Lurking Horror, The	1987		Infocom
Macadam Bumper	1985		ERE Informatique
Mach 3	1987		Loriciels
Mad Mix Game	1988		Topo Soft
Mad Mix 2	1989		Topo Soft
Madballs	1988		Ocean Software
Magician's Ball, The	1985		Global Software
Magic Johnson's Basketball	1989		Melbourne House
Magicland Dizzy	1991		Codemasters
Manchester United	1990		Krisalis
Mandragore	1986		Infogrames
Mange Cailloux	1987		Ubi Soft
Manic Miner	1984		Amsoft/Software Projects
Maracaïbo	1986		Loriciels
Marble Madness Construction Set	1986		Melbourne House
Mario Bros.	1987		Ocean Software
Marmelade	1988		MBC Software
Marsport	1985		Gargoyle Games
Martianoids	1987		Ultimate Play the Game
Master of the Lamps	1985		Activision
Masterchess	1987		Mastertronic
Masters of Space	1994		Radical Software
Masters of the Universe: The Arcade Game	1987		U.S. Gold
Masters of the Universe: The Movie	1987		Gremlin Graphics
Masters of the Universe: The Super Adventure	1987		U.S. Gold
Mata Hari	1988		Loriciels
Match Day	1985		Ocean Software
Match Day II	1988		Ocean Software
Match Point	1985		Psion
Maze Mania	1989		Hewson Consultants
Mazie	1988		Zeppelin Games
Mega Apocalypse	1988		Martech
Mega-Bucks	1986		Firebird Software
Megablasters	1994		Radical Software
Megacorp	1987		Aventuras AD
Meganova	1988		Dinamic
Megaphoenix	1991		Dinamic
Megawar	1990		Genesis Software
Meltdown	1986		Alligata
Mercenary	1985		Novagen Software
MERCS	1991		U.S. Gold
Mermaid Madness	1986		Electric Dreams
Message from Andromeda	1984		Interceptor Software
Metal Army	1988		Players Software
Metalyx	1987		Alternative Software
Metro-Cross	1987		U.S. Gold
Metropolis	1988		Power House Software
Meurtres en Série	1987		Cobra Soft
MGT	1986		Loriciels
Miami Cobra GT	1991		Players Software
Miami Dice	1986		Bug Byte
Miami Vice	1986		Ocean Software
Michael Jackson's Moonwalker	1989		U.S. Gold
Mickey Mouse	1988		Gremlin Graphics
Micro Mouse Goes Debugging	1989		Mastertronic
Microball	1988		Alternative Software
MicroProse Soccer	1989		MicroProse
Midnight Resistance	1990		Ocean Software
MiG Busters	1990		Players Software
Mig 29 Soviet Fighter	1989		Codemasters
Mike Gunner	1988		Dinamic
Mike Read's Computer Pop Quiz	1988		Elite Systems
Mikie	1986		Imagine Software
Milk Race	1987		Mastertronic
Mindfighter	1988		Activision/Abstract Concepts
Mindshadow			Interplay Productions
Mindtrap	1989		Mastertronic
Mission Genocide	1987		Firebird Software
Mission Jupiter	1987		Codemasters
Mission Omega	1986		Mind Games Software
Mister Gas	1989		Xortrapa Soft
Misterio Del Nilo, El	1987		Zigurat Software
MLM 3D: Evasion de la Lune	1986		Chip Software
Mokowé	1990		Lankhor
Molecule Man	1986		Mastertronic
Monopoly	1985		Leisure Genius
Monsters of Murdac			Topologika
Monte Carlo Casino	1989		Codemasters
Monty Python's Flying Circus	1990		Virgin Games
Monty on the Run	1986		Gremlin Graphics
Monument	1991		Zeppelin Games
Moon Blaster	1990		Loriciels
Moon Buggy	1985		Anirog
Moon Cresta	1986		Incentive Software
Moonmist	1986		Infocom
Moontorc	1991		Atlantis Software
Mordons Quest	1985		Melbourne House
Morris Meets the Bikers	1984		Automata UK
Mortadelo y Filemòn (Clever & Smart)	1988		Magic Bytes
Mortadelo y Filemòn II: Safari Callejero	1989		Animagic
Mortville Manor	1987		Lankhor
Moto Cross Simulator	1989		Codemasters
Motor Massacre	1988		Gremlin Graphics
Motorbike Madness	1988		Mastertronic
Motos	1987		Mastertronic
Mountain Bike Simulator	1991		Codemasters
Mountie Mick's Death Ride	1987		Reaktör
MOVIE	1986		Imagine Software
Moving Target	1989		Players Software
Mr. Freeze	1984		Firebird Software
Mr. Heli	1989		Firebird Software
Mr. Pingo	1986		Rainbow Arts
Multi-Player Soccer Manager	1991		D&H Games
Munch-It	1985		Tynesoft
Mundial de Fútbol	1990		Opera Soft
Munsters, The	1989		Again Again
Mutan Zone	1988		Opera Soft
Mutant Fortress	1989		Players Software
Mutant Monty	1984		Amsoft/Artic Software
Mutants	1987		Ocean Software
Myrddin Flight Simulation	1985		Myrddin Software
Mystery of the Indus Valleys	1987		Alternative Software
Mystery of the Nile	1987		Firebird Software/Zigurat Software
Mystical	1990		Infogrames
Myth	1989		Magnetic Scrolls
Myth: History in the Making	1989		System 3 Software
Mythos	1990		Opera Soft
NARC	1990		Ocean Software
Navy Moves	1988		Dinamic
Navy SEALS	1991		Ocean Software
Nebulus	1988		Hewson Consultants
Necris-Dome, The	1986		Codemasters
NEIL	1988		Alternative Software
Nemesis	1987		Konami
Nemesis the Warlock	1987		Martech
Nether Earth	1987		Argus Press Software
Netherworld	1988		Hewson Consultants
Neverending Story, The	1985		Ocean Software
New York Warriors	1990		Virgin Games
New Zealand Story, The	1990		Ocean Software
NEXOR	1986		Design Design
Nigel Mansell's Grand Prix	1988		Martech
Nigel Mansell's World Championship	1993		Gremlin Graphics
Night Booster	1985		Cobra Soft
Night Hunter	1990		Ubi Soft
Night Raider	1988		Gremlin Graphics
Night Shift	1990		Lucasfilm Games
Nightshade	1986		Ultimate Play the Game
Ninja	1987		Entertainment USA
Ninja Commando	1988		Zeppelin Games
Ninja Hamster	1987		CRL Group
Ninja Massacre	1989		Codemasters
Ninja Master, The	1986		Firebird Software
Ninja Scooter Simulator	1988		Silverbird
Ninja Spirit	1990		Activision
Ninja Warriors, The	1989		Virgin Games
Nocturne	1986		Alpha Omega Software
Nodes of Yesod	1985		Odin Computer Graphics
NOMAD	1986		Ocean Software
Nonamed	1986		Dinamic
Nonterraqueous	1985		Mastertronic
North Star	1988		Gremlin Graphics
North and South	1991		Infogrames
Nosferatu the Vampyre	1986		Piranha
Nuclear Heist	1986		Players Software
Number 1	1986		Bug Byte
Obliterator	1988		Melbourne House
Obsidian	1985		Artic Software
Octoplex	1989		Mastertronic
Off Shore Warrior	1988		Titus Software
Official Father Christmas, The	1989		Alternative Software
Oh Mummy	1984		Amsoft/Gem Software
Olé	1987		Firebird Software
Olli and Lissa III: The Candlelight Adventure	1989		Codemasters
Olli and Lissa: The Ghost of Shilmoore Castle	1987		Firebird Software
Olympiad '86	1986		Atlantis Software
Omeyad	1989		Ubi Soft
On Cue	1987		Mastertronic
On the Oché	1984		Artic Software
On the Run	1985		Design Design
One Man and his Droid	1986		Mastertronic
Operation Gunship	1989		Codemasters
Operation Hanoi	1990		Players Software
Operation Hormuz	1989		Again Again
Operation Thunderbolt	1989		Ocean Software
Operation Wolf	1988		Ocean Software
Orion Prime	2009		CargoSoft
Orphée	1985		Loriciels
Out Run	1987		U.S. Gold
Out Run Europa	1991		U.S. Gold
Out of this World	1987		Reaktör
Outboard	1990		Loriciels
Outlaw	1990		Players Software
Overlander	1988		Elite Systems
Oxphar	1987		ERE Informatique
P-47: The Freedom Fighter	1990		Firebird Software
Pac-Land	1989		Grandslam Entertainment
Pac-Mania	1988		Grandslam Entertainment
Pang	1991		Ocean Software
Panic Dizzy	1991		Codemasters
Paperboy	1986		Elite Systems
Paperboy 2	1991		Mindscape Software
Para Academy	1990		Zeppelin Games
Para Assault Course	1988		Zeppelin Games
Parabola	1987		Firebird Software
Paranoia Complex, The	1989		Gremlin Graphics
Park Patrol	1987		Firebird Software
Pasteman Pat	1989		Silverbird
Pawn, The	1987		Rainbird Software/Magnetic Scrolls
Paws	1985		Artic Software
Peasant's Tale, A	1988		Crysys
Penalty Soccer	1990		Gamebusters
Penggy	1986		Chip Software
Peter Pack Rat	1989		Silverbird
Peter Shilton's Handball Maradona!	1986		Grandslam Entertainment
Phantom Club	1988		Ocean Software
Phantomas 2	1986		Dinamic Software
Pharaon	1987		Loriciels
Phileas Fogg's Balloon Battles	1991		Zeppelin Games
Philosopher's Quest	1987		Topologika
PHM Pegasus	1987		Electronic Arts
Pick 'n' Pile	1990		Ubi Soft
Pinball Dreams	1992		Digital Illusions CE
Pinball Magic	1990		Loriciels
Pinball Power	1989		Mastertronic
Ping Pong	1986		Imagine Software
Pink Panther	1988		Gremlin Graphics
Pipe Mania	1990		Empire Interactive
Pirates!	1987		MicroProse
Pit-Fighter	1991		Domark
Plaga Galàctica	1984		Amsoft
Planetfall	1986		Infocom
Plasmatron	1988		CRL Group
Platoon	1988		Ocean Software
Play your Cards Right	1986		Britannia Software
Plot, The	1987		Firebird Software
Plotting	1990		Ocean Software
Pneumatic Hammers	1987		Firebird Software
Pogostick Olympics	1987		Firebird Software
Poogaboo	1991		Opera Soft
Pop-Up	1990		Infogrames
Popeye	1986		Piranha Games
Popeye 2	1990		Alternative Software
Popeye 3	1992		Alternative Software
Postman Pat	1988		Alternative Software
Postman Pat 2	1989		Alternative Software
Postman Pat 3	1992		Alternative Software
Potsworth and Company	1992		Hi-Tec Software
Power Boat Simulator	1989		Codemasters
Power Drift	1989		Activision
Powerplay: The Game of the Gods	1986		Arcana Software
Predator	1988		Activision
Predator 2	1991		Image Works
Prehistorik	1991		Titus Software
Prehistorik 2	1993		Titus Software
The Price of Magik	1986		Level 9
Prince of Persia	1990		Microïds/Broderbund
Prison Riot	1990		Players Software
Prize, The	1985		Amsoft
Pro BMX Simulator	1988		Codemasters
Pro Boxing Simulator	1990		Codemasters
Pro Golf Simulator	1990		Codemasters
Pro Skateboard Simulator	1989		Codemasters
Pro Tennis Simulator	1989		Codemasters
Pro Tennis Tour	1990		Ubi Soft
Pro Soccer Simulator	1990		Codemasters
Prodigy, The	1986		Electric Dreams
Profanation	1987		Chip Software
Professional Ski Simulator	1987		Codemasters
Prohibition	1987		Infogrames
Protector	1989		Mastertronic
Psyborg	1992		Loriciels
Psycho Hopper	1989		Mastertronic
Psycho Pigs UXB	1988		U.S. Gold
Psycho Soldier	1988		Imagine Software
Pub Games	1987		Alligata
Pub Trivia	1989		Codemasters
Puffy's Saga	1989		Ubi Soft
Pulsoid	1988		Mastertronic
Punch and Judy	1989		Alternative Software
Punchy	1984		Amsoft
Purple Saturn Day	1989		Exxos Software
Puzznic	1990		Ocean Software
Pyjamarama	1984		Mikro-Gen
Pyra Mydya	1986		Bug Byte
Python	1986		Chip Software
Python Pete	1986		Optyx
Pépé Béquilles	1987		Softhawk
Q-10 Tank Buster	1991		Zeppelin Games
Qabbalah	1986		Amsoft
Qin	1987		ERE Informatique
Quack a Jack	1984		Amsoft
Quad	1987		Microïds
Quadrel	1991		Loriciels
Quartet	1987		Activision
Quest for the Golden Eggcup, The	1988		Mastertronic
Quick Draw McGraw	1990		Hi-Tec Software
Quiwi	1986		Kingsoft
R-Type	1988		Electric Dreams
R-Type (new version)	2012		Easter Egg
Race, The	1990		Players Software
Rad Ramp Racer	1989		Mastertronic
Radius	1987		Players Software
Radzone	1986		Mastertronic
Raid!!!	1985		U.S. Gold
Rainbow Islands	1989		Ocean Software
Rally Cross	1989		Anco Software
Rally Driver	1986		Hill MacGibbon
Rally II	1985		Amsoft/Loriciels
Rally Simulator	1988		Zeppelin Games
Rambo	1985		Ocean Software
Rambo: First Blood Part II	1986		Ocean Software
Rambo III	1988		Ocean Software
Rampage	1988		Activision
Ramparts	1988		Go! Software
Ranarama	1987		Hewson Consultants
Rasputin	1986		Firebird Software
Rastan	1988		Imagine Software
Raster Runner	1990		Mastertronic
Rasterscan	1987		Mastertronic
Rat Connection	1988		MBC Software
Rath-tha	1989		Positive Software
Real Ghostbusters, The	1989		Activision
Real Stunt Experts, The	1989		Alternative Software
Realm	1986		Firebird Software
Rebelstar	1987		Firebird Software
Reckless Rufus	1992		Alternative Software
Red Heat	1989		Ocean Software
Red LED	1987		Starlight Software
Red Moon			Level 9
Red Scorpion	1987		Quicksilva
Reflex	1987		Players Software
Relief Action	1987		Loriciels
REM	1986		Blaby Software
Renegade	1987		Imagine Software
Renegade III: The Final Chapter	1989		Imagine Software
Rescate en el Golfo	1990		Opera Soft
Rescue from Atlantis	1988		Dinamic
Rescue on Fractalus!	1986		Activision
Return to Doom	1988		Topologika
Return to Eden	1984		Level 9
Return to Oz	1986		U.S. Gold
Reveal	1988		Mastertronic
Revenge of the C5	1986		Atlantis Software
Revolution	1986		Vortex Software
Revolver	1988		Alternative Software
Rex	1989		Martech
Rick Dangerous	1989		Firebird Software
Rick Dangerous 2	1990		Micro Style
Ricochet (Firebird)	1987		Firebird Software
Ricochet (Blaby)	1986		Blaby Software
Riding the Rapids	1987		Players Software
Rig Attack	1985		Tynesoft
Rigel's Revenge	1987		Bulldog Software
Rik the Roadie	1988		Alternative Software
Road Blasters	1988		U.S. Gold
Road Runner	1987		U.S. Gold
Road Runner and Wile E. Coyote	1991		Hi-Tec Software
Robbbot	1986		ERE Informatique
Robin Hood	1986		Codemasters
Robin Hood: Legend Quest	1993		Codemasters
Robin of Sherlock	1986		CRL Group/Delta 4
Robinson Crusoe	1987		Coktel Vision
RoboCop	1988		Ocean Software
RoboCop 2	1991		Ocean Software
Robozone	1991		Image Works
Rock 'n' Roll	1989		Rainbow Arts
Rock 'n' Roller	1988		Topo Soft
Rock Raid	1985		Kuma Software
Rock Star Ate My Hamster	1989		Codemasters
Rockford	1988		Mastertronic
Rocky Horror Show, The	1985		CRL Group
Rodland	1991		Storm Software
Rogue	1988		Mastertronic
Rogue Trooper	1986		Piranha Games
Roland Ahoy!	1984		Amsoft
Roland Goes Digging	1984		Amsoft/Gem Software
Roland in Space	1985		Amsoft/Gem Software
Roland in Time	1985		Amsoft/Gem Software
Roland in the Caves	1984		Amsoft/Indescomp
Roland on the Ropes	1984		Amsoft/Indescomp
Rollaround	1988		Mastertronic
Rolling Thunder	1988		U.S. Gold
Room Ten	1986		CRL Group
The Royal Quest	1984		Timeslip Software
Ruff and Reddy	1990		Hi-Tec Software
Rugby Boss	1989		Alternative Software
Run for Gold	1986		Hill MacGibbon
Run the Gauntlet	1989		Ocean Software
Running Man, The	1989		Grandslam Entertainment
Rygar	1987		U.S. Gold
Sabotage	1988		Zeppelin Games
Saboteur	1986		Durell
Saboteur II: Avenging Angel	1987		Durell
Sabre Wulf	1985		Ultimate Play the Game
Sacred Armour of Antiriad, The	1986		Palace Software
Saga	1990		Lankhor
Sai Combat	1986		Mirrorsoft
Saigon Combat Unit	1989		Players Software
Saint and Greavsie	1989		Grandslam Entertainment
Salamander	1988		Imagine Software
Samantha Fox Strip Poker	1986		Martech
Samurai Trilogy	1987		Gremlin Graphics
Samurai Warrior: The Battles of Usagi Yojimbo	1988		Firebird Software
Santa's Christmas Capers	1990		Zeppelin Games
Sapiens	1986		Loriciels
Saracen	1987		Americana
SAS Combat Simulator	1988		Codemasters
SAS Strike Force	1987		Mikro-Gen
Satan	1989		Dinamic
Sauvez Yurk	1990		Ubi Soft
Savage	1988		Firebird Software
Scalextric	1987		Leisure Genius/Virgin Games
Scapeghost	1989		Level 9
Scientific	1987		Chip Software
Scooby-Doo	1986		Elite Systems
Scooby-Doo and Scrappy-Doo	1991		Hi-Tec Software
Scoop	1990		Generation 5
Score 3020	1988		Topo Soft
Scout Steps Out, The	1985		Amsoft
Scramble Spirits	1990		Grandslam Entertainment
Screwball	1986		Blue Ribbon Software
Scruples	1987		Leisure Genius
Scuba Kidz	1989		Silverbird
SDAW	1990		Lankhor
SDI	1989		Activision
Seabase Delta	1986		Firebird Software
Seastalker	1986		Infocom
Secret Diary of Adrian Mole, The	1985		Level 9/Mosaic Software
The Secret of Bastow Manor	1985		SoftGold Dotsoft
Seesaw	1985		Amsoft/Andromeda Software
Sentinel, The	1987		Firebird Software
Sepulcri	1986		Reaktör
Sergeant Seymour Robotcop	1992		Codemasters
Seymour Goes to Hollywood	1991		Codemasters
Sgrizam	1986		Dinamic
Shackled	1988		U.S. Gold
Shadow Dancer	1991		U.S. Gold
Shadowfire	1985		Beyond Software
Shadow Skimmer	1987		The Edge Software
Shadow Warriors	1990		Ocean Software
Shadow of the Beast	1990		Gremlin Graphics
Shadows of Mordor: Game Two of Lord of the Rings	1987		Melbourne House
Shanghai Karate	1988		Players Software
Shanghai Warriors	1989		Players Software
Shao Lin's Road	1987		The Edge Software
Shard of Inovar	1987		Bulldog Software
Shark	1989		Players Software
Sharkey's Moll	1991		Zeppelin Games
Sharpe's Deeds	1987		Incentive Software
Sherman M4	1990		Loriciels
Shinobi	1989		Virgin Games
Shockway Rider	1986		FTL
Shogun	1986		Virgin Games
Short Circuit	1987		Ocean Software
Shufflepuck Café	1989		Microïds/Broderbund
Side Arms	1987		U.S. Gold
Sideral War	1989		Delta Soft
Sidewalk	1987		Infogrames
Sigma 7	1986		Durell
Silent Service	1986		MicroProse
Silent Shadow	1988		Topo Soft
Silkworm	1988		Virgin Games
SimCity	1990	Maxis	Infogrames
Simpsons: Bart vs. the Space Mutants, The	1991		Ocean Software
Sir Fred	1985		Made in Spain
Sir Lancelot	1984		Melbourne House
Sirwood	1989		Opera Soft
Skate Crazy	1988		Gremlin Graphics
Skate Rock	1987		Bubble Bus
Skate or Die	1989		Electronic Arts
Skateball	1989		Ubisoft
Skateboard Joust	1988		Silverbird
Skateboard Kidz	1988		Silverbird
Skatin' USA	1990		Atlantis Software
Skull and Crossbones	1991		Domark/Tengen
Skweek	1989		Loriciels
Skyx	1988		Legend
Slap Fight	1987		Imagine Software
Sliders	1991		Microïds
Slightly Magic	1991		Codemasters
Slug	1988		Alternative Software
Sly Spy: Secret Agent	1990		Ocean Software
SMASHED	1987		Alternative Software
Smash TV	1991		Ocean Software
Smirking Horror, The	1991		WoW Software
Snoball in Hell	1989		Atlantis Software
Snooker	1983		Amsoft
Snooker Management	1990		Cult Software
Snowball	1983		Level 9
Soccer 86	1985		Activision/Loriciels
Soccer Challenge	1990		Alternative Software
Soccer Director	1990		GTI Software
Soccer Pinball	1992		Codemasters
Soccer Rivals	1991		Cult Software
Software House	1988		Cult Software
Sol Negro	1988		Opera Soft
Solar Coaster	1987		Optyx
Solar Empire	1990		Players Software
Solo	1989		Opera Soft
Solomon's Key	1987		U.S. Gold
Sonic Boom	1990		Activision
Sootland	1989		Zafiro Software
Sooty and Sweep	1989		Alternative Software
Sorcerer	1986		Infocom
Sorcerer Lord	1987		PSS
Sorcery+	1985		Amsoft/Virgin Games
Soul of a Robot	1986		Mastertronic
Southern Belle	1985		Hewson Consultants
Soviet	1991		Opera Soft
Space Ace	1987		Gremlin Graphics
Space Crusade	1992		Gremlin Graphics
Space Gun	1992		Ocean Software
Space Harrier	1986		Elite Systems
Space Harrier II	1990		Grandslam Entertainment
Space Rider	1990		Hi-Tec Software
Space Smugglers	1989		MHT Ingenieros
Spaced Out!	1987		Firebird Software
Spannerman	1984		Amsoft/Gem Software
Speed King	1986		Mastertronic
Speedzone	1988		Mastertronic
Spellbound	1986		Mastertronic
Spellbound Dizzy	1991		Codemasters
Spellbreaker	1986		Infocom
Sphaira	1989		Ubi Soft
Spherical	1990		Rainbow Arts
Spider-Man and Captain America in Doctor Doom's Revenge	1990		Empire Software
Spike in Transylvania	1991		Codemasters
Spiky Harold	1986		Firebird Software
Spindizzy	1986		Electric Dreams
Spindrone	1988		Atlantis Software
Spitfire 40	1986		Mirrorsoft
Spitting Image	1988		Domark
Splat!	1985		Amsoft/Incentive Software
Split Personalities	1986		Domark
Spooked	1989		Players Software
Spooky Castle	1990		Atlantis Software
Sport of Kings	1986		Mastertronic
Sporting Triangles	1989		CDS Software
Spy Hunter	1986		U.S. Gold
Spy Snatcher	1991		Topologika
Spy Who Loved Me, The	1991		Domark
Spy vs. Spy	1985		Beyond Software/First Star
Spy vs. Spy II: The Island Caper	1987		First Star
SRAM	1986		ERE Informatique
SRAM 2	1986		ERE Informatique
St. Dragon	1990		Storm Software
Stainless Steel	1986		Mikro-Gen
Stairway to Hell	1986		Software Invasion
Star Control	1990		Accolade
Star Driver	1994		Radical Software
Star Firebird Softwares	1986		Insight Software
Star Paws	1987		Software Projects
Star Raiders II	1987		Electric Dreams
Star Ranger	1986		Tynesoft
Star Sabre	2008		Cronosoft
Star Trooper	1988		Players Software
Star Wars	1988		Domark
Star Wars: Droids	1988		Mastertronic
Star Wars: Return of the Jedi	1988		Domark
Star Wreck	1987		Alternative Software
Starboy	1986		Gasoline
Starfox	1987		Reaktor
Starglider	1986		Rainbird Software
Starion	1985		Melbourne House
Starquake	1986		Bubble Bus
Starstrike II	1986		Firebird Software
Starting Blocks	1988		Coktel Vision
Stationfall	1987		Infocom
Stifflip & Co.	1987		Palace Software
Steel Eagle	1990		Players Software
Steg	1992		Codemasters
Steve McQueen Westphaser	1992		Loriciels
Stockmarket	1985		Amsoft/Argus Press Software
Stomp	1985		DK'Tronics
Stop-Ball	1988		Juliet Software
Storm	1986		Mastertronic
Storm Warrior	1988		Elite Systems
Stormbringer	1987		Mastertronic
Stormlord	1989		Hewson Consultants
Stranded	2006		Cronosoft
Streaker	1987		Bulldog Software
Street Cred Boxing	1989		Players Software
Street Cred Football	1989		Players Software
Street Fighter	1988		U.S. Gold
Street Gang	1988		Time Warp Software
Street Gang Football	1989		Codemasters
Street Hawk	1985		Ocean Software
Street Machine	1987		Software Invasion
Street Sports Basketball	1988		Epyx
Strider	1989		U.S. Gold
Strider II	1991		U.S. Gold
Strike!	1987		Mastertronic
Strike Force Harrier	1986		Mirrorsoft
Striker	1990		Cult Software
Striker Manager	1990		Cult Software
Striker in the Crypts of Trogan	1992		Codemasters
Stryfe	1986		ERE Informatique
S.T.U.N. Runner	1990		Domark
Stunt Bike Simulator	1988		Silverbird
Stunt Car Racer	1990		Micro Style
Stuntman Seymour	1992		Codemasters
Subbuteo	1990		Electronic Zoo/Goliath Software
Subsunk	1985		Firebird Software
Subterranean Stryker	1985		Amsoft/Insight Software
Subway Vigilante	1989		Players Software
Sultan's Maze	1984		Amsoft/Gem Software
Sun Star	1987		CRL Group
Super Cars	1990		Gremlin Graphics
Super Cycle	1987		U.S. Gold/Epyx
Super Hang-On	1988		Electric Dreams
Super Hero	1988		Codemasters
Super Monaco GP	1991		U.S. Gold
Super Off Road	1990		Virgin Games
Super Pipeline II	1985		Amsoft/Taskset
Super Robin Hood	1985		Codemasters
Super Scramble Simulator	1989		Gremlin Graphics
Super Seymour Saves the Planet	1992		Codemasters
Super Ski	1987		Microïds
Super Skweek	1991		Loriciels
Super Space Invaders	1991		Domark
Super Sports	1988		Gremlin Graphics
Super Sprint	1987		Electric Dreams
Super Stock Car	1989		Mastertronic
Super Stunt Man	1988		Codemasters
Super Tank Simulator	1989		Codemasters
Super Trolley	1988		Mastertronic
Super Wonder Boy in Monster Land	1989		Activision
Supercars	1990		Gremlin Graphics
Superkid	1990		Atlantis Software
Superkid in Space	1991		Atlantis Software
Superman: The Game	1986		Prism Leisure Corporation
Superman: The Man of Steel	1989		Tynesoft
Supernudge 2000	1989		Mastertronic
Superted: The Search for Spot	1990		Alternative Software
Supertrux	1988		Elite Systems
Surprise Surprise	1986		Central Solutions
Survivor	1987		Topo Soft
Survivors	1988		Atlantis Software
Survivre	1992		Lankhor
Suspended	1986		Infocom
Swap	1991		Microïds
Sweevo's World	1986		Gargoyle Games
Switchblade	1990		Gremlin Graphics
SWIV	1991		Storm Software
Sword Slayer	1988		Players Software
Sword of the Samurai	1992		Zeppelin Games
T-Bird	1989		Mastertronic
Tai-Pan	1987		Ocean Software Ltd.
Tales of the Arabian Nights	1985		Interceptor Software
Tanium	1988		Players Software
Tank Busters	1985		Design Design
Tapper	1986		Amsoft
Target Plus	1988		Dinamic
Target: Renegade	1988		Imagine Software
Targhan	1990		Silmarils Software
Task Force	1989		Players Software
Tau Ceti	1986		CRL Group
Technician Ted	1984		Hewson Consultants
Technocop	1988		Gremlin Graphics
Teenage Mutant Hero Turtles	1990		Image Works
Teenage Mutant Hero Turtles: The Coin-Op	1991		Image Works
Teenage Queen	1988		ERE Informatique
Tempest	1987		Electric Dreams
Tennis Cup	1990		Loriciels
Tennis Cup 2	1990		Loriciels
Terminator 2	1991		Ocean Software
Terminus	1986		Mastertronic
Terra Cognita	1986		Codemasters
Terramex	1988		Grandslam
Terres et Conquérants	1989		Ubi Soft
Terrormolinos	1985		Melbourne House
Tetris	1988		Mirrorsoft
Thanatos	1986		Durell
Theatre Europe	1985		PSS
They Stole a Million	1986		39 Steps
Thing Bounces Back	1987		Gremlin Graphics
Thing on a Spring	1986		Gremlin Graphics
Thing!	1988		Players Software
Thingy and the Doodahs	1987		Silverbird
Think!	1986		Ariolasoft
Thomas the Tank Engine	1990		Alternative Software
Three Weeks in Paradise	1986		Mikro-Gen
Through the Trap Door	1987		Piranha Games
Thrust	1986		Firebird Software
Thrust II	1987		Firebird Software
Thunder Blade	1988		U.S. Gold
Thunder Burner	1991		Loriciels
ThunderJaws	1991		Domark
Thundercats	1987		Elite Systems
Tiger Road	1987		Go! Software
Time Scanner	1989		Activision
Timelord	1985		Alpha Omega Software
Time and Magik	1988		Mandarin Software
Times of Lore	1989		Origin/Mindscape Software
Tintin on the Moon	1989		Infogrames
Tiny Skweeks, The	1991		Loriciels
Tir Na Nog	1984		Gargoyle Games
Titan	1989		Titus Software
Titanic	1988		Topo Soft
Titanic Blinky	1992		Zeppelin Games
Titus the Fox	1992		Titus Software
Toadrunner	1988		Ariolasoft
Tobruk	1987		Personal Software Services
Toi Acid Game	1989		Iber Soft
Tomcat	1989		Players Software
Toobin'	1989		Domark/Tengen
Top Cat	1991		Hi-Tec Software
Top Gun	1986		Ocean Software
Tornado Low Level	1985		Vortex Software
Total Eclipse	1988		Incentive Software
Total Eclipse II: The Sphinx Jinx	1989		Incentive Software
Total Recall	1991		Ocean Software
Tour 91	1991		Topo Soft
Tournament Snooker	1986		Magnificent 7 Software
Tracksuit Manager	1988		Goliath Software
Traffic	1985		Amsoft/Andromeda Software
Trailblazer	1986		Gremlin Graphics
Train: Escape to Normandy, The	1987		Accolade
Trakers	1991		Cybervision
Trance	1989		Remon
Transmuter	1987		Codemasters
Trantor: The Last Stormtrooper	1987		U.S. Gold
Trap	1987		Alligata
Trap Door, The	1986		Piranha Games
Trashman	1986		New Generation/Virgin Games
Treasure Island Dizzy	1989		Codemasters
Trial of Arnold Blackwood, The	1985		Nemesis Software
Triaxos	1987		Ariolasoft
Tribble Trouble	1985		Amsoft/Mr. Micro
Trigger	1989		Opera Soft
Trivia: The Ultimate Quest	1989		Shades Software
Trivial Pursuit Genus Edition	1986		Domark
Trivial Pursuit: A New Beginning	1988		Domark
Trollie Wallie	1986		Players Software
Tuareg	1988		Topo Soft
Tubaruba	1986		Advance
Turbo Boat Simulator	1988		Silverbird
Turbo Chopper	1989		Codemasters
Turbo Cup	1988		Loriciels
Turbo Esprit	1986		Durell
Turbo Girl	1988		Dinamic
Turbo Kart Racer	1990		Players Software
Turbo Outrun	1989		U.S. Gold
Turbo the Tortoise	1992		Hi-Tec Software/Codemasters
Turlogh le Rôdeur	1987		Cobra Soft
Turrican	1990		Rainbow Arts
Turrican II	1991		Rainbow Arts
Tusker	1989		System 3 Software
Twice Shy	1986		Mosaic Software
Twin Turbo V8	1988		Codemasters
Twinworld	1990		Ubi Soft
Typhoon	1988		Imagine Software
Ulises	1989		Opera Soft
Ultima Ratio	1987		Firebird Software
UN Squadron	1990		U.S. Gold
Untouchables, The	1989		Ocean Software
Up for Grabs	1988		Alternative Software
Uridium	1987		Hewson Consultants
V	1986		Ocean Software
Vampire	1986		Codemasters/Dinamic
Vector Ball	1988		Mastertronic
Vendetta	1990		System 3 Software
Venom	1988		Mastertronic
Vera Cruz Affair, The	1985		Infogrames
Very Big Cave Adventure, The	1986		CRL Group
Viaje al Centro de la Tierra	1989		Topo Soft
Victory Road	1988		Imagine Software
Video Card Arcade	1990		Blue Ribbon Software
Video Poker	1986		Entertainment USA
Vigilante	1989		U.S. Gold
Vindicator (The)	1988		Imagine Software Ltd
Vindicators	1988		Domark/Tengen
Vixen	1988		Martech
Viz: The Computer Game	1991		Virgin Games
Volley Ball	1987		Chip Software
Voo Doo Rage	1986		Artic Software
W.A.R.	1986		Martech
Wacky Darts	1992		Codemasters
Wacky Races	1992		Hi-Tec Software
Wanderer	1989		Elite Systems
War in Middle Earth	1988		Melbourne House
War Machine	1989		Players Software
Warhawk	1987		Firebird Software
Warlock	1987		The Edge Software
Warrior Plus	1986		Rainbow Productions
Way of the Exploding Fist, The	1985		Melbourne House
Way of the Tiger, The	1986		Gremlin Graphics
WEC Le Mans	1988		Imagine Software
Weetabix vs. the Titchies, The	1984		Romik
Wells and Fargo	1988		Topo Soft
Welltris	1990		Infogrames
Werewolves of London	1987		Viz Design/Ariolasoft
Werner	1987		Ariolasoft
West Bank	1986		Dinamic
Western Games	1987		Magic Bytes
Who Dares Wins II	1986		Alligata
Who Said That?	1994		Radical Software
Wibstars	1987		A&F Software
Wild Bunch, The	1984		Firebird
Wild Streets	1990		Titus Software
Wild West Seymour	1992		Codemasters
Willow Pattern, The	1986		Firebird Software
Willy Wino's Stag Night	1988		Silverbird
Wings of Fury	1990		Broderbund/Loriciels
Winter Games	1986		U.S. Gold/Epyx
Winter Wonderland	1986		Incentive Software
Wishbringer	1986		Infocom
Witness, The	1983		Infocom
Wiz-Biz	1987		Alternative Software
Wizard Willy	1989		Codemasters
Wizard Warz	1988		U.S. Gold
Wizard's Lair	1985		Bubble Bus
Wizball	1987		Ocean Software
Wolfman	1988		CRL Group
Wombles, The	1990		Alternative Software
Wonder Boy	1987		Activision
Wooky and Moty	1987		CRL Group
World Championship Boxing Manager	1990		Goliath Games
World Championship Soccer	1991		Elite Systems
World Class Leaderboard	1987		U.S. Gold
World Class Rugby	1991		Audiogenic Software
World Cup	1985		Artic Software
World Cup Carnival	1986		U.S. Gold
World Cup Challenge	1990		Players Software
World Cup Soccer: Italia '90	1990		Virgin Games
World Games	1986		Epyx
World Series Baseball	1985		Imagine Software
World Soccer League	1990		E&J Software
Worm in Paradise, The	1985		Level 9
Wrath of Olympus	1986		Alpha Omega Software
Wreckless Roger	1986		Blaby Software
Wrestling Superstars	1993		Codemasters
Wriggler (Blaby)	1985		Blaby Software
Wriggler (Romantic Robot)	1985		Romantic Robot
Wulf Pack	1988		Blue Ribbon Software
WWF WrestleMania	1991		Ocean Software
X-Out	1990		Rainbow Arts
Xanagrams	1984		Amsoft
Xarq	1986		Electric Dreams
Xcel	1987		Mastertronic
Xeno	1986		Binary Design
Xenon	1988		Melbourne House
Xenophobe	1988		Micro Style
Xevious	1986		U.S. Gold
XOR	1987		Logotron
Xybots	1989		Domark/Tengen
Xyphoes Fantasy	1991		Silmarils Software
Yabba Dabba Doo!	1986		Quicksilva
Yarkon Blues	1990		WoW Software
Yarkon Blues II: Space Station Zebra	1992		WoW Software
Yes, Prime Minister	1987		Mosaic Publishing
Yie Ar Kung-Fu	1985		Imagine Software
Yie Ar Kung-Fu 2: The Emperor Yie-Gah	1985		Imagine Software
Yogi Bear	1987		Piranha Games
Yogi Bear and Friends	1990		Hi-Tec Software
Yogi's Great Escape	1990		Hi-Tec Software
Young Ones, The	1986		Orpheus
Z	1986		Rino Software
Zampabolas	1990		System 4 Software
Zap't'Balls: The Advanced Edition	1993		Elmsoft
Zarkon	1987		Budgie Software
Zarxas	1987		Chip Software
Ziggurat	1987		Reaktör
Zoids: The Battle Begins	1986		Martech
Zolyx	1987		Firebird Software
Zombi	1986		Ubi Soft
Zona 0	1991		Topo Soft
Zone Trooper	1988		Gamebusters
Zorgos	1987		Deltacom
Zork I: The Great Underground Empire	1986		Infocom
Zork II: The Wizard of Frobozz	1986		Infocom
Zork III: The Dungeon Master	1986		Infocom
Zox 2099	1987		Loriciels
Zub	1986		Mastertronic
Zygy	1986		Infogrames
Zynaps	1987		Hewson Consultants

== See also ==
- Lists of video games
- List of Amstrad PCW games
