= Scott Orr =

American video game designer

- Occupations: Video ame designer Video game producer Corporate executive

Scott Orr is an American video game designer best known as the lead designer on the first video game console versions of Madden NFL Football. In 2001, Wired magazine named Orr on its list of "gamemaking gods." Orr‘s career in sports games spans over 20 years.

== Gamestar ==
In 1982, Orr founded Gamestar, a game publisher specializing in home computer sports games, where Orr was credited as either a designer or producer for:

- Starbowl Football (1982)
- Star League Baseball (1983)
- On-Court Tennis (1984)
- Championship Baseball (1986)
- GFL Championship Football (1985)
- Star Rank Boxing (1985)
- GBA Championship Basketball: Two-on-Two (1986)
- Star Rank Boxing II (1987)
- Top Fuel Eliminator (1987)
- Face Off! (1987)
- Gamestar Championship Sports Pack (1987)

Orr sold the company to Activision in 1986. He spent the late 1980s working for Activision, and then consulting for various games companies.

== Madden NFL Football ==
In 1990 EA producer Richard Hilleman hired Orr to re-design John Madden Football, then a disappointing Apple II game, for the Sega Genesis. Orr and Hilleman developed the game that became Madden NFL Football. Orr joined EA full-time in 1991 after the success of Madden on the Genesis, and supervised the production of Madden Football for the next ten years. He and his team also created the following EA Sports titles, each of which was updated annually:

- NHLPA Hockey
- NCAA Football
- Andretti Racing
- NASCAR Racing (later called NASCAR Thunder)
- Knockout Kings

He continued to work with Hilleman during much of this period, and both were promoted to corporate VP and senior management roles in EA product development.

During this time Orr produced two educational titles for EA Kids:

- Eagle Eye Mysteries, by Stormfront Studios
- Eagle Eye Mysteries in London

== Mobile games ==
In 2001, Orr resigned from EA and founded cell phone game design company Sorrent, an abbreviation of Scott Orr Entertainment. In 2004 Orr (and his brother Keith) were ejected from Sorrent by the board, and founded Bigdog Games to develop next-gen console and handheld games. Sorrent's name was changed to Glu Mobile in 2005, and the company went public with an IPO in 2007. In 2006 Bigdog Games expanded its charter into digital publishing and changed its name to D2C Games.
