= Dive Bomber =

A dive bomber is a bomber aircraft that dives directly at its targets.

Dive Bomber may also refer to:

- Dive Bomber (film)
- Dive Bomber (video game)
- Dive Bomber, a type of amusement ride
- Rat runner, someone who takes a circuitous shortcut around traffic

== See also ==
- Dive-bomb (disambiguation)
