= The Young Ones =

The Young One(s) or Young One(s) may refer to:

== Films ==
- The Young Ones (1961 film), a musical starring Cliff Richard
- The Young Ones (1973 film), a Taiwanese film, spoken in Mandarin
- The Young One, a 1960 English language film directed by Luis Buñuel, also called La joven
- The Young One (2016 film), a French-Portuguese film, original title Jeunesse
- Young Ones (film), a 2014 science fiction film

== Television ==
- The Young Ones (TV series), a 1980s British sitcom about four students living together
- The Young Ones, a 2010 British TV series about six well-known people in their 70s and 80s, which included Kenneth Kendall

== Music ==
- "The Young Ones" (song), title song to the film and a number-one 1962 single, by Cliff Richard and the Shadows
- The Young Ones (album), the soundtrack album to the 1961 film

== Other ==
- The Young Ones (video game), a video game based on the British comedy television series
