= Street Hawk (video game) =

1985 video game

Street Hawk is a video game based on the Street Hawk TV series. It was developed by Ocean Software in the 1980s for the ZX Spectrum home computer. When the original development work on the game stalled in 1985, a new version had to be quickly produced from scratch by their in-house team to fulfill orders for Kays Catalogues and never went on general release. This version is sometimes known as the "subscribers edition" as a it was also supposed to be sent as a gift to new subscribers of Crash magazine, but instead the magazine eventually had to offer a choice of other Ocean games—Ping Pong, Movie, Super Bowl and Green Beret—as alternatives.

Ocean went on to develop another version of the game for release in 1986 for the ZX Spectrum and Amstrad CPC. The Commodore 64 version was 90% complete but was canceled by Ocean due to lack of profitability from programming delays. In Spain it was distributed by Erbe Software with the name El Halcón Callejero.
