= Index of DOS games (Y) =

This is an index of DOS games.

This list has been split into multiple pages. Please use the Table of Contents to browse it.

Title	Released	Developer(s)	Publisher(s)
Yendorian Tales Book I: Chapter 2	1996	SW Games	Spectrum Pacific Publishing
Yendorian Tales: The Tyrants of Thaine	1997	SW Games	Spectrum Pacific Publishing
Yes, Prime Minister	1988	Oxford Digital Enterprises	Mosaic Publishing
Yogi Bear's Math Adventures	1990	Genus Microprogramming, Omega Software	Genus Microprogramming, Omega Software
Ys I: Ancient Ys Vanished	1989	Nihon Falcom	Nihon Falcom
Ys II: Ancient Ys Vanished – The Final Chapter	1989	Nihon Falcom	Nihon Falcom
