= Beach Buggy Simulator =

1988 video game

- Developer: Sysoft
- Publisher: Silverbird
- Platforms: ZX Spectrum, Commodore 64, Amstrad CPC
- Release: 1988
- Genre: Vehicular combat
- Modes: Single-player, multiplayer

Beach Buggy Simulator is a vehicular combat game released for the ZX Spectrum, Commodore 64, and Amstrad CPC in 1988.

== Gameplay ==
ZX Spectrum screenshot

In Beach Buggy Simulator, the players have to drive a beach buggy through several dune trials by jumping over the rocks and similar hazards, scattered along the way. The buggy is equipped with a gun for shooting down the helicopters that are passing by, trying to destroy the vehicle. The goal is to reach the finish line before the time limit runs out.

== Reception ==
Reception

Review scores
Publication	Score
Your Sinclair	8/10
Zzap!64	21%
Commodore Computing International	4/10
Commodore User	5/10
