= Phantom Club =

1987 video game

- Developers: Dusko Dimitrijevic, Dragoljub Andjelkovic
- Publisher: Ocean Software
- Platforms: Sinclair Spectrum, Amstrad CPC
- Release: 1987
- Genre: Arcade adventure
- Mode: Single-player

Phantom Club is an isometric 3D arcade adventure game released by Ocean in 1987 for the Sinclair Spectrum and Amstrad CPC.

== Plot ==
Plutus the Zelator, the lowest-ranked member of the Phantom Club of superheroes, must defeat Zarg and the other evil superheroes.

== Gameplay ==
The player controls Plutus the Zelator in his mission against Zarg and his minions. Plutus is armed with a freeze-ray to defend himself and complete his mission. A variety of hostile superheroes will try to kill him, each with different powers. Some of these enemies are indestructible and must be avoided. In addition, Plutus must avoid carnivorous plants, spiders, hostile robots, and other dangerous objects and creatures.

Useful objects encountered include:

- Spheres, which award extra lives
- Diamonds, extra speed
- Tubes, allow the game to be saved
- Movie Screens, when shot give details of additional missions

Plutus increases in rank as he progresses in the mission; when he reaches the rank of Ipsisimus he is ready to challenge Zarg.

== Development ==
Phantom Club was written by Serbian programmer Duško "The Duke" Dimitrijević, having previously programmed the game Movie.

== Reviews ==
Reception

Review scores
| Publication | Score |
|---|---|
| Amstrad Action | 71% |
| Crash | 55% |
| Sinclair User | 7/10 |
| Your Sinclair | 6/10 |

- Sinclair User: "... Phantom Club is pretty hard on the eyes because some of the colour choices are terrible - would you believe white on green, or purple on white?"
