= Star Wreck (video game) =

1987 video game

- Developer: Alternative Software
- Publisher: Alternative Software
- Designer: Charles A. Sharp
- Platforms: ZX Spectrum, Amstrad CPC, Commodore 64
- Release: 1987
- Genre: Interactive fiction
- Mode: Single-player

Star Wreck is a text adventure game written in 1987 by Charles A. Sharp. It was published by Alternative Software for the Spectrum 48k, Amstrad CPC, and Commodore 64. The game takes place in a parody of the Star Trek universe and the player takes on the role of Captain James T. Cake of the USS Paralysed.

== Development ==
Star Wreck was written using the Graphic Adventure Creator. After its initial publication in 1987, it also appeared in Alternative Software's compilation tape 4-Most Adventures, in 1991.

== Reception ==
Star Wreck was reviewed by Your Sinclair in December 1987, receiving 6 out of 10. Whilst enjoyable, the reviewer felt that the initial area (the Starship Paralysed) was too open, causing difficulties in working out what's going on.
