= Rally Driver =

1984 video game

- Developer: Five Ways Software Ltd.
- Publishers: Hill MacGibbon, Alternative Software Ltd.
- Platforms: ZX Spectrum, Amstrad CPC, Commodore 64
- Release: ZX Spectrum; EU: 1984; Amstrad CPC; EU: 1986; Commodore 64; EU: 1988
- Genre: Sim racing
- Mode: Single-player

Rally Driver is a racing and driving simulation game developed by Five Ways Software and published by Hill MacGibbon and Alternative Software. The game was initially released for the ZX Spectrum in 1984, followed by releases for the Amstrad CPC in 1986 and the Commodore 64 in 1988.

The game offers a first-person perspective and supports single-player mode.

== Gameplay ==
Rally Driver is a realistic motor rally simulation that challenges players to complete three stages of courses within qualifying times. The game comes with an instruction book and includes a map of the roads for each stage.

Players must plan their route carefully, considering the different hazards on the roads such as mud, water, and weather conditions that can affect their performance. Longer routes may be necessary to avoid flooded sections, while shortcuts can save time. Learning the course is helpful, but mistakes such as going off-road or crashing result in penalty times.

The game relies less on reflexes and more on good planning and driving skill. Players must drive through time controls in correct order, stopping to check in and enter a two-letter code displayed on a sign before the control gate to avoid penalties. Road reports are shown at the bottom of the screen while passing time controls.

The screen displays the player's view out of the front window, showing the passing scenery of forests, fields, and towns, as well as the road ahead and horizon. The dashboard features a moving steering wheel, a speedometer, a clock for time taken, a hand brake indicator, penalty time, turn indicators, and distance traveled.

Between stages, a leaderboard shows the player's progress. Completing a stage by getting a top seven time (out of ten computer opponents) qualifies the player for the next, with each stage being larger and harder than the first.

== Reception ==
Reception

Review scores
Publication	Score
Amstrad Action	71%
Computer and Video Games	28/40
Your Sinclair	5/10

Rally Driver had generally favourable reviews. Magazines characterized it as a challenging rally driving simulation that captures the unique demands of being both navigator and driver. The game's intelligent design and strategic elements provided an engaging experience for enthusiasts of the genre, despite its simple graphics and sound.

Computer and Video Games reviewers found the game to be an effective and realistic rally driving simulation. Despite the simplistic graphics and sound, they considered graphics and sound adequate and appreciated the strategic aspect of navigation.

Amstrad Action reviewers described Rally Driver as an intelligently designed game that successfully simulated the driving skills required in a rally, setting it apart from average driving games. They noted the game's difficulty, particularly in qualifying, and the initially tough controls that become manageable with practice. The graphics were described as "reasonable", with reviewers noting slowdowns at screen updates. Overall, the magazine considered Rally Driver a challenging long-term experience with enjoyable random elements like cows on the road.

In contrast, Your Sinclair reviewers compared the updated budget release by Alternative to newer games, finding that it did not measure up to them. They suggested that the sparse graphics and jerky animation might not appeal to arcade game fans, but the game could still be appreciated at a lower price by those who enjoy serious simulations.
