= Barry McGuigan World Championship Boxing =

1985 video game

- Publishers: Gamestar / Activision; Mastertronic
- Programmer: Troy Lyndon
- Artist: Doug Barnett
- Platforms: Amstrad CPC, Commodore 64, Thomson MO5, ZX Spectrum
- Release: 1985
- Genre: Sports
- Modes: Single-player, multiplayer

Barry McGuigan World Championship Boxing is a British video game released in 1985 for the Amstrad CPC, Commodore 64, Thomson MO5 and ZX Spectrum by the Gamestar branch of Activision and later re-released by Mastertronic. It was titled Star Rank Boxing in the US (following the Gamestar naming convention: Star League Baseball, Starbowl Football).

== Gameplay ==
Spectrum screenshot

=== 1 player ===
The player controls a boxer as he boxes his way to the top, earning purse money along the way, progressing up the world rankings until he fights Barry McGuigan himself. Players can create a boxer and customize his style, race, hair and shorts. The player could also choose his next opponent, either at the same ranking, below or above, each with their own lead up time to the fight. The longer the player had until the fight the more time could be spent in the gym, allocating training weeks to the following activities: Weights, sparring, road work, heavy bag or light bag.

Each of these activities had a benefit on the boxer's stamina, strength and endurance. Roadwork, for example, helped with endurance, whilst weights and heavy bag helped with strength.

Before deciding which opponent to fight, a summary is shown of each detailing his attributes. The player can then decide whether take the opponent on. Picking an opponent who is above the player's boxer in the rankings will progress him quicker up the rankings and earn him more money. However, this is risky as higher-ranked fighters are stronger. Some opponents can be beaten quite quickly, whilst others require several rounds of boxing to defeat.

Whilst boxing the following moves can be employed: Cross, block, body punch, jab, hook and uppercut. At the end of each round a summary is given of points scored and the feeling of the audience as to their excitement levels.

=== 2 player ===
Each player can choose a boxer from the 20 available, and take part in a 12-round match.

== Reception ==
Reception

Review scores
Publication	Score
Crash	88%
Computer and Video Games	75%
Sinclair User	5/5
Your Sinclair	8/10

Rick Teverbaugh reviewed the game for Computer Gaming World, and stated that "My belief in sports games is that if they feel like the sport, they must be pretty good. But if they get your [sic] personally involved in the game as well, they must be great. Star Rank does both and I have no qualms about calling this a great game."

The game was very well received. Crash praised the options, graphical detail and animation. Sinclair User claimed it was "the best boxing game on the market, for realism it knocks the others for six. It's more complex than Frank Bruno's or Rocco", while Your Sinclair summarised it as "a top-ten contender in the software boxing championships". Computer Gamer said it was realistic, gripping and long-lasting. The game went to number 2 in the UK sales charts, behind M.O.V.I.E..
