= Shirley Muldowney's Top Fuel Challenge =

1987 video game

- Publisher: Cosmi Corporation
- Platform: Commodore 64
- Release: 1987
- Genre: Racing

Shirley Muldowney's Top Fuel Challenge is a 1987 video game published by Cosmi Corporation.

== Gameplay ==
Shirley Muldowney's Top Fuel Challenge is a game in which the player will need to make strategic decisions depending on the track conditions, which includes wins, losses, and crashes.

== Reception ==
David M. Wilson and Johnny L. Wilson reviewed Shirley Muldowney's Top Fuel Challenge with Top Fuel Eliminator for Computer Gaming World, and stated that "Of the two games, one must - note that TFE is more user-friendly. Whereas TFC simply notes the player's failures, TFE offers a full-scale evaluation of every qualifying run."

Commodore User were very critical of the game, stating the graphics were "abysmal" with "god-awful animation" and the sound "limited". Their conclusion was that the title "does succeed in being authentic in one respect. It's a real drag." It was rated 3/10.

Zzap!64 were similarly unimpressed, saying the 3D effect was "appalling" and the backdrops "dismal". The sound effects were said to be "feeble." Their conclusion was that it was "a slow, uninteresting and appallingly presented racing simulation". Overall score was 13%.
