= Bangers & Mash (video game) =

1992 video game

- Developer: Bizarre Developments
- Publisher: Alternative Software
- Platforms: Commodore 64, ZX Spectrum, Amstrad CPC
- Release: 1992
- Genre: Platform
- Mode: Single-player

Bangers & Mash is a 1992 video game developed by Bizarre Developments and published by Alternative Software in 1992 for the Commodore 64, ZX Spectrum, and Amstrad CPC. It is based on the Bangers and Mash children's cartoon series. The game received mixed reviews upon release.

== Gameplay ==
Players are tasked as Bangers to search the jungle for pieces of fruit to make a fruit pie, who has fallen down a tree trunk into the lair of the witch Mrs. Snitchnose. The objective of Bangers & Mash is to explore levels to locate the items of fruit, including apples, bananas and pears, the number of which is shown on an onscreen counter. When players have collected all the fruit in a level, they can progress to the next level by floating to the exit on a balloon. The game features two levels. Players must avoid creatures including hedgehogs, beetles, plants, skeletons, and ladybirds, and can attack them using mud pies, although ghosts cannot be attacked. Collecting colored flowers provide different effects: white flowers collect all fruit onscreen, purple flowers collect bonus points, blue flowers reverse the controls of players, and red flowers cause a game over. Players can also collect diamonds for extra points

== Critical reception ==
Reception

Review scores
Publication	Score
Amstrad Action	71%
Sinclair User	80%
Your Sinclair	70%
Zzap!64	53% / 52%

Sinclair User found Bangers & Mash "simple yet satisfying" for a budget title, enjoying the "colourful and well defined" visuals, although another reviewer expressed it "may not have as much lasting appeal amongst more mature players". Describing the game as "flawed", Amstrad Action critiqued the game for lacking variety, featuring minimal sound and effects, and only having two levels. Considering the game more appropriate for younger players, Your Sinclair lamented the absence of a multiplayer mode for two players, and expressed there was little to do to keep occupied. ZZap!64 found the game "frustrating" to play in its difficulty and faulted that there was little motivation to progress, describing the visuals as "horrid" and "bog standard".
