= Bangers and Mash (TV series) =

- Created by: Paul Groves; Edward McLachlan
- Written by: Paul Groves
- Directed by: Ian Sachs
- Narrated by: Jonathan Kydd
- Theme music composer: Chas & Dave
- Country of origin: United Kingdom
- Original language: English
- No. of series: 1
- No. of episodes: 25

Production
- Executive producer: Graham Clutterbuck
- Producer: Barrie Edwards
- Running time: 5 minutes
- Production companies: FilmFair; Central Independent Television

Original release
- Network: ITV (CITV)
- Release: 5 July – 1 September 1989

Bangers and Mash (often Bangers & Mash) is an English animated children's cartoon series originally broadcast on Children's ITV in 1989, and repeated until around 1993. The series consists of 25 five-minute episodes. A video game based on the show was published in 1992.

== Synopsis ==
Bangers and Mash were two troublemaking chimpanzees, and through wanting to have fun, caused grief for others, namely making a mess or breaking something of importance, normally belonging to their parents (or Gran, who also lived with them). Like all the inhabitants of their island, they lived in a house built on top of a tree (their address being No. 3 Tree Street).

Other characters of significance on the show include Bangers' and Mash's parents, their grandmother, their dog Mick, their friend Petal (who would often physically hurt them if their antics annoyed her too much), their teacher Mrs. Chum (who often resorted to the same punishment; making them write their ABC's ten times) and the local witch, Mrs. Snitchnose; a rat-like creature with a long nose with hairs coming on the end of it.

== Production history ==
The series revolves around the adventures of two chimpanzees, Bangers and Mash, and is based on a series of children's books by Paul Groves and Edward McLachlan. This series of reading books was used in schools in the 1980s. The series' narration and character voices were provided by Jonathan Kydd, and the incidental music and theme tune were written and performed by Chas & Dave. The series was also exported to New Zealand and Australia where it aired on Channel 2 and ABC respectively.

== Episodes ==
No.	Title	Original release date
1	"Eggs is Eggs"	5 July 1989
2	"Ghost Boast"	7 July 1989
3	"A Spell of Trouble"	10 July 1989
4	"What a Shower"	12 July 1989
5	"Caution! Chimps at Work"	14 July 1989
6	"Buzz Off"	17 July 1989
7	"Who Flew?"	19 July 1989
8	"Puddle Muddle"	21 July 1989
9	"Footprints in the Snow"	24 July 1989
10	"Chimperdale Farm"	26 July 1989
11	"ABC for Chimps"	28 July 1989
12	"Bovine Bovver"	31 July 1989
13	"Snitchnose Switch"	2 August 1989
14	"Phoney Postchimps"	4 August 1989
15	"Treat or Trick"	7 August 1989
16	"Can't Sew for Toffee"	9 August 1989
17	"Feat of Clay"	11 August 1989
18	"Miracle Cure"	14 August 1989
19	"Good Clean Fun"	16 August 1989
20	"A Snake in the Grass"	18 August 1989
21	"Dance Little Lady"	21 August 1989
22	"Arty Crafty"	23 August 1989
23	"Tour De Chimpton"	25 August 1989
24	"Wind Trouble"	30 August 1989
25	"Space Race"	1 September 1989

== Crew ==
- Created by Paul Groves & Edward McLachlan
- Narrated by Jonathan Kydd
- Music by Chas & Dave
- Directed by Ian Sachs
- Based on the books by Paul Groves
- Storyboard & Backgrounds: Edward McLachlan
- Layouts: John Riley-Cooper
- Animation: Geoff Loynes
- Paint & Trace Supervisor: Marie Turner
- Tracer: Alma Sachs
- Painters: Lynne Sachs & Jo Behit
- Checkers: Chris Lambrou & Steve Colwell
- Camera: Mo Simmons & Isabelle Perrichon
- Editor: Andi Sloss
- Assistant Editor: Jacqueline Munro
- Production Supervisor: Robert Dunbar
- Production Manager: Miles Foster
- Production Assistants: Simon Cox & Scott Heasmer
- Production Secretary: Nimet Murji
- Assistant Director: Barry Macey
- Producer: Barrie Edwards
- Executive Producer: Graham Clutterbuck to whom this series is dedicated.
- A FilmFair Production for Central Television
- © Longman Group UK Ltd/FilmFair Ltd 1989

== VHS releases ==
=== United Kingdom ===
VHS title	Release date	Episodes
Bangers & Mash – Eggs Is Eggs and 8 Other Stories (LPV 8502)	1989	Eggs is Eggs, What a Shower, Caution Chimps at Work, Buzz Off, Who Flew?, Puddle Muddle, Chimperdale Farm, Footprints in the Snow, Feat of Clay
Bangers & Mash – Ghost Boast and 7 Other Stories (LPV 8503)	1989	Ghost Boast, Spell of Trouble, ABC for Chimps, Bovine Bovver, Snitch Nose Switch, The Phoney Postchimps, Treat or Trick?, Can't Sew for Toffee
Bangers & Mash – Miracle Cure and 7 Other Stories (LPV 8504)	1990	Miracle Cure, Good Clean Fun, A Snake in the Grass, Dance Little Lady, Arty Crafty, Tour de Chimpton, Wind Trouble, Space Race
Bangers & Mash – Twelve Crazy Capers	20 September 1993	Eggs is Eggs, ABC for Chimps, Ghost Boast, Spell of Trouble, What a Shower, Caution Chimps at Work, Buzz Off, Who Flew?, Puddle Muddle, Chimperdale Farm, Bovine Bovver, Footprints in the Snow
Bangers & Mash – Twelve Hilarious Animated Adventures	20 September 1993	Snitch Nose Switch, The Phoney Postchimps, Treat or Trick?, Can't Sew for Toffee, Feat of Clay, Miracle Cure, Good Clean Fun, A Snake in the Grass, Dance Little Lady, Arty Crafty, Tour de Chimpton, Space Race
