= Dive bomb =

Dive bomb, dive-bomb or divebomb may refer to:

- Dive bomb (guitar technique)
- Divebomb, a Transformers character
- Dive bomber, bomber aircraft that dives towards its target
- Cannonball (diving)

== See also ==
- Dive bomber (disambiguation)
- Aerial bomb
