= Count Duckula 2 =

1992 video game

- Publisher: Alternative Software
- Series: Count Duckula
- Platforms: ZX Spectrum, Amstrad CPC
- Release: 1992
- Genre: Platform
- Mode: Single player

Count Duckula 2 is a computer game for the ZX Spectrum and Amstrad CPC released in 1992 by Alternative Software.

Critically, the game consistently achieved some of the lowest review scores of the 8-bit era and is considered one of the worst games published for these platforms.

It was the follow-up to the 1989 release Count Duckula in No Sax Please—We're Egyptian. Both are tie-in licenses of the Cosgrove Hall Count Duckula cartoon series.

== Gameplay ==
Count Duckula 2 is a platform game in which the player advances Duckula from screen to screen shooting soft toys with a ketchup gun.

== Reception ==
Sinclair User reviewed the game, awarding it 64%, concluding: "If you like silent, slow, basic, dated, unresponsive, annoying games, get it!" The Your Sinclair review was more scathing, awarding 9%: "The whole thing seems to play quite happily by itself, with the player being a sort of novelty bonus." The Amstrad CPC version fared no better, with Amstrad Action awarding the game a mere 3%. In the final issue of Your Sinclair, Count Duckula 2 was voted the "Worst Game Of All Time" by the magazine's readers.

The Amstrad CPC version of Count Duckula 2 is included in Stuart Ashen's 2015 book Terrible Old Games You've Probably Never Heard Of, in which he states that "Count Duckula 2 is one of the very worst examples of a lazy conversion. And as the game is distressingly poor in the first place, Alternative Software took something dreadful and made it into something frankly unholy." Ashen criticises Count Duckula 2's graphics, calling them "absolutely dreadful" and expresses that many of the sprites are difficult to parse due to being reduced to two colours without being redrawn.
