= Championship Baseball =

1986 video game

- Developer: Gamestar
- Publishers: WW: Activision; AU: Pactronics
- Platforms: Amiga, Amstrad CPC, Apple II, Atari ST, Commodore 64, MS-DOS, ZX Spectrum
- Release: 1986
- Genre: Sports
- Modes: Single-player; Multiplayer

Championship Baseball is a sports video game developed by Activision's Gamestar division in 1986.

== Gameplay ==
Championship Baseball is a baseball simulation with a split-screen to give the player a first-person view for both pitching and playing defense.

In addition to exhibition matches and batting practice, the game features a 24-team league divided into four divisions. Players can create and name their own teams, as well as select players with different attributes. Fielders are rated for batting, catching, running and throwing, while pitchers are rated for speed, control and stamina.

The game uses a split-screen display to show an overhead view of the baseball field, in addition to a close-up view of the pitcher and batter from the catcher's point of view. When the ball is hit, the field view expands to fill the screen. Players control pitching, batting, fielding and baserunning, including actions such as bunting and stealing bases.

In league mode, players compete against five teams within their division to qualify for the playoffs. The playoffs are decided in a best-of-three championship series.

== Development ==
The game is an expanded version of Gamestar's earlier Star League Baseball, introducing additional features including a split-screen presentation.

== Reception ==
Computer Gaming World stated that Championship Baseball was a worthy sequel to Gamestar's Star League Baseball. In 1988, Dragon gave the game 3½ out of 5 stars.

Reviewing the Apple II version for inCider, Dan Muse praised the team-building features. He found the gameplay enjoyable, but he felt that scoring against the computer was considerably easier than in HardBall!.

Ahoy! praised the Amiga version's animated graphics, accessible controls, documentation and replayability, describing the game as an entertaining combination of action and strategy.

Roger Abram of Current Notes was highly critical of the Atari ST version. Abram strong highlighted the games weak computer opponent. He reported winning by a score of 54–3 by the sixth inning of his second game and argued that individual player ratings had little noticeable effect on performance. Although he acknowledged the game's expanded features, Abram considered it less enjoyable than Gamestar's earlier Atari 8-bit baseball game, suggesting that multiplayer matches might be more entertaining.
