= Advanced Lawnmower Simulator =

1988 video game

- Developer: Duncan Macdonald
- Publisher: Your Sinclair
- Platforms: ZX Spectrum, Amstrad CPC, Amiga
- Release: 1988
- Genre: Simulation
- Mode: Single-player

Advanced Lawnmower Simulator is a video game for the ZX Spectrum published as an April Fools' Day joke by Your Sinclair magazine in 1988. The player is tasked with mowing lawns with a lawn mower in exchange for rewards. The magazine claimed the game was developed and published by "Gardensoft" and also published a joke review lauding it and released the game on a cover tape. It was not officially labelled as a prank until August 1990. The concept has inspired other games with similar titles.

== Gameplay ==
A game in progress

The player is presented with a choice of six lawnmowers, five of which are inoperative and cannot be used. Once the only operative lawnmower has been picked, the player then uses it to mow a lawn. There is only one key ("M"), and pressing it mows one square of lawn. After a lawn is completely mowed, the player is rewarded if it was done well enough. All lawns are identical.

After a few lawns have been mowed, the player gets killed automatically (according to Your Sinclair, the mower "hits a rock and blows up") and the game starts again.

== Development and release ==
Advanced Lawnmower Simulator was first conceived as a prank in the April 1988 issue of Your Sinclair. The piece claimed the player takes on the role of a Youth Training Scheme junior gardener with a lawnmower, a small toolbox and a can of petrol, and would be able to upgrade their equipment, including additional tools, more cans of petrol and more powerful "grassware". It also claimed that lawns get larger as the game progresses, have hidden traps such as stones, coat-hangers and duck-ponds, and later levels would be rose gardens. The supposed developer and publisher Gardensoft were introduced as "a brand new publishing house that looks set to carve quite a niche for itself in the simulations market", and the piece claimed that they were going to release more games in the coming months, including a spring-cleaning game, a washing-up simulator (including a drying-up simulator) and a laundrette simulator in which players supposedly have to clean bags of various colours and materials. It was also stated that Advanced Lawnmower Simulator is "ACE!" and a "Guaranteed number one!", and would cost £14.95. It was also awarded a nine out of ten and given the magazine's MEGAGAME accolade. An advertisement, which described the game as "The most advanced domestic chore simulation yet to hit the home micro!" and claimed a release date of 1st April and that it would be available for purchase in garden centres, appeared in the same issue. The game was coded by Your Sinclair writer Duncan Macdonald, and released on a cover tape in the next issue. The game parodied Codemasters' habit of including the word "simulator" in its game titles.

Your Sinclair revealed the review and game to be an April Fools' joke in August 1990 (after a series of letters about the game were supposedly posted to the magazine). The issue also claimed (with screenshots) there are three sequels to the game: one written by Rodney Sproston in which "alien grass has invaded the moon", Advanced Lawenmower Simulator III, in which the player inadvertently enters a nightmare whose only escape from is by mowing through a "dream hole", and ALS Part Four - The Revenge Of Mow, in which the player has to collect money after it falls out of their pocket after purchasing a new mower. The piece finished with the words "Utter crap".

== Reception ==
In 2008, Retro Gamer jokingly stated that Advanced Lawnmower Simulator "has been hailed as THE best game on the Spectrum", and made jocular judgements on the gameplay and graphics as "Outstanding" and "Excellent" respectively, and of the game as "a truly special experience".

Advanced Lawnmower Simulator appears on an IGN list of "Video Games You Won't Believe Somebody Made", and a Geek.com list of "Weirdest Simulation Games of All Time". Vice described the prank as "one of the strangest incidents in mainstream publishing".

== Legacy ==
Advanced Lawnmower Simulator has received a cult following and multiple remakes. The game inspired other tongue-in-cheek games with "simulator" in the title. It has been ported to the Amstrad CPC and Amiga.

== See also ==
- Hover Bovver
