= Rigel's Revenge =

1987 video game

- Developer: Smart Egg Software
- Publisher: Mastertronic
- Designer: Ron Harris
- Programmers: Nigel Brooks; Said Hassan
- Platforms: Amstrad CPC, Commodore 64, ZX Spectrum
- Release: 1987
- Genre: Interactive fiction
- Mode: Single-player

Rigel's Revenge is a text adventure published in 1987 for the Amstrad CPC, Commodore 64, and ZX Spectrum home computers by Mastertronic on their "Bulldog" label. It was written by British studio Smart Egg Software using a heavily modified version of The Quill, an adventure-authoring package.

== Plot ==
Harper and Elliot, two 23rd-century investigative journalists, have joined an organisation called the Alterian Corps in order to further their careers. They have been sent on a mission to the planet Rigel V which is in a state of war with one region holding out against the Federation troops attempting to conquer it. The Rigellians claim to possess a Doomsday Machine which will enact a terrible revenge if the Federation refuse to withdraw from the planet. Elliot has been smuggled in by the Alterian Corps in the guise of a Rigellian trooper with a mission to locate the whereabouts of the Doomsday Machine and report to Harper who is to follow one week later. Harper has instructions to meet Elliot at night in a certain backstreet in the occupied sector of the town.

== Gameplay ==
The player takes control of Harper. The parser accepts standard text adventure commands and can understand simple sentences such as THROW RUBBLE AT THE TANK and LOOK INSIDE THE SATCHEL. The game's interaction with the player is mainly through text output, but occasionally during the game static graphics are displayed.

== Reception ==
Reception

Review scores
Publication	Score
Crash	88%
Sinclair User	3/10
Your Sinclair	8/10
Zzap!64	75%

Award
Publication	Award
C+VG	Hit
