= Alex Higgins' World Snooker =

1985 video game

- Developers: Gem Software (CPC); Lindensoft (DOS)
- Publishers: Amsoft (CPC); Amstrad (DOS)
- Platforms: Amstrad CPC, MS-DOS
- Release: EU: 1985 (CPC); EU: 1986 (DOS)
- Genre: Sports
- Modes: Single-player, multiplayer

Alex Higgins' World Snooker is a 1985 sports video game developed by Gem Software and published by Amsoft for the Amstrad CPC. The game is named after Northern Irish two-time world champion Alex Higgins. An MS-DOS port was released in 1986. It was the first game specifically made for EGA.

== Gameplay ==
The game simulates the cue sport snooker. The game has a single-player practice mode and a two-player mode. The player aims at the ball with a circular cursor and then determines the strength and spin of the shot. The balls can be numbered if the player has a monochrome screen or is unfamiliar with snooker rules. The game can be played with 6 or 10 red balls instead of the full 15.

== Reception ==
Reception

Review scores
Publication	Score
Amstrad Action	54%
Amtix	41%
CPC464 User	5/5
Amstrad Magazine	4/5

CPC464 User called it one of the best games on the system. Amstrad Action said the game isn't as good as Steve Davis Snooker. Amtix described the ball graphics as poor and summarized the game: "Generally a reasonable snooker game but Steve Davis' Snooker presents much better value for money."

== Related title ==
Another cue sports game by the same developer and publisher, Alex Higgins' World Pool, was released also in 1985 for the Amstrad CPC. Amstrad Action and Amtix gave the game scores of 51% and 39% respectively.
