= Battle of the Planets (video game) =

1986 video game

- Developer: Mikro-Gen
- Publisher: Mikro-Gen
- Platforms: Amstrad CPC, Commodore 64, ZX Spectrum
- Release: 1986
- Genre: Action
- Mode: Single-player

Battle of the Planets is a video game based on the television series Battle of the Planets.

== Release ==
The game was published in 1986 by Mikro-Gen for various home computer systems, including the Amstrad CPC, Commodore 64 and ZX Spectrum.

== Reception ==
Amstrad Computer User praised the game, calling it "a good enjoyable blast with some amazingly smooth and fast graphics, and enough plot to keep you occupied but not snowed under with complexity".

Amstrad Action complimented the "stunning vector graphics" but bemoaned the "pitiful lack of helpful instructions", while deriding it for having "very little relevance to its origin" and being "basically just a shoot-em-up".

Amtix rated the game at 77% and called it "quite a good game" overall.

Computer and Video Games described it as "a mixture of Elite and 3D Tank Battle".
