= Xeno (video game) =

1986 video game

- Amstrad cover (Budget Re-release)
- Developer: Binary Design Ltd.
- Publisher: A'n'F Software
- Platforms: ZX Spectrum, Amstrad CPC, Commodore 64
- Release: 1986
- Genre: Action
- Mode: Multiplayer

Xeno is a 1986 video game for the ZX Spectrum, Amstrad CPC and Commodore 64 in which players take turns attempting to knock a ball between two goal posts.
