= Turbo the Tortoise =

1992 video game

- Commodore 64 cover
- Developer: Visual Impact
- Publishers: Hi-Tec Software; Codemasters
- Artists: Jarrod Bentley; Dennis Mulliner
- Composer: Gerard Gourley
- Platforms: ZX Spectrum, Amstrad CPC, Commodore 64
- Release: 1992
- Genre: Platform
- Mode: Single-player

Turbo the Tortoise is a platform game published in 1992 by Hi-Tec Software, developed by Visual Impact for the ZX Spectrum, Amstrad CPC and Commodore 64.

== Plot ==
Turbo (initially named Wal) is a pet tortoise of a scientist named Dr. Mulliner, which one day hibernates inside his "Matter doesn't Matter" chamber. Dr. Mulliner and his assistant Beckett, unaware of this fact, decide to start the generators to make way for his latest experiment on cybernetic technology. While the experiment itself is a disaster and part of the equipment is damaged due to the presence of the tortoise on the chamber, this grants Turbo "Super Tortoise Powers". Since the experiment cannot be restarted due to lack of supplies, Dr. Mulliner assigns Turbo the task of finding and retrieving the six vital components for his experiment which are scattered in six different time periods.

== Reception ==
Reception

Review scores
Publication	Score
Sinclair User	85%
Your Sinclair	94%
Zzap!64	81%

Award
Publication	Award
Your Sinclair	YS Megagame

Turbo the Tortoise was received highly positive reviews from several publications of its time.

Your Sinclair magazine gave it a 94% and a "YS Megagame" award of recognition, stating, "Turbo the Tortoise is a superb game. It's thoroughly playable and wonderfully varied. The gameplay is spot-on, the villains tough and the jumping pulse quickening."

Sinclair User magazine's reviewer Paul Rand gave it 85%, saying, "It's addictive, enjoyable, challenging, and reasonably cute though."

A Zzap!64 review by Phil King awarded it 81%, saying, "Packed with action, Turbo's certainly not at all lethargic, and you won't want to put it back in its box till you've completed it."
