= Cronosoft =

UK software company

- Type: Private
- Industry: Video games
- Founded: 2002; 24 years ago
- Founder: Simon Ullyatt
- Website: cronsoft.fwscart.com

Cronosoft is a UK-based non-profit software publisher established in 2002 by Simon Ullyatt. The company manufactures and markets games and utility software for a range of mainly 8-bit computers that are considered "retro" or commercially obsolete.

Cronosoft's plan was to produce games on real media (usually cassette tape) and market them via their website, and through user enthusiast groups.

== History ==
Cronosoft was formed in late 2002 as a result of little software being released for older 8-bit computers. The last major commercial releases and magazine support for systems such as the ZX Spectrum and Commodore 64 ceasing around 1993.

Its first release, Egghead in Space (the third Egghead game in the series, the first in the series being published by Crash magazine in the UK), was written and developed by Jonathan Cauldwell, and released on cassette format for the ZX Spectrum in 2003

Since the beginning, Cronosoft has increased its range of software to include titles, not only for the ZX Spectrum, but also for the Commodore 64, VIC-20, Amstrad CPC, ZX81, ZX80, Dragon 32, and even the Mattel Aquarius. Popular titles include Platform Game Designer, Astro Nell, Quantum Gardening, Glove, LumASCII and Code Zero. More recent releases have included Quadron by Cosmium, and Sokobaarn, popular but very different games for the ZX Spectrum.

Cronosoft's plan is to expand its range to cover even more obscure home computers like the TRS-80 Color Computer, Oric 1, Sord M5, and TI-99/4A. Of the 100+ titles released as of 2020, more than half are for the ZX Spectrum, ZX80, and ZX81. The next most popular format is the VIC-20.

Cronosoft has been featured in several mainstream computer magazines, including Retro Gamer, GamesTM and Micro Mart. The company exhibits at computer shows across the United Kingdom; in the past, this included CGE UK, ORSAM and RETRO BALL. Cronosoft has been referenced by the BBC, The Guardian, The Independent, and has been featured in the movie Memoirs of a Spectrum Addict.
