= The Secret of Bastow Manor =

1983 video game

- C64 cover art
- Publishers: SoftGold; Dotsoft (SC-3000)
- Designer: Darryl Reynolds
- Platforms: VIC-20, Commodore 64, SC-3000, Amstrad CPC
- Release: 1983: C64, VIC-20; 1984: SC-3000, Amstrad CPC
- Genre: Adventure
- Mode: Single-player

The Secret of Bastow Manor is a 1983 graphic adventure game for the VIC-20 and Commodore 64 published by SoftGold in 1983. The Commodore 64 version is formally titled The Secret of Bastow Manor 64.

Opening puzzle, entering the manor

The graphics use PETSCII characters and the game is written in BASIC.
