= Rollaround =

1987 video game

- Developer: Mr. Chip Software
- Publisher: Mastertronic
- Platforms: Commodore 64, ZX Spectrum, Amstrad CPC
- Release: 1987: C64; 1988: Spectrum, CPC
- Genre: Puzzle
- Mode: Single-player

Rollaround is an isometric 3D puzzle video game published by Mastertronic in 1987 for the Commodore 64 and 1988 for the ZX Spectrum and Amstrad CPC. The game is a combination of Marble Madness and Q*bert, with the player controlling a ball on a map made up of tiles which change pattern or colour when touched. A level is completed when a specific number of tiles have been changed in this way.

== Gameplay ==
The player controls a ball which can move in the four cardinal directions and also jump. Jumping is necessary to traverse gaps between tiles and evade enemies.

There are six kinds of target tile (shown at top of screen) but not all of them feature in every level. There is a quota for the exact number of tiles of each type that must be touched; if this is exceeded the level cannot be completed. Certain tiles operate as switches; touching them will change the arrangement of tiles on the screen. Certain exits are only revealed when the nearest tile is touched.

Various enemies will try to kill the player; they must be evaded or jumped over. Falling off the map is also fatal. There is also a time limit.

== Reviews ==
Sinclair User: "If leaping over fast-moving aliens, collecting squares and avoiding big holes are things you don't do well in real life, then you won't get far with Rollaround."
