= Legend of the Amazon Women =

1986 video game

- Developer: SilverTime
- Publishers: U.S. Gold; Mastertronic; Erbe Software, S.A. DROsoft; Aackosoft
- Designer: Simon Ffinch
- Programmer: Daniel Lucas
- Composer: John A. Fitzpatrick
- Platforms: Commodore 64, ZX Spectrum
- Release: 1986
- Genre: Beat 'em up
- Mode: Single-player

Legend of the Amazon Women is a beat 'em up video game developed by SilverTime and published by U.S. Gold and Mastertronic for the Commodore 64, and ZX Spectrum in 1986.

== Plot ==
Stranded in the middle of the jungle after a plane crash, your child has been stolen by a tribe of Amazon Warriors, who want to raise her as one of their own. You must fight your way through the jungle Past Amazons armed with clubs, swords, axes and arrows, in order to rescue your daughter.

Your goal is to fight your way through ten zones and rescue the stolen child. The Amazons attempt to stop you, fighting one at a time while continuously firing arrows that must be avoided by jumping or ducking. As the game progresses, the Amazons become more intelligent and increasingly difficult to defeat.

You have a limited time to complete each zone, if you fail to reach the end of the zone before your time runs out you lose a life.

== See also ==
- Flight of the Amazon Queen
