= Mindtrap =

1989 video game

- Publisher: Mastertronic
- Designers: Predrag Beciric; Anđela Tomic; David Selakovic; Aleksandar Petrovic; Vojislav Mihajlovic; Predrag Milicevic
- Programmers: Commodore 64; Andjela Tomic
- Platforms: Amstrad CPC, Commodore 64, ZX Spectrum
- Release: 1989
- Genre: Puzzle
- Mode: Single-player

Mindtrap is a puzzle video game for the ZX Spectrum released in 1989 by Mastertronic. Ports followed for the Commodore 64 and the Amstrad CPC. With 999,999 levels, the object is to rearrange grids of coloured dice so that they are all aligned, before running out of time or available moves.

== Gameplay ==
Each screen (called a floor), has a set of dice of different colours (blue, red, magenta, green, cyan and white). The player shuffles the dice around the play area, using a frame surrounding 4 of the dice at a time. Dice within this frame can be rotated 90° around a central axis, with the ultimate aim of lining up the dice in the correct colour before the time and move limit expired.

Later levels introduce a third dimension of the dice scattered between 2 and 5 floors. Players then have to rearrange the dice both on the floor they are on and between the floors to finish the level. The number of moves and time allowed increase with the subsequent number of floors. Some areas of the floor are blocked off to the frame, so different routes are needed to move the dice.

The game creates a 32-digit alphanumeric password after successful completion of a level, which is tied to the player name, to allow later resumption.
