= Super Trolley =

1988 video game

- Developer: Icon Design
- Publisher: Mastertronic
- Platforms: Amstrad CPC, ZX Spectrum Commodore 64
- Release: 1988
- Genre: Action

Super Trolley, is a 1988 video game produced by Icon Design where the player takes control of a supermarket employee. It was created as a tie-in with the BBC show Jim'll Fix It.

== Gameplay ==
Players control a supermarket worker who is tasked with stocking the supermarket shelves, finding lost babies and removing dogs from the store. The objective of the game is to successfully complete each day's tasks from Monday through to Saturday, the latter being the busiest day of the week, without being sacked. As this is accomplished the player's character is promoted, eventually becoming the store manager and sacking his former employer.

Before shelves can be filled the player must price each item in the warehouse, which involves attaching labels to goods.

== Development ==
The game was developed after a wish by Andrew Collett was sent to the BBC's television programme, Jim'll Fix It. The inlay card artwork depicts a cartoon of the show's presenter Jimmy Savile pushing a shopping trolley. The programme was broadcast on Saturday 12 March 1988 with the game published two weeks later.

== Reception ==
Reception

Review scores
Publication	Score
Crash	54%
Computer and Video Games	21/40
