= Les Pyramides d'Atlantys =

1986 adventure video game

- Developer(s): Luc Thibaud
- Publisher(s): Microids
- Platform(s): Amstrad CPC
- Release: 1986

Les Pyramides d'Atlantys is a submarine adventure game for the Amstrad CPC. It was published by Microids in 1986, authored by Luc Thibaud.
