= 750cc Grand Prix =

1989 video game

- Developer: WASP
- Publisher: Codemasters
- Platforms: ZX Spectrum, Amstrad CPC
- Release: 1989
- Genre: Racing
- Mode: Single-player

750cc Grand Prix is a video game originally developed by Ken Murfitt of Scope Soft and published by Codemasters in 1989 for the Amstrad CPC. It was later ported for ZX Spectrum in 1991 by WASP (Lyndon Sharp, Chris Graham and Damon Redmond).

== Gameplay ==
Screenshot of gameplay

750cc Grand Prix is an arcade-style racing game with the theme of Grand Prix motorcycle racing. There are six British tracks, including Silverstone, Thruxton and Brands Hatch. The player must finish in the top three in each race to progress, competing against up to seven other computer-controlled riders.

== Development ==
Programmer Lyndon Sharp got the idea for 750cc Grand Prix after riding pillion on Codemasters' spokesman Mike Clarke's motorcycle.

== Reception ==
CRASH magazine reviewed 750cc Grand Prix in March 1991, awarding 72%. The main criticism was with the starting-line acceleration of the computer-controlled opponents – unfairly quick compared the player's motorcycle. The review also highlighted the screen-tilting feature, in which the graphical display tilts when the player's motorcycle banks around bends.
