= Terminus (1986 video game) =

1986 video game

- Developer: Mastertronic
- Publisher: Mastertronic
- Platforms: ZX Spectrum, MSX, Amstrad CPC
- Release: 1986
- Genre: Platform

Terminus, also known as Terminus: The Prison Planet or Terminus: Prison Planet, is a platform game by Mastertronic released in 1986 for the ZX Spectrum, MSX, and Amstrad CPC. The game is set inside a futuristic prison consisting of 512 screens. The purpose is to release Brain, the leader of a teenage gang called The Wanglers.

== Gameplay ==
The player controls one of four characters: Mobod and Xann who move by flying, Spex who moves around by bouncing, and Magno who uses "reverse gravity" to cling to roofs. The player can change characters by using one of the transports hidden around the prison and must unlock sections of the prison by using teleports. The player must also avoid traps which include lava pools, needle beams, creatures, compressor rooms (activated by touching wall sensors) as well as the numerous guards. Energy can be restored by using recharge units located around the prison complex.
