= Yes, Prime Minister (video game) =

1987 video game

- Developer: Oxford Digital Enterprises
- Publisher: Mosaic Publishing
- Platforms: Amstrad CPC; BBC Micro; Commodore 64; MS-DOS; ZX Spectrum
- Release: EU: October 1987
- Genre: Adventure
- Mode: Single-player

Yes, Prime Minister is an adventure game based on the television series of the same name. It was developed by Oxford Digital Enterprises and published in 1987 by Mosaic Publishing. It was released in Europe for Amstrad CPC, BBC Micro, Commodore 64, MS-DOS, and ZX Spectrum. Critics found it a faithful adaptation of the television series, but remarked on its high price, short length, and lack of long-term appeal.

== Gameplay ==
Yes, Prime Minister is based on the television series of the same name, and it plays like a text adventure. Playing as British prime minister Jim Hacker, the player starts out with a 50 percent approval rating and must work over a five-day period to improve the poll number. The player is aided by Hacker's secretaries, Humphrey Appleby and Bernard Woolley. The game is played through conversations between Hacker and other characters, such as Humphrey and Bernard, with the player continually selecting responses from a list of dialogue options. The outcome of the storyline can vary depending on the response that has been selected.

Gameplay takes place in Hacker's office, which includes various items such as an intercom, a telex machine, and two telephones. The player must answer a telephone when it rings and must also keep track of the time to avoid missing appointments with government officials. Scheduled meetings are written down in Hacker's diary. Other duties including reading memos that occasionally come in to Hacker's office. Poll numbers are accessible in a safe hidden behind a Union Jack flag.

== Development and release ==
In September 1985, it was announced that Mosaic Publishing had secured the rights to publish a computer game based on the television program Yes Minister. The game had been programmed by the Ram Jam Corporation, and was scheduled for release in November 1985. It was announced a week later that the game would instead be released in March 1986, to coincide with the release of Yes, Prime Minister. Around early 1986, the game was shelved. In mid-1987, it was announced that Mosaic Publishing would still publish the game, now titled Yes, Prime Minister and developed by Oxford Digital Enterprises (ODE). Show writer Antony Jay provided his input on the game.

The game was released in Europe in October 1987, coinciding with the release of the show's second series. It was published for Amstrad CPC, BBC Micro, Commodore 64, and ZX Spectrum. A DOS version followed in November 1987. Each version plays the same with only minor graphical differences. The game received a budget re-release in 1990, published by Mastertronic Plus for the Amstrad CPC, C64, and ZX Spectrum.

== Reception ==
Reception

Review scores
Publication	Score
ACE	595/1000
Crash	56% (ZX Spectrum)
Computer and Video Games	86% (CPC/C64/ZX Spectrum re-release)
Sinclair User	8/10 (ZX Spectrum)
Your Sinclair	9/10 (ZX Spectrum); 89/100 (ZX Spectrum re-release)
Zzap!64	38% (C64); 58% (C64 re-release)
Australian Commodore Review	95/100 (C64)
Commodore Computing International	7/10 (C64)
Commodore Format	47% (C64 re-release)
YC	2/5 (C64 re-release)

Award
Publication	Award
Your Sinclair	YS Megagame

Yes, Prime Minister was praised as a faithful adaptation of the television series. Keith Campbell of Computer and Video Games wrote that the game is based so closely on the series that the result "is quite astonishing, and very entertaining." Campbell called the dialogue "impeccably written" and stated that Humphrey and Bernard's interaction with the player "is extremely well implemented, and conveys the mood of the TV series and the facets of the characters in it more closely than any other game I have seen." ACE called the dialogue "really very witty in parts and every bit as good as the TV series." Commodore User wrote that the game has "a style of script virtually undistinguishable from those on TV," making the game "a must" for fans of the series. Your Computer wrote that the storylines "feel like they could have been lifted from the TV series.

However, critics found the game too short, with little or no lasting appeal beyond the first round of play. ACE called the game "one of the biggest missed opportunities of the year." The magazine wrote that despite the possible scenarios, the game's variety "steadily grows stale, and the bulk of the game becomes depressingly familiar." ACE further wrote, "What you end up with is an initially enjoyable game, that turns out to be a disappointment." The Guardian wrote that while the game "certainly has something of the feel" of the television show, it "inevitably becomes repetitive." The Guardian concluded, "At least when you settle down to watch the television series, you know the storyline will be different each time!" Other reviewers praised the game's variety.

Some reviewers compared the game to Mosaic's earlier Adrian Mole game, with Sinclair User calling Yes, Prime Minister a superior choice. Sinclair User, reviewing the ZX Spectrum version, opined that the digitised character images were poor, although they were praised by other critics reviewing the C64 version.

Critics found the game's initial release to be overpriced at £14.95. Some reviewers felt that the budget re-release was appropriately priced at £2.99, with Zzap!64 writing that the "repetitiveness is more acceptable and the satirical humour is very amusing – at least for the first few goes." Commodore Format wrote that there is no incentive to play the game a second time "because the scenario remains almost exactly the same," stating that "because of the conversational nature of the game, a second play through can prove tedious." YC, also reviewing the re-release, opined that the game was showing its age and that it would only appeal to fans of the series, while writing that it was a good value and worthwhile purchase for any fan.
