= Top Fuel Eliminator =

1987 video game

- Developer: Gamestar
- Publisher: Gamestar
- Platforms: Apple II, Commodore 64
- Release: 1987

Top Fuel Eliminator is a 1987 video game published by Gamestar.

== Gameplay ==
Top Fuel Eliminator is a game in which the track conditions in the game involve variables such as surface and air temperature, humidity, elevation, and traction.

== Reception ==
David M. Wilson and Johnny L. Wilson reviewed Shirley Muldowney's Top Fuel Challenge with Top Fuel Eliminator for Computer Gaming World, and stated that "Of the two games, one must - note that TFE is more user-friendly. Whereas TFC simply notes the player's failures, TFE offers a full-scale evaluation of every qualifying run."
