= Streaker (video game) =

1987 video game

- Developer: Bulldog
- Publisher: Bulldog (Mastertronic)
- Designer: Geoff Calder
- Platforms: ZX Spectrum, Amstrad CPC, MSX
- Release: 1987
- Genre: Action
- Mode: Single-player

Streaker is an action game published by Mastertronic on their "Bulldog" label in 1987. The game was released for the Amstrad CPC, MSX, ZX Spectrum.

== Plot ==
The hero of the game is Carlin, a naked man who has been mugged and stripped, and needs to find all of his clothes. Carlin is in a town on the planet Zuggi, which resembles a town in Earth in many ways, with locations including an hotel, a cafe, a supermarket and a chemist's shop. As Streaker finds more clothes, he is able to enter more and more locations. The game is won when he is fully dressed.

== Gameplay ==
Screenshot

Gameplay is controlled through a nested menu system, as in Mastertronic's Spellbound. There are a multitude of items in the game, many of which can be used and some of which seem to have no purpose. Streaker can pick up keys to open doors, eat food items to raise his hunger levels, and needs to solve a number of simple puzzles.

While most aspects of life on Zuggi are very similar to Earth, there are a number of fantastic elements in the world. For example, Streaker may teleport ("beam transfer") by using a number of different coloured beamers. These will teleport Streaker to the location of the corresponding beampad. These beampads can be moved by Streaker and are a good way to avoid thieves. Nice touches include Streaker's ability to advance time by acquiring a stopwatch (the game is played in real time, and you often need to wait for a particular location to open) and the "Save" and "Load" options appearing after Streaker picks up a Tape Recorder.

Streaker's quest is made more difficult by the presence of a number of thieves. They will steal Streaker's clothes on contact, or cause him to lose a life if he is naked. The clothes may be regained from the thieves by finding and offering the thief an item that he wants.
