= Dive Bomber (video game) =

1988 video game

- Developer: Acme Animation
- Publishers: U.S. Gold; Gremlin Graphics
- Platforms: Commodore 64, Amstrad CPC, Atari ST, MS-DOS, ZX Spectrum
- Release: 1988
- Genre: Combat flight simulator
- Mode: Single-player

Dive Bomber (known as Night Raider in Europe) is a video game developed by Acme Animation in 1988 for the Commodore 64. It was ported to Atari ST, Apple II, ZX Spectrum and MS-DOS.

== Plot ==
Dive Bomber is a game in which the player flies a Grumman Avenger while searching for the German battleship Bismarck. The player first must learn to fly the plane before going on a mission. The player takes off from and lands on the aircraft carrier Ark Royal. The player selects one of four missions by drawing straws in the opening sequence of the game.

== Gameplay ==
Dive Bomber has digitized sound. The player uses a mouse with the Atari ST and Amiga versions for menu selections and when flying the aircraft. The game makes use of several screens. The player uses the Pilot's Screen when flying, using controls including the brake, vertical speed, artificial horizon, and torpedo release. The player uses the Engineer's Screen to choose fuel tanks and the fuel mixture as well as control the throttle. The player uses the Navigator's Screen to view an area map displaying where enemy aircraft and ships are located. The player uses the Tail Gunner's Screen to see behind the plane and use the machine guns against enemy aircraft attacking from the rear. Tips for flying the Avenger can be found in the player's manual.

== Reception ==
The game was reviewed in 1989 in Dragon #141 by Hartley, Patricia, and Kirk Lesser in "The Role of Computers" column. The reviewers gave the game 4½ out of 5 stars. 1991 and 1993 Computer Gaming World surveys of strategy and war games gave it one half star out of five, criticizing "mediocre graphics, documentation and an overall lack of panache".
