= Starbowl Football =

1982 video game

- Publisher: Gamestar
- Platform: Atari 8-bit
- Release: 1982
- Genre: Sports

Starbowl Football is an American football video game published in 1982 by Gamestar for Atari 8-bit computers. An earlier version of the game was sold by Arcade Plus as Arcade Pro Football.

== Gameplay ==
Starbowl Football is a game in which four pass plays and three running plays are offered to make a choice of nearly 200 combinations of plays.

== Reception ==
Bob DeWitt reviewed the game for Computer Gaming World, and stated that "I would recommend this game to anyone with a friend who is looking for an excuse not to have to clean the garage next weekend."
