= The Young Ones (video game) =

1986 video game

- ZX Spectrum cassette cover art
- Developer: Orpheus
- Platforms: Amstrad CPC, Commodore 64, ZX Spectrum
- Release: 1986
- Mode: Single-player

The Young Ones is a video game based on the British comedy television series The Young Ones. The game was published in 1986 by Orpheus Software, based in Hatley St George in Bedfordshire, UK, for the Amstrad CPC, Commodore 64, and ZX Spectrum.

== Gameplay ==
Commodore 64 screenshot

The game takes place in the students' home. The player can opt to play as either Vyvyan, Rick, Neil or Mike to explore the house and enter different rooms. The other characters become computer-controlled players. All characters can move around the house, pick up and drop objects, as well as break and fix things. The characters often talk, giving the player clues as to what the character is intended to do.

The aim of the game is to try and move out of the house with all the character's belongings in the shortest time possible. This is not so easy because these possessions are usually not in their preferred condition, or are hidden around the house, and players need various tools to get to them. The other characters will move around the house, behaving in-character, occasionally moving around or further damaging the possessions – making the task harder.

== Production ==
The concept of the game was created by Orpheus director Paul Kaufman (previously director of Oric software house, Tansoft). The majority of the game was programmed by John Marshall, with input from Geoff Phillips. The characters of The Young Ones were licensed from the owners of the BBC television series, Ben Elton, Rik Mayall, and Lise Mayer.

Due to difficulty in licensing the original series music from the BBC, an alternative music soundtrack was commissioned to sound similar to the original theme. Over 10,000 copies of the game were sold, mainly through Boots, Woolworths and independent computer shops.

== Reception ==
Reception

Review scores
Publication	Score
Crash	42%
Computer and Video Games	13/40
Sinclair User	3/5
Your Sinclair	7/10

In a review of the game, British computer magazine Your Sinclair said that fans of the series would probably enjoy the game, but others could tire of it quickly. It was given a 7/10 rating.
