= Konami's Ping Pong =

1985 video game

- Arcade flyer
- Developer: Konami
- Publishers: Konami; Nintendo (FDS)
- Platforms: Arcade, Amstrad CPC, Commodore 64, Famicom Disk System, MSX, ZX Spectrum
- Release: Arcade: JP: May 1985; MSX: JP: 1985; Famicom Disk System: JP: May 30, 1987
- Genre: Sports
- Modes: Single-player, multiplayer

Konami's Ping Pong (Note: Japanese: コナミのピンポン, Hepburn: Konami no Pinpon) is a 1985 sports video game developed and published by Konami for arcades. It is the first video game to accurately reflect the gameplay of table tennis, as opposed to earlier simplifications like Pong. It was released in Japan in May 1985. It was ported to the Amstrad CPC, Commodore 64, Famicom Disk System, MSX, and ZX Spectrum.

== Gameplay ==
Arcade screenshot

Konami's Ping Pong can be played singleplayer or multiplayer, using 11 point scoring rules; the first player to attain a score of 11 or higher, leading by two points, wins the game (to a maximum of 14-14, at which moment the next point wins). The player must win the best of two out of three games in order to win the match. The playfield is shown from an isometric perspective with the players displayed as disembodied hands; players placed on the far-side of the table will find hitting the ball is much more difficult, but the player is always positioned on the near side during the single player mode. All the essential moves are represented: forehand, backhand, lob, and smash.

The game includes the penguin protagonist from Konami's earlier title Antarctic Adventure on the title screen and as a member of the audience in the game. This penguin would be later be known as Penta. In the introductory animation, a pingpong ball bounces along the table, and finally hits Penta on the head, who appears to faint.

== Reception ==
Reception

Award
Publication	Award
Crash	Smash!

In Japan, Game Machine listed Konami's Ping Pong on their September 1, 1985 issue as being the nineteenth most-successful table arcade unit of the month.

== Ports ==
In 1985, the game was released by Konami for MSX computers and in 1986, the game was ported to the Amstrad CPC, Commodore 64 and ZX Spectrum by Imagine Software and Doug Burns (credited in game to the pseudonym Bernie Duggs), under the name Ping Pong. Apart from scaled-down graphics and sound due to limited system capabilities, the ports perfectly replicate the arcade gameplay.

In 1987, the game was ported to the Famicom Disk System as Smash Ping Pong and published by Nintendo. Nintendo's character Donkey Kong Jr. replaces Konami's Penta in the crowd. Diskun, a Famicom Disk System Mascot, also replaces Pentarou in a title screen.

== Legacy ==
The game was re-released on the Wii Virtual Console in Japan and the PAL region (the latter got this as an import game under the title Smash Table Tennis).

Konami's Ping Pong was made available on Microsoft's Game Room service for its Xbox 360 console and for Windows-based PCs in June 2010.

Smash Ping Pong was digitally re-released in Japan only as part of Nintendo Switch Online's Nintendo Classics library in December 2020.

Hamster Corporation released the game as part of their Arcade Archives series for the Nintendo Switch and PlayStation 4 as Konami's Table Tennis in November 2024.
