= Commodore Computing International =

Computing magazine published in the UK

- Volume 6, No. 12 cover
- Categories: Computer magazine
- Frequency: Ten times per year
- Publisher: Nick Hampshire Publications
- Founder: Nick Hampshire
- Founded: 1980
- Final issue: 1990
- Company: Nick Hampshire Publications; Croftward Limited
- Country: United Kingdom
- Based in: London
- Language: English
- ISSN: 0265-475X
- OCLC: 499673707

Commodore Computing International was a magazine for the Commodore range of computers, including the Commodore 64, Amiga, and Commodore PC range. The magazine was in circulation from 1980 to 1990.

== History and profile ==
Commodore Computing International was established by Nick Hampshire in 1980. The publisher was Nick Hampshire Publications. Later issues were published by Croftward Limited. The magazine had its headquarters in London. It folded in 1990.
