= Alternative Software =

British software developer and publisher

Alternative Software Ltd.
- Traded as: Alternative Software
- Industry: Software industry
- Genre: Software industry
- Founded: 1985; 41 years ago
- Headquarters: United Kingdom
- Website: alternativesoft.co.uk

Alternative Software is a British software developer and publisher founded in 1985.

From the mid 1980s to the early 1990s, the company published well over a hundred games, primarily for the 8-bit computer formats in the budget (£1.99 to £3.99) market. These included both original titles (e.g. MC Lothlorien's Pro Mountain Bike Simulator) as well as reissues of other developers' and publishers' software such as River Rescue which it acquired from the liquidation of Creative Sparks Distribution. In 1988, the company's catalogue expanded rapidly when it obtained the rights to re-release games from Piranha Software, Audiogenic, Incentive and Bubble Bus.

By late 1988, Commodore Computing International were noting Alternative's success, observing that it had topped Gallup's market share charts almost every week since June of that year, been the number one software house in 7 out of 8 Gallup charts and averaged a market share of 11.2% versus its nearest rival Mastertronic with 10.5%.

In 1989, the company began to produce titles centred around popular children's television characters. Beginning with Postman Pat, which the company claimed was the first time a licence had been acquired by a budget software house, later games would feature Count Duckula, Fireman Sam, Sooty, Thomas the Tank Engine, The Wombles and many others.

In a 2015 interview, founder Roger Hulley claimed that by 1990 the company had a 17 percent share of the budget games sector.

During the late 1990s, the company diversified into development of "paint studio", "print studio" and similar-type software. As of 2018, the company is still active, with publication Retro Gamer noting in their 30-year retrospective of Alternative that they had "constantly evolved in order to stay afloat in an increasingly tough industry".
