= Movie (video game) =

1986 video game

- Publisher: Imagine Software
- Writer: Duško Dimitrijević
- Platforms: Amstrad CPC, ZX Spectrum
- Release: 1986
- Genre: Adventure
- Mode: Single-player

Movie is a video game written by Duško Dimitrijević for the ZX Spectrum and Amstrad CPC and was published by Imagine Software in 1986.

== Plot ==
Movie is set in New York City in the 1930s. The player takes the role of Jack Marlow, a private investigator who must enter the headquarters of mob boss Bugs Malloy in order to retrieve an audiotape. In order to help him complete this task, Marlow needs the help of a girl called Tanya. Unfortunately, she has an identical twin called Vanya who is allied to Malloy and who will deliberately lead him into trouble.

== Gameplay ==
The game is an arcade adventure which uses an isometric display to portray the action, described by several publications as similar to that of Knightlore. Movement is achieved by rotating the main character and moving him forward. The player can also access a panel of icons which allow Marlow to carry out certain actions such as dropping and taking items, firing his gun, punching, throwing an item or talking. The latter is performed using speech bubbles in which the player can type out words and phrases using the keyboard.

== Reception ==
Reception

Award
Publication	Award
Crash	Smash

The game met a highly positive reception, with several magazines giving the game their respective awards:

- Computer & Video Games: Game of the month
- Crash Magazine: an overall rating of 93%, and the label of A Crash Smash
- Your Sinclair: a rating of 9 (out of 10), and the Megagame award
- Sinclair User gave the game a SU Classic award

== See also ==
- Contact Sam Cruise, a similar private investigator themed game also for the ZX Spectrum and released in 1986
