= List of Amstrad PCW games =

This is a list of video games for the Amstrad PCW home computer series. There are currently 197 games on this list.

Title	Year	Publisher
3D Clock Chess	1985	ACE Software
500 c.c. Championship	1990	OMK Software
Academy	1987	CRL
Ace (Air Combat Emulator)	1987	Cascade Games
Acheton	1987	Topologika
Adventure Quest	1986	Rainbird Software
After Shock	1986	Interceptor Software
Angel Nieto Pole 500	1990	Opera Software
Annals of Rome	1986	Personal Software Services
Archers, The	1986	Level 9 Computing / Mosaic Publishing
Armaggedon Man, The	1986	Martech Games
Arnhem	1985	Cases Computer Simulations
Avon	1989	Topologika
Ballyhoo	1986	Infocom
Batman	1986	Ocean Software
Blackstar	1986	CRL
Blagger	1987	Alligata Software
Bob Winner	1986	Loriciels
Bounder	1986	Gremlin Graphics Software
Brian Clough's Football Fortunes	19??	CDS Software
Brick	1989	Diabolic
Bridge Player 2000	1989	CP Software
Bridge Player 3	1986	CP Software
Bridge Player Galactica 2150	1989	CP Software
Buran	1990	OMK Software
Castle Blackstar	1986	CRL
Catch 23	1987	Martech Games
Chichen Itza	1985	Aventuras AD
Classic Collection vol 1 (Hopp It, Much It, Shoot It)	1987	Mikrogen
Classic Collection vol 2 (Climb it, Skiing, Caverns)	1987	Microvalue / Tynesoft
Classic Games (Clock Chess '88, Bridge Player, Backgammon, Draughts)	1988	CP Software
Classic Games 2	1987	Microvalue
Classic Invaders	1986	Bubble Bus
Clock Chess '89	1988	CP Software
Colossal Adventure	1986	Rainbird Software
Colossus 4 Bridge	1986	CDS Software
Colossus 4 Chess	1986	CDS Software
Complete Home Entertainment Centre, The	1990	CDS Software
Corruption	1988	Magnetic Scrolls
Corsarios	1989	Opera Software
Countdown to Doom	1987	Topologika
Crossgrid	1991	DGC Software
Crusoe	1985	Automata UK
Cubik-Road	1990	Proein Software Line / OMK Software
Cutthroats	1986	Infocom
Cyberbig	1989	MCM Software
Cyrus II Chess	1986	Intelligent Chess Software
Deadline	1986	Infocom
Distractions (On the Run, 2112AD & NEXOR)	1987	Design Design
Double T Patience	1988	Thurston Techniques
Dungeon Adventure	1986	Rainbird Software
Enchanter	1986	Infocom
Fairlight	1986	The Edge
Fairlight II	1986	The Edge
Fantasy Quest	1986	PCW Software / CPC (Minehead)
Filthy Rich	1990	Wadd Software
Fish!	1988	Magnetic Scrolls / Rainbird Software
Football Fortunes	1987	CDS Software
Forestland	1987	Supersoft
Formula 1	198?	OMK Software
Fourth Protocol, The	1986	Century Communications
Frank Bruno's Boxing	1985	Elite Systems
Fun School 3: For 5–7 Year Olds	1990	Database Educational Software
Fun School 3: For the Over 7s	1990	Database Educational Software
Fun School 3: For the Under 5s	1990	Database Educational Software
Giant Killer	1987	Topologika
Gnome Ranger	1987	Level 9 Computing
Goblin Tower	1986	Supersoft
Golden Basket	1990	Opera Software
Gonzzalezz	1989	Opera Software
Goody	1988	Opera Software
Graham Gooch's Test Cricket	1986	Audiogenic
Grand Slam	1989	OMK Software
Green	1990	Classic Software
Growing Pains of Adrian Mole, The	1986	Virgin Games / Level 9 Computing
Guardian	1986	Alligata Software
Guild of Thieves, The	1987	Rainbird Software
Head Coach v3	1988	Coda Software
Head Over Heels	1987	Ocean Software
Heathrow Air Traffic Control	1987	Hewson Consultants
Heroes of Karn	1985	Interceptor Software
Hezarin	1987	Topologika
Hitch Hiker's Guide to the Galaxy, The	1986	Infocom
Hollywood Hijinx	1986	Infocom
Home Entertainment Centre (5 games in 1)	1988	CDS Software
Infidel	1986	Infocom
Ingrid's Back	1988	Level 9 Computing
Jai Alai	1991	Opera Software
Jewels of Darkness	1986	Rainbird Software
Jinxter	1987	Rainbird Software
Junior Playtime	1991	DGC Software
Kingdom of Hamil	1987	Topologika
Knight Orc	1987	Rainbird Software
Krom El Guerrero	1989	OMK Software
La Aventura Espacial	1990	Dinamic Software
La Corona Mágica	1990	OMK Software
La Diosa Cozumel	1990	Aventuras AD
Lancelot	1988	Mandarin Software
Last Days of Doom	1988	Topologika
Last Mission, The	1987	Opera Software
Last Ninja 2	1988	System 3 Software
Leaderboard Golf	1986	US Gold
Leather Goddesses of Phobos	1986	Infocom
Linebreaker	1990	Wadd Software
Living Daylights, The	1987	Domark
Livingstone Supongo	1986	Opera Software
Livingstone Supongo II	1989	Opera Software
Lord of the Rings	1985	Melbourne House
Los Inhumanos	1990	Delta Software
Los Templos Sagrados	1991	Aventuras AD
Lurking Horror, The	1987	Infocom
Match Day II	1987	Ocean Software
Micro Trivia	1987	Harold Gale Associates
Mindfighter	1988	Activision / Abstract Concepts
Mithos	1990	Opera Software
Monsters of Murdac	1986	Global Software
Moonmist	1986	Infocom
Mortadelo y Filemon 2 (Clever & Smart 2)	1990	Dro Software
Mot	1989	Opera Software
Mountain Leader	1986	PCW Software / CPC (Minehead)
Mr. Gas	1990	Proein Software Line
Mundial De Fútbol	1990	Opera Software
Mutan Zone	1988	Opera Software
Myth	1989	Magnetic Scrolls
Nemesis (4 in 1 text adventure)	1990	Nemesis Software
Pattern Puzzles	1991	HTB Computers
Pawn, The	1986	Rainbird Software
PCW Challenge (ACE, Formula 1, Skywar & Strip Poker)	1990	Artronics
Peter Gerrand’s Games Plus	1991	Peter Gerrand / PCW User
Philosopher's Quest	1987	Topologika
Planetfall	1986	Infocom
Poli Díaz	1991	Opera Software
Psi-5 Trading Company	1987	US Gold
Quiwi	1986	Kingsoft
Rescate en el Golfo	1990	Opera Software
Return to Doom	1988	Topologika
Robot Scape	1988	Mar Entertainments / Sygran
Sargon	1990	Mal O'Bide System
SAS Raid	1986	CRL
Scapeghost	1989	Level 9 Computing
School’s Out	1990	DGC Software
Scrabble	1986	Leisure Genius
Scrabble Deluxe	1987	Leisure Genius
Seastalker	1986	Infocom
Secret Diary of Adrian Mole, The	1985	Level 9 Computing / Mosaic Publishing
Silicon Dreams	1986	Rainbird Software / Level 9 Computing
Sir Perceval (also known as Sir Lancelot)	1985	OMK Software
Sirwood	1989	Opera Software
Sky War	1988	OMK Software
Snowball	1986	Rainbird Software
Sol Negro	1988	Opera Software
Sorcerer	1986	Infocom
Southern Belle	1985	Hewson Consultants
Soviet	1990	Opera Software
Space Combat	1989	OMK Software
Spellbreaker	1985	Infocom
Spitfire 40	1986	Mirrorsoft
Sporting Triangles	1989	CDS Software
Spy Snatcher	1991	Topologika
Star Byte	1987	Mister Chip
Starcross	1986	Infocom
Starglider	1986	Rainbird Software
Stationfall	1987	Infocom
Steve Davis Snooker	198?	CDS Software
Strike Force Harrier	1986	Mirrorsoft
Strip Poker	1985	CORE
Sun Crosswords Vol. 1 & 2, The	1988	Akom
Supernova Invaders	1986	Supernova Software
Suspect	1986	Infocom
Suspended	1986	Infocom
Tank Attack	1989	CDS Software
Tau Ceti	1986	CRL
Terracom	1990	Proein Software Line / OMK Software
Test Cricket	1987	PCW Software / CPC (Minehead)
Tetris	1987	Mirrorsoft
Time and Magik	1988	Mandarin Software
Time Crosswords Vol. 1-4, The	1988	Akom
Tomahawk	1986	Digital Integration
Treasure Hunt	1986	Macsen Software
Trivial Pursuit	1986	Domark
Troglo	1986	ACE Software
Tuma 7	1990	Delta Software
UK Trivia	1987	Cartographic Software
Ulises	1987	Opera Software
Ultimate Quiz	1989	DGC Software
Ultimate Sums	1990	DGC Software
Verbiage	1989	Tynesoft
Very Big Cave Adventure, The	1986	CRL
Wishbringer	1985	Infocom
Witch Hunt	1987	River Software
Witness, The	1986	Infocom
World of Soccer	1988	Coda Software
The Worm in Paradise	1985	Level 9 Computing
Yes Chancellor!	1985	Topologika
Zork	1986	Infocom
Zork II	1986	Infocom
Zork III	1986	Infocom

== See also ==
- Lists of video games
- List of Amstrad CPC games
