= The Worm in Paradise =

1985 video game

- Developer: Level 9 Computing
- Publisher: Level 9 Computing
- Series: Silicon Dreams
- Platforms: Amstrad CPC, Commodore 64, ZX Spectrum, MSX
- Release: 1985
- Genre: Interactive fiction

Spectrum screenshot from The Worm in Paradise

The Worm in Paradise is the third and final video game in the Silicon Dreams trilogy, a series of text adventure games in which the player takes the role of Kim Kimberly. It is the sequel to Snowball and Return to Eden. Worm in Paradise takes place generations after the first two games, when the planet Eden has been colonised. The player is an ordinary citizen in Eden's most populous city, Enoch. The game was noteworthy for having significant social commentary relative to other games of the same genre and era. The game drew inspiration from the novel 1984.

Commodore 64 screen copy of The Worm in Paradise.

== Plot ==
A hundred years after the arrival of colonists aboard the Snowball 9, planet Eden has become home to half a billion people. In this paradise managed by robots there is not any crime, taxes, unemployment, or freedom. The population lives in a domed "megapolis", and, perhaps due to the war that occurred during Return to Eden, there is not any contact between the cities and the surrounding natural world. The occasional sighting of flying saucers keeps the population afraid to go outside.

The main character, a nameless citizen of Enoch, starts the game in a beautiful garden where everything seems fine. He picks an apple from a tree, a worm pops out, and the player follows it outside the garden, through the desert, and then he awakens. It was only a simulation, one of the many forms of entertainment available during the reign of the third Kim. This "Garden of Eden as a prison" allegory sets the mood for the entire game. The objective is to explore the city, and while doing so the player must gather clues to unmask the government conspiracy behind the flying saucers.

== Development ==
The Worm in Paradise is the third and final instalment of the Silicon Dreams trilogy and is a departure from the previous games. It "evolved alongside a 12 month enhancement on Level 9's own adventure system. Standard features include a 1,000 word vocabulary, a very highly-advanced English input, memory-enhancing text compression, the now familiar and very much appreciated type-ahead, and multi-tasking so a player need never wait while a picture is drawn." This was the first game using version 3 of the A-Code system. It was released for four fewer platforms, excluding the Lynx, Memotech MTX, Nascom and Oric-1 compared to the two previous releases.

Another difference is that the player has only seven days, within the game's clock, to complete the game. Quests are also time-based and require that the player arrive at certain locations at specific hours to achieve the desired goal. And while game play remains the same, the backdrop is no longer an action adventure, but a political thriller that resembles the novel Nineteen Eighty-Four. Similar to what happened when Snowball was released, there was certain confusion about the main character's identity and the time when the story is set. The Level 9 Fact Sheet says: "...a couple of years later, Kim Kimberley has become a legend on Eden." Another article stated: "Worm in Paradise is set 100 years later. You are now Kim Kimberley III..." Furthermore, Pete Austin said, "Worm is set on Eden, about 50 years in the future" and "The player is not Kim - she becomes mayor and runs the place." Notice that these sources termed the game by its original name, Worm in Paradise.

== Reception ==
Reception

Award
Publication	Award
Crash	Smash

John Sweeney for Page 6 said "It is an excellent adventure in its class."

Colette McDermott for Sinclair Programs said "Not only does it complete an excellent set of adventures, but the graphics will stimulate your visual powers."

Richard Price for Sinclair User wrote "This is the finest of Level 9's masterly adventures. It has an intricate, exciting, intelligent plot based in an equally intricate society run by baffling futuristic machines."

John Ransley for Commodore User said "You'd have to spend an evening with a Roget's Thesaurus to come up with enough superlatives to do justice to The Worm in Paradise; it not offers stunning (albeit it at times disturbing) originality in the overworked realm of science fiction but also embodies state-of-the-art programming techniques which will allow you effortlessly to give full rein to your powers of creative deduction – and there are always those 200 or more colourful graphics to visually help you along the way."

Derek Brewster for Crash said "The story, descriptive depth, vocabulary, and the many sophisticated features go to make Level 9's latest a really good adventure game."

"The Pilgrim" for Amstrad Action said "Can it be as good as it sounds – because it sounds out of this world! Well, out of this world it certainly is."

Keith Campbell for Computer and Video Games said "Here is science-fiction-based political saga which you can just sit back and enjoy, or, if you prefer, involve yourself at a more challenging level in an attempt to reach the seat of power and save the world. Play it either way — I'm sure you'll agree it's superb!"

Roger Garrett for Popular Computing Weekly said "Even the more experienced player, who has a certain amount of knowledge about Level 9 games, will find it quite taxing but definitely rewarding. Congratulations, Level 9 on another imaginative hit."

Your Computer praised the title as a "text and graphics masterpiece," highlighting the speed of its drawing engine and its advanced command parser. The reviewer commended the game's large vocabulary, numerous puzzles, and "lovingly crafted" plot.

The Worm in Paradise was rated a Your Sinclair Megagame, and a Sinclair User Classic.
