= Emerald Isle (video game) =

1984 video game

- Developer: Level 9 Computing
- Publisher: Level 9 Computing
- Platforms: Atari 8-bit, Amstrad CPC, BBC Micro, Commodore 64, MSX, ZX Spectrum
- Release: 1984
- Genre: Interactive fiction
- Mode: Single-player

Emerald Isle is a 1984 interactive fiction game developed and published by Level 9 Computing for various home computer platforms. A plane has crashed after being struck by a storm over the Bermuda Triangle. The sole occupant has escaped by parachute and finds himself on an unknown island inhabited by strange peoples and creatures.

== Gameplay ==
The game is a standard text adventure with limited graphics on some platforms.

== Reception ==
John Sweeney writing for Page 6 said: "For anyone who has not yet taken the plunge into adventuring, and can't afford to buy an Infocom adventure such as Wishbringer, Emerald Isle offers an excellent introduction to a very enjoyable pastime."

=== Reviews ===
- Crash! - May, 1985
- Sinclair Programs - May, 1985
- Zzap! - May, 1985
- Computer and Video Games - May, 1985
- Sinclair User - May, 1985
- Popular Computing Weekly - Apr 04, 1985
- Tilt - Jul, 1986
- Computer Gamer - Apr, 1985
