= Lords of Time =

1983 video game

- Developer: Level 9 Computing
- Publisher: Level 9 Computing
- Designer: Sue Gazzard
- Platforms: Amiga, Amstrad CPC, Amstrad PCW, Atari ST, Atari 8-bit, BBC Micro, Commodore 64, Enterprise, Camputers Lynx, Memotech MTX, MSX, Nascom, Oric-1, MS-DOS, ZX Spectrum.
- Release: 1983
- Genre: Adventure
- Mode: Single-player

Lords of Time is an interactive fiction game designed by Sue Gazzard and released by Level 9 Computing in 1983. Originally purely a textual adventure for 8-bit microcomputers, the game was later released as part of the Time and Magik compilation where graphics were added for all floppy disk versions. Like all Level 9 adventures of its time, it was written in the in-house, platform independent A-code language.

== Gameplay ==
The anonymous hero of the game (controlled by the player) appears to be a computer programmer in contemporary times. At the start of the game, the hero is contacted by Father Time who sends the hero on a quest to recover nine treasures in order to defeat the machinations of the evil Time Lords. The game is divided into 9 eras of time (not including the starting section in the hero's living room), such as the 20th century, Ice Age, age of dinosaurs, Dark Ages, future, the Middle Ages, Tudor England and the Roman Empire. Due to the meddling of the Time Lords anachronisms abound, for example cavemen are found living in the same era as dinosaurs.

Access to the nine different eras is via a grandfather clock that turns out to be a time machine in disguise.

The game was re-released in 1988 as part of the Time and Magik compilation alongside Red Moon and Price of Magik. Although positioned within the compilation as the first part of a trilogy it has no real connection to the latter two (as opposed to the sister compilation release Silicon Dreams where all three games did form a trilogy).

== Reception ==
Reception to Lords of Time was positive. Crash reviewing the Spectrum version declared "I find it impossible to justly describe what a brilliant adventure Lords of Time really is". A Computer and Video Games magazine multiformat review claimed "..the game is a light-hearted one which is fun to play, not too difficult to progress in, but will, I suspect, take rather a long time to complete. Who could ask for more?" Personal Computer Games rated it a PCG Hit.
