= The Price of Magik =

1986 video game

- Developer: Level 9 Computing
- Publisher: Level 9 Computing
- Series: Time and Magik
- Platforms: Amstrad CPC, Atari 8-bit, BBC Micro, Commodore 64, MSX, ZX Spectrum
- Release: 1986
- Genre: Interactive fiction
- Mode: Single-player

The Price of Magik is the third game in the Time and Magik trilogy.

== Gameplay ==
Sequel to the previous game; Myglar the Magician, guardian of the Crystal, has become insane and is draining its energy for his own use; he must be defeated before it is exhausted.

== Reception ==
Reception

Awards
Publication	Award
Crash	Crash Smash
Sinclair User	SU Classic
Your Sinclair	Megagame

John Sweeney for Page 6 said "this adventure is excellent value for money. Congratulations on another great game, Level 9."

Amtix said "No doubt the game will be another smashing success. It's just a pity that all their imagination seemed to be exhausted in well hidden ideas and nothing was left to beef up the plot or flavour the atmosphere."

Keith Campbell for Commodore User said "as with all Level 9 games, one can only say, 'Their best yet!'"

Rob Steel for The Games Machine said "There is nothing to bind the adventure together, it is simply a number of rooms containing unexciting creatures, clues to one of the 18 spells or nothing of interest."

- Sinclair User, review of The Price of Magik:
  "... further proof of Level 9's position as the leading UK adventure house... Everything in The Price of Magik is for the best - plot, parser, graphics, and above all the execution of the game."
