= Level 9 Computing =

British computer software developer

- Founded: 1981
- Founder: Mike Austin; Pete Austin; Nick Austin
- Defunct: 1991
- Headquarters: United Kingdom
- Products: Video games

This version of Return to Eden illustrates the general cover design used for most of Level 9's self-published releases. The "L9" logo is used as a background motif.

Level 9 was a British developer of computer software, active between 1981 and 1991. Founded by Mike, Nicholas and Pete Austin, the company produced software for the BBC Micro, Nascom, ZX Spectrum, Commodore 64, Oric, Atari 8-bit computers, Camputers Lynx, RML 380Z, Amstrad CPC, MSX, Amiga, Apple II, Memotech MTX and Enterprise platforms, and is best known for its successful text adventure games until a general decline in the text adventure market forced their closure in June 1991.

Level 9's first release was an extension to Nascom BASIC called Extension Basic. The first game, also for the Nascom, was called Fantasy and was similar to Valhalla, but with no graphics. Other products from that era were Missile Defence, Bomber and Space Invasion — all for the Nascom. The tapes were duplicated and sent out by mail order by the brothers based on orders generated by the classified advertisements they ran in the Computing Today magazine. They were originally based in High Wycombe, Bucks before moving to the West Country.

== A-code ==
Level 9 devised their own interpreted language, A-code, around 1979. It was very memory efficient, mainly due to the advanced text compression routines which could compress texts to about 50%. The game data, which was identical for all platforms, was incorporated into the executable file for specific machines, together with the interpreter part. A-code underwent a few revisions: there are three distinct versions in all, plus several extensions which form new A-code versions of their own.

(Level 9 A-code should not be confused with the A-code language developed by Dave Platt in 1979 for the purpose of writing the highly popular 550 points extension of the original Adventure game.)

In some ways A-code and the A-machine virtual machine were even more impressive than rival Infocom's ZIL and Z-machine; both companies initially designed games for computers with 32K RAM and ZIL was in many ways more sophisticated. But Infocom products of the era required a disk drive, alleviating the memory restrictions of the platforms of the time. Level 9 due to different dynamics in the British market had to deliver their text adventures on cassette tapes, which generally meant that programs had to be loaded in one go and that they had to completely fit into memory. Andrew Deeley, who worked for Level 9 on Software Development, recalls how the use of the A-Code interpreter enabled L9 to produce hundreds of cross platform versions of their entire catalogue in the space of 18 months, "with so many 8 bit computers on the markets and the introduction of Macs, Amigas and Atari STs, developing for cross platform versions of a game was becoming prohibitive in cost back in the late 1980s / early 1990s. Level 9 were able to hold their own as a small developer because they were able to optimise cross platform production of their games". The first game to use this system was Colossal Adventure in early 1982, a faithful conversion of Adventure by Will Crowther and Don Woods, but with 70 extra locations to the end game to fulfill Level 9's preexisting claim in advertisements of "over 200" locations; a remarkable achievement given that Gordon Letwin's port of Adventure to the TRS-80 required a disk drive. That year the company produced two sequels, Adventure Quest and Dungeon Adventure, both of which featured the Demon Lord Agaliarept. The three titles became known as the Middle-earth trilogy, with a reference in the instructions to Dungeon Adventure to the city of Minas Tirith, which features in J. R. R. Tolkien's The Lord of the Rings. When enhanced versions of the three games were published by Rainbird Software, the reference to Middle-earth was quietly deleted; the series became known as Jewels of Darkness; and Minas Tirith became Valaii. In 1985 Level 9 started to develop their games for disk based systems also.

Snowball was the first adventure in the Silicon Dreams trilogy, followed by Return to Eden and The Worm in Paradise. Red Moon and its sequel The Price of Magik were bundled together with Lords of Time by Mandarin Software to create yet another trilogy: Time and Magik.

Lancelot was published by Mandarin Software, a division of Europress Software in 1988. The first person to solve the puzzle in the game won a replica of the Holy Grail, made of solid silver, encrusted with semi-precious stones (amethysts, garnets and opals), with the inside plated in 22-carat gold.

== List of software ==
- Extension BASIC for the Nascom (198x)
- rqFORTH for the BBC Micro (198x)
- rqFORTH toolkit for the BBC Micro (198x)
- Compass for the Lynx (198x)

== List of action games ==
- Fantasy (198x)
- Space Invasion (198x)
- Bomber (198x)
- Missile Defence (198x)

== List of text adventure games ==
- Colossal Adventure (1982)
- Adventure Quest (1982)
- Dungeon Adventure (1982)
- Snowball (1983)
- Lords of Time (1983)
- Return to Eden (1984)
- Emerald Isle (1985)
- Red Moon (1985)
- The Worm in Paradise (1985)
- The Secret Diary of Adrian Mole Aged 13¾ (for Mosaic Publishing, 1985)
- The Archers (for Mosaic, 1985)
- The Saga of Erik the Viking (for Mosaic, 1985)
- The Price of Magik (1986)
- Jewels of Darkness trilogy (for Rainbird Software, 1986) (also known as the Middle-Earth Trilogy)
  - Colossal Adventure
  - Adventure Quest
  - Dungeon Adventure
- Silicon Dreams trilogy (for Rainbird, 1986)
  - Snowball
  - Return to Eden
  - The Worm in Paradise
- Knight Orc (for Rainbird Software, 1987)
- The Growing Pains of Adrian Mole (for Virgin Games, 1987)
- Gnome Ranger (1987)
- Time and Magik trilogy (for Mandarin Software, 1988)
  - Lords of Time
  - Red Moon
  - The Price of Magik
- Lancelot (for Mandarin, 1988)
- Ingrid's Back: Gnome Ranger 2 (for Mandarin, 1988)
- Scapeghost (1989)
- The Legend of Billy the Kid (for Ocean Software, 1990; never released)
- Champion of the Raj (1991)
- It Came from the Desert (PC port for Cinemaware, 1991)
