= Enterprise (computer) =

Zilog Z80-based home computer

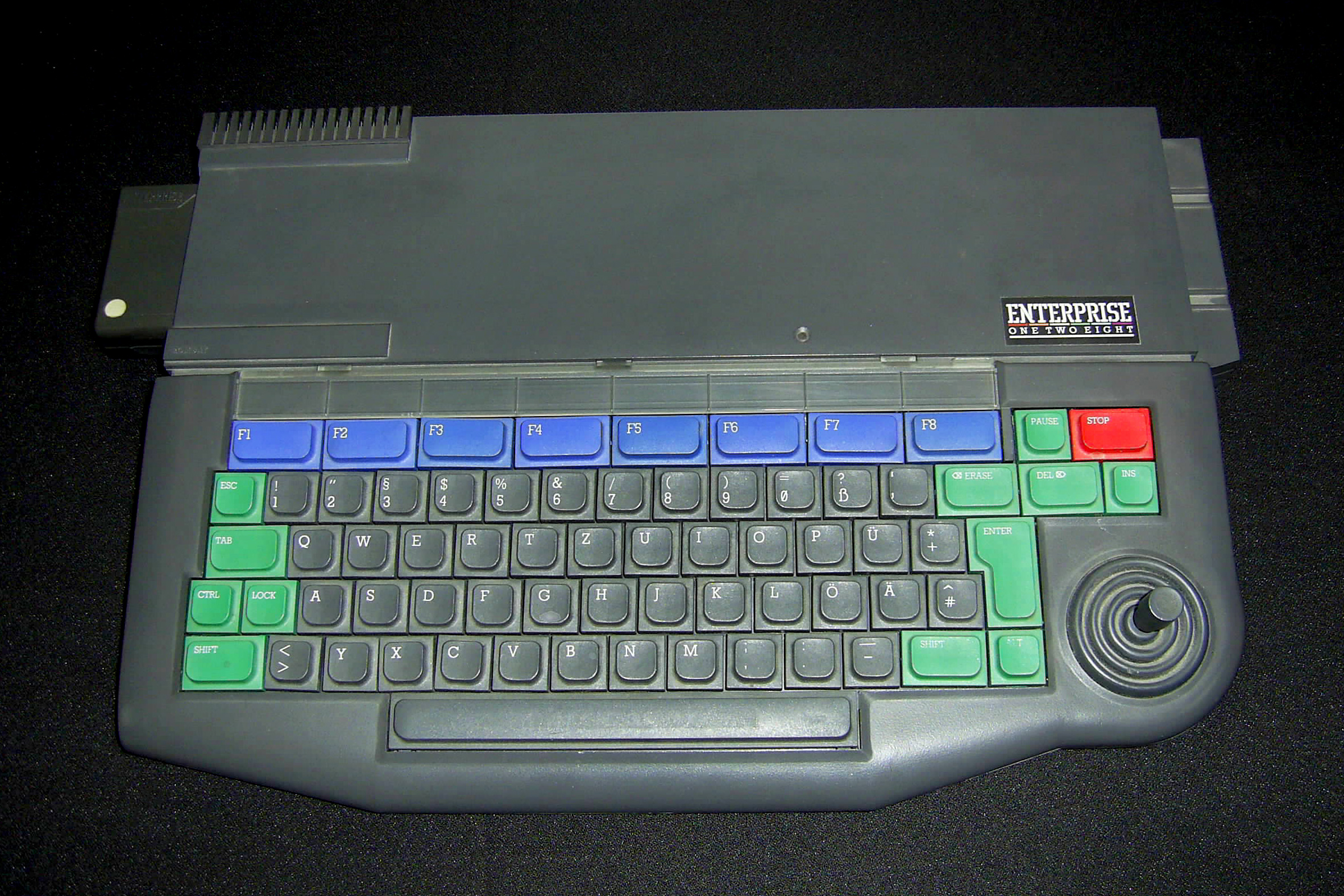
- Developer: Intelligent Software
- Type: Home computer
- Released: 23 June 1985; 41 years ago
- Units shipped: 80,000
- Operating system: EXOS, BASIC (on cartridge)
- CPU: Zilog Z80A @ 4 MHz
- Memory: 64 KB / 128 KB up to 4MB
- Display: 80 × 256, 256 colours; 320 × 256, 4 colours; 160 × 256, 16 colours; 640 × 512 interlaced, 640 × 256 non-interlaced, 2 colours
- Graphics: "Nick" ASIC
- Sound: "Dave" ASIC (3 channels + noise)
- Connectivity: RGB out, serial port, printer port, joystick ports, cassette tape interfaces, cartridge slot, expansion port

The Enterprise is a Zilog Z80-based home computer announced in 1983, but due to a series of delays, was not commercially available until 1985. It was developed by British company Intelligent Software and marketed by Enterprise Computers.

The specification as released was powerful and one of the higher end in its class (though not by the margin envisaged in 1983). This was due to the use of custom ASICs for graphics and sound which took workload away from the CPU, an extensive implementation of ANSI BASIC and a bank switching system to allow for larger amounts of RAM than the Z80 natively supported. It also featured a distinctive and colourful case design, and promise of multiple expansion options. Its two variants are the Enterprise 64, with 64 KB of RAM, and the Enterprise 128, with 128 KB of RAM.

The machine was renamed several times during development, being known variously as Samurai, Oscar and Elan. Versions can sometimes been found in magazine articles referred to by the preceding monikers. Ultimately, not assisted by release delays and a changing market place, the Enterprise was not commercially successful. The manufacturer called in the receivers in 1986 with significant debt, although old stock continued to be sold through a German partner until well into the 1990s.

== Hardware ==
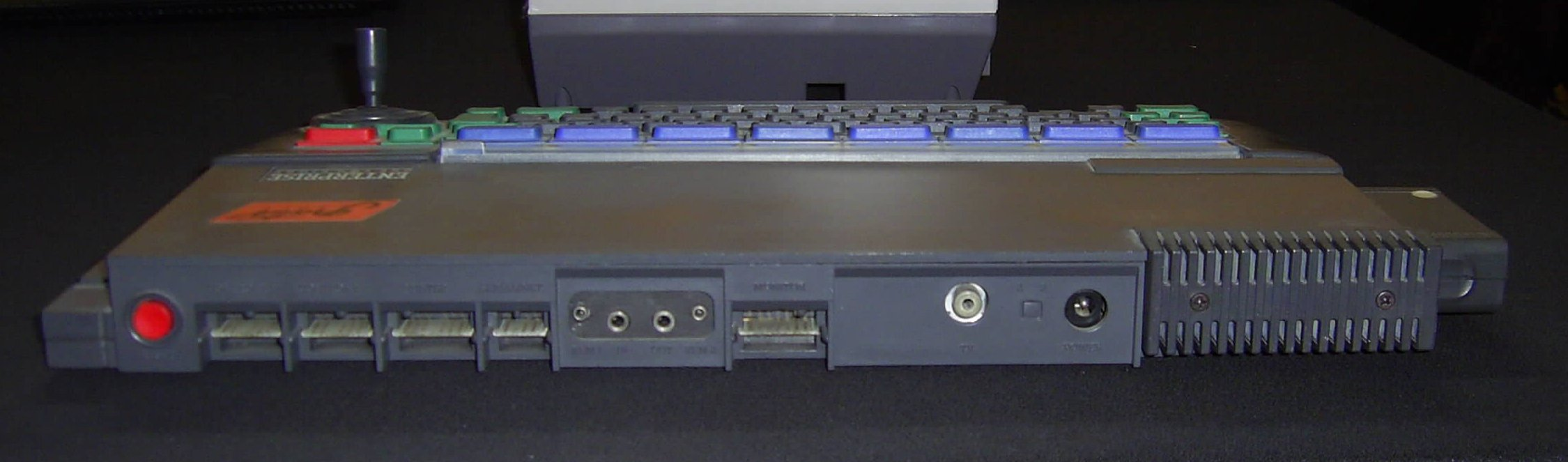
Enterprise 128 rear view

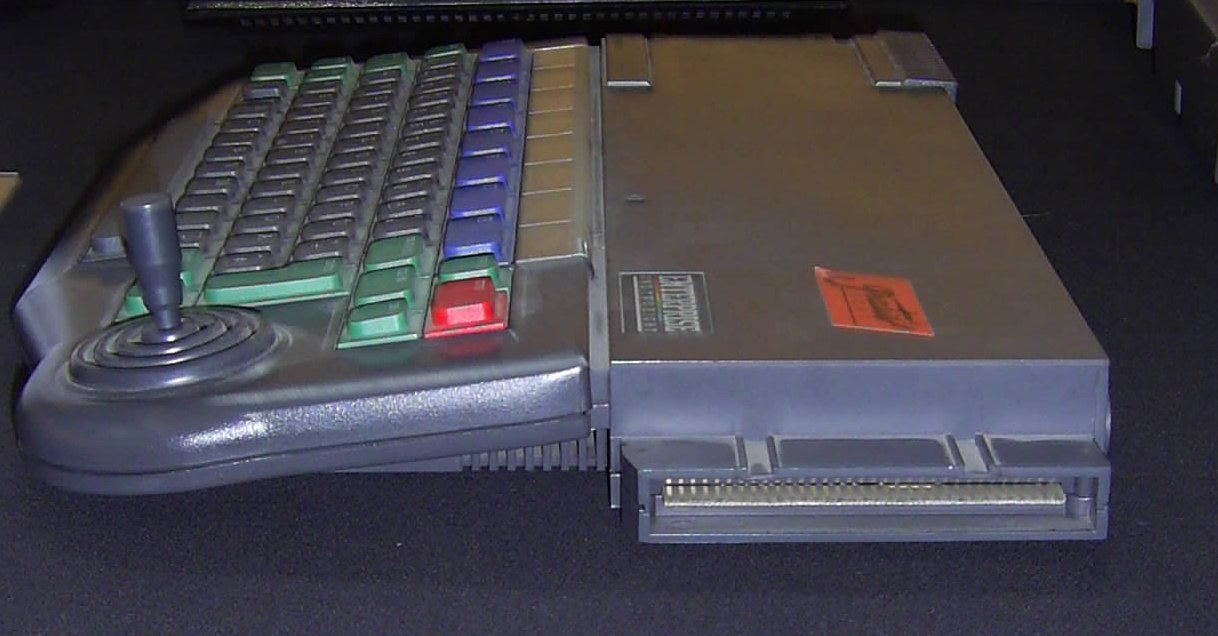
Enterprise 128 right view

=== CPU, memory and ASIC chips ===
The Enterprise has a 4 megahertz (MHz) Z80 Central processing unit (CPU), 64 KB (65,536 bytes) or 128 KB of RAM, and 32 KB (32,768 bytes) of internal read-only memory (ROM) that contains the EXOS operating system and a screen editor / word processor. The BASIC programming language was supplied on a 16 KB ROM module.

Two application-specific integrated circuit (ASIC) chips take some of the workload off of the central processor. They are named "Nick" and "Dave" after their designers, Nick Toop, who had previously worked on the Acorn Atom, and Dave Woodfield. "Nick" manages graphics, while "Dave" handles sound and memory paging (bank switching).

A bank switching scheme allows the memory to be expanded to a maximum of 4 megabytes (4,194,304 bytes). The highest 2 address lines from the Z80 are used to select one of the four 8-bit Page Registers in the Dave chip. The output from the selected register is used as the highest 8 bits of the 22-bit address bus, while the lowest 14 bits come directly from the Z80 address bus. Effectively, the 64 KB address space of the Z80 processor is divided into four 16k sections. Any 16k page from the 4 MB address space can be mapped to any of these sections. The lowest two pages (pages 0 and 1) of the 4 MB address space contain system ROM. The next four pages (2 to 5) are reserved for a ROM cartridge (max 64 KB). The top four pages (pages 252 to 255, totaling 64 KB) are used as video RAM, but can be used for storage of program code and data as well. On the 128k model, the additional 64 KB of ram is mapped on pages 248 to 251. The remaining memory space can be used by external devices and memory modules connected to the expansion bus.

=== Keyboard and case ===
The case is unusual in that it contains both a full-sized keyboard with programmable function keys, and a joystick. Its distinctive shape was due to the designers' desire to break away from customary designs. The low-profile keyboard is constructed with mechanical keycaps on top of a rubber membrane and has a standard layout, but the feel of the keys was disliked by many, or even most people, because the keys weren't "full travel", but had a squishy feel, similar to a Sinclair QL or Spectrum+. The joystick replaces the normal cursor keys, and allows the cursor to be moved diagonally.

Royal College of Art graduates Geoff Hollington and Nick Oakley were responsible for the design, having tendered for this particular contract, and had only seven days to produce the visual design concept. Tooling for production of the casing was also demanded in a rapid timeframe and took five months. Originally, a combination of greys was envisaged for the casing elements, but seeking to avoid the look of office equipment and to appeal to "the lower end of the market", the eventual dark grey case with red, green and blue keys was chosen.

=== Graphics ===
Enterprise has four hardware graphics modes: 40-column text modes, Lo-Res and Hi-Res bit mapped graphics, and attribute graphics. The OS offers 80-column text via high-resolution graphics mode. Bit mapped graphics modes allow selection between displays of 2, 4, 16 or 256 colours (from a 3-3-2 bit RGB palette), but horizontal resolution decreases as colour depth increases. Interlaced and non-interlaced modes are available. The maximum resolution is 640 × 512 pixels interlaced, or 640 × 256 pixels non-interlaced. These resolutions permit only a 2-colour display. A 256-colour display has a maximum resolution of 80 × 256. The attribute graphics mode provides a 320 × 256 pixel resolution with 16 colours, selectable from a palette of 256.

Multiple pages can be displayed simultaneously on the screen, even if their graphics modes are different. Each page has its own palette, which allows more colours to be displayed onscreen simultaneously. The page height can be larger than the screen or the window it is displayed on. Each page is connected to a channel of the EXOS operating system, so it is possible to write on a hidden page.

=== Sound ===
The sound is handled by the second ASIC chip, "Dave", and has 3 sound channels plus a noise channel. Each channel's sound can be placed freely in the stereo image. Available effects include distortion, low-pass and high-pass filters, and ring modulation.

The Enterprise firmware also provides programmable envelope generators that are more flexible than synthesizers' traditional ADSR envelope, and allow up to 255 phases to be specified for each envelope. On each phase, the envelope can adjust the sound's pitch and stereo balance.

=== Interfaces ===
The Enterprise included an array of connectors far beyond what was common on home computers of the time. There is an RGB output, a RS-232 / RS-423 serial port, a Centronics printer port, two external joystick ports, two cassette tape interfaces, a ROM cartridge slot, and an ordinary expansion port. To save expense, many of the connectors did not use sockets, but instead had simple edge connectors that used the exposed traces at the edge of the printed circuit board.

The BASIC ROM can be replaced by a ROM that emulates a ZX Spectrum 48K, which allows the Enterprise to run the catalogue of thousands of Spectrum BASIC games and any other titles that don't access hardware directly; a hardware peripheral was available to provide more complete emulation for other Spectrum titles — catching Spectrum hardware accesses and issuing an interrupt so that emulation software can deal with them.

An external floppy drive became available later, and allowed access to CP/M programs, while at the same time being compatible with the MS-DOS disc format and FAT12 file structure (sub-directories etc.).

== Software ==
=== System ROM ===
EXOS (Enterprise Expandable Operating System) is contained in the system ROM, and is based on "channels". All peripherals are accessed through channels, which allows the programs to treat all input and output devices identically. The system ROM also contains a full-screen editor, which doubles as a simple word processor. It can edit text files and BASIC programs, as well as programs written in other languages. The editor uses the joystick for cursor control.

=== IS-Basic ===
Enterprise does not include BASIC or any other programming language in its internal ROM, unlike most other home computers of the time. Its BASIC interpreter was supplied on a 16k ROM cartridge, and the language can be changed by switching the cartridge, a system similar to that of Acorn's BBC Micro.

IS-Basic adheres to the ANSI BASIC standard. It is a fully structured language whose wide set of control structures includes multi-line IF...THEN...ELSE, SELECT...CASE, DO...LOOP with WHILE and UNTIL conditions. The WHILE condition being at the begin and the UNTIL condition being at the end of the do-loop, and the ability to escape a loop with the EXIT LOOP statement. Procedures and functions can have both reference and value parameters, and local variables. Errors and other exceptions are handled with exception handlers.

IS-Basic has the unique ability to hold multiple programs simultaneously in memory. Each program has a separate set of global variables and line numbers, but the CHAIN statement makes it possible to call one program from another and pass parameters between them. Peripherals can be controlled directly from BASIC, so there is rarely a need to use POKE and PEEK statements. IS-Basic has the usual commands for drawing dots, lines, circles and ellipses and for filling areas, and supports Logo-style turtle graphics. Sound commands can be entered into a queue, and executed in the background while the program execution continues.

The basic was also noted as being long-winded, an example being the command to clear the screen was commonly abbreviated to CLS, on the enterprise the command was CLEAR SCREEN with no abbreviation possible.

=== Other software ===
Several languages besides IS-BASIC, including Forth, Lisp, Pascal and assembly, were available on either ROM cartridge or tape. Basic-to-Basic converters could convert BASIC programs written for other home computers. Some 40 games, from IS and other publishers, were listed in the catalog. IS-DOS, the CP/M compatible operating system, opened access to the wide range of CP/M programs available at that time.

== History ==
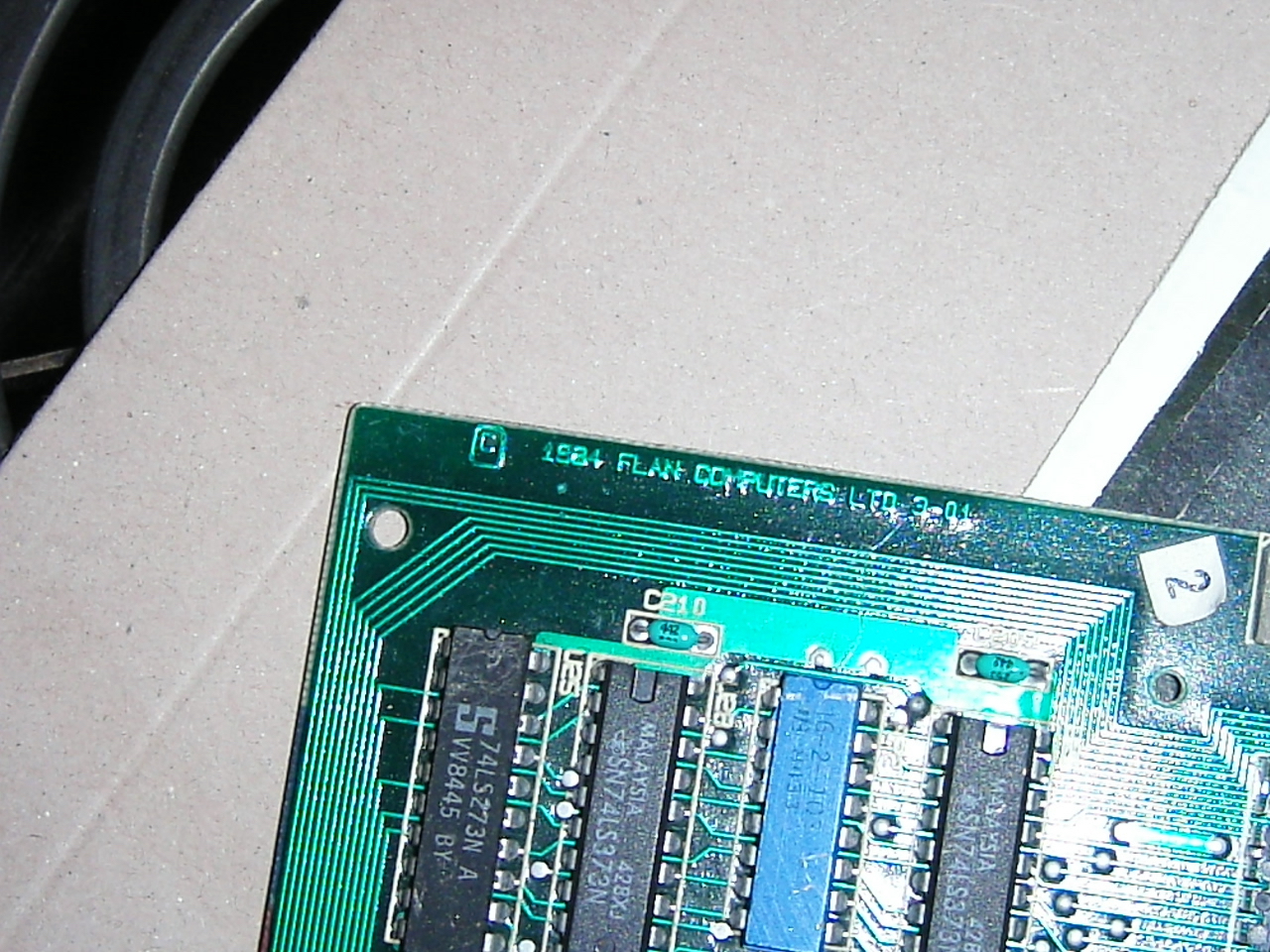
1984 'Flan Computers' seen on an Enterprise 64's motherboard

After the 1982 introduction of the ZX Spectrum, Hong Kong trading company Locumals commissioned Intelligent Software, headed by international chess player David Levy, to develop a home computer in the UK. During development the machine had the codename DPC, which stood for damp-proof course, to confuse potential competitors. The machine was also known by the names Samurai, Oscar, Elan and Flan before the Enterprise name was finally chosen. The succession of name changes was mainly due to the discovery of other machines and companies with the chosen name. The odd choice of Flan emerged following the discovery that Elan could not be used (due to complaints from Elan Digital Systems of Crawley) but some documentation had already been produced with that moniker and it was thought the Elan name could easily be modified on printed materials.

Entersoft, modelled after Amstrad's AMSOFT, was set up to ensure a steady supply of software for the new machine. Enterprise was announced to the press in September 1983, and some 80,000 machines were pre-ordered by the time of its April 1984 sales launch. The product did not ship until 1985, by which point the UK home computer market was already dominated by the ZX Spectrum, Commodore 64, Amstrad CPC and Acorn BBC Micro with the 16-bit era on the horizon. A successor machine, the PW360, was developed in 1986 to compete against the Amstrad PCW 8256, but the company was by then in severe financial difficulties, and closed down.

The home computer market had changed greatly from the time from the machine was announced to its release date. There had been a downturn, owing to market saturation. Large retailers proved reluctant to stock the machine, and smaller retailers were wary of stocking a machine not supported through the major retail channels. The hardware was still powerful for a home computer of the era, but there was a limited software catalogue and the price was higher than the competition. For example, the Amstrad CPC 464 included a monitor and cassette recorder, was released before the Enterprise, and retailed for less. After the initial manufacturing run of 80,000 units, it is believed that no further units were made, so the Enterprise is among the rarer home computers of the 1980s.

The Enterprise had only minor success in the UK, selling no more that 25,000 units in this region, but did go on to have more impact in other countries. Enterprise Computers UK and Intelligent Software collapsed by 1986 but a German subsidiary survived until 1997 and shipped remaining stock to various countries including Egypt, Kazakhstan and the Czech Republic but most notably to Hungary. The Hungarian company Videoton had produced a simplified version of the Enterprise called the Videoton TV Computer (TVC) under license that was mainly sold into Hungarian education. Hungary was then part of the Eastern Bloc which was subject to export controls and the TVC lacked the specialist Nick and Dave chips. Unsold Enterprise 128 stock though was imported into Hungary in 1987 (despite controls) and the machine became popular in the country, remaining on sale until around 1992. A dedicated cult following for the machine still exists in Hungary.

== Video games ==
Most of the video games for the system are hobbyist ports from ZX Spectrum, Amstrad CPC and a few from Videoton TV Computer. There are only 96 commercially released video games.

Title	Publisher	Release year
Abyss, The	Artificial Intelligence	1985
Adventure Quest	Level 9 Computing	1984
Airwolf	Elite Systems	1985
Alternative World Games	Novotrade	1990
Animal, Vegetable, Mineral	Bourne Educational	1985
Áttörés	Novotrade	
Batman	Ocean Software	1986
Beach Head	Dream Software	1985
Beatcha	Romik Software	1984
Bruce Lee	Ocean Software	1984
Bulldozer	Wave-8	
Caesar a cica	Novotrade	1989
Castle of Dreams	Widget Software	1985
Cauldron	Entersoft	1986
Centrum Ball	Novotrade	1987
Chains	Artificial Intelligence	1985
Colossal Adventure	Level 9 Computing	1985
Cross Road Race	a Studio	1988
Csavargás a gombák birodalmában	Octasoft	
Cyrus Chess II	Intelligent Chess Software Ltd.	1985
Devil's Lair	Loriciels	1985
Diamonds	Infosoft	1989
Dictator	Entersoft	1984
Digipók	Novotrade	1987
Dot breaker, Dot collector	Enterprise Computers	1987
Dungeon Adventure	Level 9 Computing	1984
Eat it up	Nielsen	1989
Eden Blues	Novosoft	1986
Eggs of Death	Novotrade	1985
Emerald Isle	Level 9 Computing	1985
Enterball	a Studio	1988
Enter-Stack	a Studio	1987
Fantasia Diamond	Hewson Consultants	1985
Fantomas	a Studio	1987
Fire	a Studio	1988
Five in a Row	Entersoft	1984
Games Pack 1 (Eddie the Exterminator, Windsurfer)	Entersoft	1984
Games Pack 2 (Bomb Squad, Death Diver)	Entersoft	1984
Games Pack 3 (Galaxians, Space Orbs)	Boxsoft	1986
Get Dexter	Infogrames	1985
Grid Trouble	Enterprise Computers	1987
Happy Letters	Bourne Educational	1985
Happy Numbers	Bourne Educational	1985
Heathrow ATC	Hewson Consultants	1984
Hopeless Game	F.T. Studio	
Hubert	Novotrade	
Hungaroring Forma 1	Novotrade	1987
Impossible Mission 2	Novotrade	1988
Jack's House of Cards	Romik Software	1985
Jammin	Enterprise Computers	1985
King of the Castle	Artificial Intelligence	1985
Körmöci Arany	a Studio	1988
Lands of Havoc	Microdeal	1985
Laser	a Studio	1989
Lords of Time	Level 9 Computing	1984
Magic Ball	Boxsoft	1987
Market, The	High Tech Software	1985
Mirror World	Novotrade	1986
Mordon's Quest	John Jones-Steele, Peter Moreland and Peter Donne	1985
Nautilus	Octasoft	1986
Newton almája	Octasoft	1987
Nodes of Yesod	Odin Computer Graphics	1985
Orient Express	Artificial Intelligence	1985
Out of This World	Boxsoft	1987
Pacman	Boxsoft	1986
Permolift	a Studio	1988
Playground (Adventure)	Widgit Software	1985
Poszeidón kincse	Novotrade	1989
R2-D2	Wave-8	1989
Rabló Rulett	Novotrade	1987
Race Ace	Artificial Intelligence	1985
Raid (over Moscow)	U.S. Gold	1985
Return to Eden	Level 9 Computing	1984
Reversi, Dáma, Awari	Novotrade	1987
RX-220	Novotrade	1989
Snowball	Level 9 Computing	1984
Sorcery	Virgin Games	1985
Space Bubble	Infosoft	1989
Space Pirate	Enterprise Computers	1987
Spanish Gold	Chalksoft	1985
Starstrike, 3D	Realtime Software	1984
Steve Davis Snooker	CDS Software	1985
Submarine Commander	Entersoft	1985
Super Pipeline 2	Enterprise Computers	1985
Tejútvesztő / Labyrinth	Novosoft	
Tetris	Boxsoft	1986
Tili-toli	Wave-8	1989
Tombs of Doom	Enterprise Computers	1985
Turbó Rudi	Novotrade	
Tutti Frutti	Wave-8	1988
Unicum	Wave-8	1988
Up & Down	a Studio	1989
Williamsburg Adventure 3	Microdeal	1985
Wizard's Lair	Bubble Bus	1985
Wordhang	Bourne Educational	1985
Wriggler	Romantic Robot	1985

== Enterprise emulators ==
- Clock Signal for macOS and Linux
- EP128Emu for Windows and Linux
- EP32 for Windows
- JSep - JavaScript Enterprise-128 emulator
