= Red Moon (video game) =

1985 video game

- Developer: Level 9
- Publisher: Mandarin Software
- Series: Time and Magik
- Platforms: Amiga, Amstrad CPC, Amstrad PCW, Atari 8-bit, Atari ST, BBC Micro, Commodore 64, MS-DOS, ZX Spectrum
- Release: 1985
- Genre: Interactive fiction
- Mode: Single-player

Red Moon is the second game in the Time and Magik trilogy.

== Gameplay ==
Red Moon Crystal, a powerful source of Magik, has been stolen and must be recovered to save the country of Baskalos from destruction.

== Reception ==
Reception

Award
Publication	Award
Crash	Smash!

John Sweeney for Page 6 said "Level 9 seem to have learnt how to cram an incredible amount into 32K. Red Moon has more than adequate descriptions of over 200 locations, scattered with over 50 items, and inhabited by no less than 19 different beings with whom you can interact."

Peter Sweasey for Home Computing Weekly said "Although Level 9 can do better, even an average game by them is excellent by other people's standards."

"The Pilgrim" for Amstrad Action said "Level 9 have had a consistent reputation for good games, and Red Moon is one of the best, if not THE best."

Derek Brewster for Crash said "Red Moon is a highly competent adventure program which neatly walks the tightrope between absorbing plot and commercial, memory-guzzling colourful graphics."

Ken Matthews for Commodore Horizons said "Red Moon is enchanting – the plot is original even if the idea of hit point has been seen before – Level 9 is still the best in Britain."

John Minson for Popular Computing Weekly said "Red Moon is so richly written by David Williamson and Pete Austin that it makes the term 'interactive novel' seem almost credible."

"Miss Adventure" for Your 64 said "make no mistake, this is a great game. Great descriptions, OK graphics and a magical scenario in every sense."

Sean Masterson for Amtix said "I have no criticisms worth mentioning when it comes to this game; it's a perfect example of how to write a graphic adventure. No gimmicks, fast, intelligent."

John Ransley for Commodore User said "Level 9 never seems to produce a bad product and indeed the ability of Pete Austin and Co to produce three superb graphic adventures this year alone is itself verging on sorcery."

The game won the award for best adventure game of the year in Crash magazine, and the game was voted best adventure game of the year at the Golden Joystick Awards.
