= Lancelot (video game) =

1988 video game

- UK cover art
- Developer: Level 9
- Publisher: Mandarin Software
- Platforms: Amiga, Amstrad CPC, Amstrad PCW, Atari 8-bit, Atari ST, BBC Micro, Commodore 64, MS-DOS, ZX Spectrum
- Release: 1988
- Genre: Interactive fiction
- Mode: Single-player

Lancelot is a text adventure by Level 9 released in 1988. It has static graphics on some platforms. The plot focuses on Lancelot's quest to find the Holy Grail.

== Plot ==
Designed by Peter Austin with in-game text by Christina Erskine and Peter McBride, Lancelot describes the adventures of Sir Lancelot as recounted in Sir Thomas Malory's Le Morte d'Arthur. Like other interactive fiction releases from Level 9 such as Scapeghost, gameplay is divided into three parts. Lancelot's overall objectives are to complete the Order of the Knights of the Round Table and ultimately to recover the Holy Grail. The lore drawn from Arthurian legend allows for a vast range of familiar settings (such as Camelot, Tintagel, and Winchester) and characters (like Merlin, Arthur, Guenever, and Lancelot's son Galahad). As Lancelot grows in power and completes quests, several knights and ladies accompany him on his travels, and many of these non-player characters can be controlled by providing instructions through the game's parser. These supporting characters include the Damosel Maledisant, Sir Bors de Ganis, Sir Ector de Maris, Sir Tristram, and several others.

Lancelot's first challenge is to face the Black Knight in combat. If he is merciful with him, Lancelot learns that the knight is really the disguised King Arthur, who invites Lancelot to become part of his order of knights. At his knighting the next day, Lancelot discovers his feelings for Guenever, and seeks to prove his worth to her. Arthur tasks Lancelot with scouring the kingdom to recover several lost knights, including Sir Meliot, Sir Lamorak, Sir Bors, and Sir Gawain, many of whom are held captive by rebel lords. To prove his honor, Lancelot must only engage in combat when provoked. The final stage of the story sees Lancelot setting off from Castle Vagon with Sir Galahad in search of the Holy Grail.

== Reception ==
- Sinclair User: "... up to the usual high standard we have come to expect from Level 9..."
- The Micro User: "Lancelot has just got to be Game of the Year for me".
