= Knight Orc =

1987 video game

- Cover art
- Developer: Level 9
- Publisher: Rainbird Software
- Engine: KAOS
- Platforms: Amiga, Amstrad CPC, Atari 8-bit, Atari ST, BBC Micro, Commodore 64, MS-DOS, ZX Spectrum, Mac, MSX
- Release: 1987
- Genre: Interactive fiction
- Mode: Single-player

Knight Orc is a text adventure game released in 1987 by Level 9, with limited graphics on some platforms. It comes with a short novella by Peter McBride ("The Sign of the Orc") explaining the background to the story.

== Plot ==
NPCs go about their lives while the player tries to solve the main quest (Atari ST screenshot)

After a night of heavy drinking with friends, Grindleguts the orc awakes to find himself strapped to a horse and about to joust with a human knight. His "friends" are nowhere to be seen, and he must somehow escape from his predicament and get even with them. Grindleguts must survive in a world of hostile humans while seeking revenge against his tormentors.

After the first chapter, the game switches to a science fiction setting, where Grindleguts is revealed to be a malfunctioning non-player character in a futuristic massively multiplayer online role-playing game. Using his power of transitioning between fantasy and reality, he convinces several other bots to join him, and escapes from the simulated reality facility.

== Gameplay ==
The game is a text adventure with limited graphics on some systems. Gameplay is similar to the later Level 9 adventure Gnome Ranger, which uses the same game engine (KAOS). The game flows in real time; each person and creature goes on about their daily lives and follows their schedule. The player must explore the settings while collecting useful items and interacting with various non-player characters to solve puzzles and problems.

== Reception ==
Reception

Awards
Publication	Award
Crash	Crash Smash
Sinclair User	SU Classic

Sinclair User had this to say:

"Knight Orc is no ordinary adventure. Oh no, this is a multi-user adventure ... only the other players are simulated. One nice touch is the little bits that are added on to the end of descriptions which tell you what the other players are doing, such as 'Somewhere, a male voice cries out "Has anyone got any spare treasure?"' ... The location descriptions are exquisite and more than make up for the absence of graphics ... The humour worked into the text is like something out of a Douglas Adams novel, quick-fire and very enjoyable. Never droll... But the high spot of the game is the interactive characters... All have their own characters and their own goal to complete. And, the one thing they all have in common is that they all hate Orcs... Technically The Pawn may be superior, but in plot, enjoyment and atmosphere Knight Orc wins hands down."

Computer Gaming World stated that the graphics were a waste of disk space and the puzzles were "uneven". However, the excellent parser and other virtues resulted in an "above average" game.

Your Computer magazine said it was "Disappointing", while the Atari magazine Page 6 said it was excellent value for money about the Atari 8-bit version.

Computer and Video Games gave Knight Orc the C+VG HIT! award, praising the story and the unique protagonist perspective, additionally noting that the accompanying novella, The Sign of the Orc, is "a good read in its own right."
