= Colossal Adventure =

1982 video game

- Publisher: Level 9 Computing
- Platform: Nascom
- Release: 1982
- Genre: Adventure

Colossal Adventure is a text based adventure game published by Level 9 Computing in 1982. It was originally released for the Nascom.

== Gameplay ==
Colossal Adventure is an expanded version of the original Adventure by Will Crowther and Don Woods. Over 70 additional locations were added.

== Development and release ==
Opening screen of Colossal Adventure for MS-DOS

Colossal Adventure was the first commercial game from Level 9.

It was later released as the first game in the Jewels of Darkness trilogy.

== Reception ==
Allan J. Palmer for Page 6 said "Great Scott (Adams?)! Level 9 Computing have a winner here in this excellent rendition of the original Crowther/Woods mainframe Adventure game."

Steve Cooke for Personal Computer Games said "Although by contrast with some programs available on other machines this program looks a little dated, it shines out like a star in an empty sky as far as Lynx owners are concerned."

John Conquest for Big K said "Even by Level 9's present standards, Colossal Adventure is not the best game available, nor the most engrossing, the most difficult, the most fun, or indeed the most anything."

Stuart Menges for Acorn User said "Colossal Adventure is one of the best in its class. I would recommend it to any adventurer." Philip Garritt for Acorn User said "The program [...] is good value and will give many hours of entertainment."

What MSX? said "Level 9 is the number one software house for adventures, and this is the number one title. MSX owners start here."

Micro Adventurer referred to the game as a "first-class version" of the original Adventure, while Amstrad Action said "it's still the best and lengthiest version of this text-only classic available for a micro".

Crash considered the game "Recommended."

A retrospective review in The Spectrum Show said "If you want the granddaddy of all adventures, this is the one to get, closely followed by the Abersoft one that was bought by Melbourne House and released as Classic Adventure."
