= Adventure Quest =

Adventure Quest may refer to the following games:

- AdventureQuest (computer game), an online single-player RPG developed by Artix Entertainment in 2002
- Adventure Quest (Level 9 game), a fantasy text adventure game developed by Level 9 Computing in 1983
