= Champion of the Raj =

1991 turn-based strategy video game

- Atari ST cover art
- Developer: Level 9 Computing
- Publisher: Personal Software Services
- Series: Strategic Wargames
- Platforms: Amiga, Atari ST, MS-DOS
- Release: UK: 1991
- Genre: Turn-based strategy
- Mode: Single-player

Champion of the Raj is a turn-based strategy video game developed by Level 9 Computing and published by Personal Software Services. It was released exclusively in the United Kingdom for the Amiga, Atari ST, and IBM PC compatibles in 1991. It is the thirteenth and final instalment in the Strategic Wargames series. The game revolves around European imperialism and colonialism in India. Six factions–British, French, Mogul, Sikhs, Gurkhas, and Marathas–fight to gain overall control of India.

The core of the gameplay is focused on strategy, in which the player must conquer all territories of India through diplomatic or offensive means. It also contains action sequences, including traditional elephant racing and big-game hunting. Critics praised its colourful graphics and storyline, but strongly disliked the long load times and frequent disk swapping.

== Gameplay ==
In this screenshot, a French consul is planning to invade sections of British India.

Champion of the Raj is a turn-based strategy game which revolves around colonialism in India. Before starting the game, the player must pick a player-character and the respective faction they wish to side with. The choices include a viceroy of the British East India Company, a consul of the French East India Company, a Mogul emperor, a Maharajah of the Maruthrad, chief of the Gurkhas, or a Maharajah of the Sikhs. At the beginning of the game, the player-character is kidnapped by an assassin and is imprisoned inside a prison cell. A woman soon frees the player, and informs them of their task to either conquer India or persuade rival political factions to unite through diplomacy. The game begins in the year 1800, when the Mogul empire lost control of India. The majority of the game is presented through an in-game headquarters screen which displays a map of India, a book detailing information about individual Indian states, and a group of icons which allow the player to issue commands.

If the player wishes to take over a territory through diplomatic means, they must initiate dialogue with the local leader. If the player has a high enough popularity, the local leader may invite them to a sporting event, such as an elephant race or a game hunting session, which will give the player an opportunity to unite that territory under their faction. If the player's popularity is not high enough, they may hold a Durbar festival in an attempt to impress the local leaders. If diplomacy fails, the player has the option to invade any territory by force. Soldiers can be hired through payments of gold; however, if the player does not have a sufficient amount of gold at the end of the turn, a rebellion may start. Rebellions will sometimes initiate lethal encounters with assassins, in which the player must defend themselves through sword combat. Additionally, the player can bring assassins to their side by successfully launching an attack on their temple. The game ends once either all of the territories are united, or the player-character is assassinated.

== Reception ==
Reception

Review scores
Publication	Score
The One for ST Games	78%
ST Format	78%
CU Amiga	70%
Amiga Power	57%
Advanced Computer Entertainment	27%

The game received mixed reviews upon release. Gordon Houghton of The One for ST Games disliked the arcade sequences in the game, stating that they are "a waste of disk loading time", despite acknowledging its way of giving the strategy genre a wider appeal. Ed Ricketts of ST Format stated that despite its simplicity, the game was "enjoyable" to play. Fiona Keating of CU Amiga praised the game's entertaining storyline and colourful graphics, but criticised its sound, labeling it a "shortcoming". Jonathan Davies of Amiga Power criticised the simplicity of the gameplay, stating that despite the "impressive" graphics, the game "was not meant for a few minutes of playtime". Gary White of Advanced Computer Entertainment heavily criticised the visuals, stating that it had an "appalling" presentation and poor sound quality.

The disk loading time was the most criticised aspect from reviewers. Houghton found the loading times "hefty" and recommended that the player use two disk drives instead of one, as constant disk swapping was required in the game. Ricketts similarly found the swapping of "half a dozen" floppy disks a "nightmare" on the Atari ST. Keating found the "huge" amount of disk swapping to be the game's largest drawback, as well as the long loading times that accompanied it. Davies stated that scrolling times were "painfully slow" due to the excessive disk accessing. White stated that the game had a disk access routine "so bad" that it was almost impossible to access icons during gameplay, as the cursor movement was always a second behind actual mouse movements.
