= Head Coach v3 =

1988 video game

- Developer: C S Adams
- Publisher: Coda Software
- Platforms: Atari ST, BBC Micro
- Release: 1988
- Genre: Sports

Head Coach v3 is a 1988 video game published by Coda Software.

== Gameplay ==
Head Coach is a game in which the player is the head coach of an American football team, taking them through the season to get to the Super Bowl. The player is the coach of a fictional team called the Schoburg Franklins.

== Reception ==
John Harrington reviewed Head Coach for Games International magazine, and gave it a rating of 6 out of 10, and stated that "It is gratifying to see a small British software company come up with a reasonable sport simulation, and although the game will probably pall after a few seasons it should maintain its appeal long enough to get gridiron junkies through the baseball season."

Desmond for The Micro User wrote that the game is "fascinating and good fun - excellent tor bringing out the emotions" and quipped that not many games get him emotional enough to shout at the screen the way this one did.

Damon Howarth for Page 6 recommended the game to anyone with any interest in American football, commenting that anyone who wants to "use your computer in conjunction with your brain rather than just a picture gallery" may be interested in this program.
