= Return to Eden (video game) =

Text-based video game

Return to Eden was the second game in the Silicon Dreams Trilogy, a series of text adventure games featuring the player in the character of "Kim Kimberly" by Level 9 Computing. It is the sequel to Snowball. In this game, secret agent Kim Kimberly is mistakenly accused of being the saboteur from the first game. Kimberly escapes justice aboard the Snowball spaceship and becomes the first human being to land on the planet Eden.

Commodore 64 screenshot of Return to Eden

== Plot ==
With the Snowball 9 orbiting Eden, the surviving crew members put Kim on trial. The only evidence against her is the "mempak" from the control room, which shows her as the hijacker rather than the saviour. Despite the fact that the recording is damaged and thus is unreliable, they sentence her to death. About to be thrown into space, Kim manages to escape aboard a "stratoglider" and an hour later, lands on Eden. At this point the game starts.

The first thing the player must do is find a shelter for Kim, because a few moves into the game the Snowball 9 crew use the ship's engine to try to burn her down. The native robots take this as proof that the Snowball 9 is not the ship they were expecting but a hostile alien craft they must destroy. The objective is to contact the robots before time ends for the Snowball 9 and everyone aboard it.

== Development ==
Unlike its predecessor, Return to Eden only had about two hundred and fifty locations, but it was Level 9's first game to feature graphics. Other adventure games had included graphics before, but version 2 of the A-Code system allowed Level 9 to encode location graphics into as little as forty bytes. This size made it possible to add graphics to every location of the game for all formats with more than 32 K RAM. The user could choose not to display them and play the game in text-only mode. It was released for the same platforms as its predecessor.

The game's first cover depicted a robot fighting a monster plant in Enoch. The robot resembled a comic book character, so to avoid legal troubles, Level 9 commissioned Godfrey Dowson to do a new cover. Dowson's illustration depicted another robot in the jungle looking towards Enoch. They liked the second cover so much, they hired Dowson to do artwork for the re-release of their old games as well as for their future titles.

Pete Austin commented on the game: "It's an alien theme park gone wild. The Eden universe is more like Larry Niven's future space", and "intended as a comment on superpower intervention in the Third World."

== Reception ==
Home Computing Weekly said "Overall, excellent value which, in my view, is unsurpassed by any other software house in this country. Buy it an enjoy."

Amstrad Computer User said "Pity there wasn’t any sound, perhaps there was no room left for it."

Personal Computer Games said "The more adventures tee have that reflect real-fife problems like this the belter in my view."

Computer and Video Games said "Return to Eden is of a high standard and will, I think, turn out to have the same depth as its forerunner. Snowball."

Derek Brewster of Crash said "Return to Eden is a very worthy successor to the highly acclaimed Snowball. Far from being just another follow up, it is a new and exciting program in its own right and has many features which keep Level 9 at the top of intelligent science fiction computer exploration."

Richard Price of Sinclair User said "Exhausted compulsives of the firm's other works may just as well admit to themselves now that they probably won't be sleeping much for the next few months. Atmospheric and original."

Tony Kendle of Popular Computing Weekly said "With the arrival of this range. Amstrad owners already have the pick of the best text adventures."

Your 64 said "The game supports a large vocabulary and the programmer's fine sense of humour is more than evident. Thoroughly enjoyable ... and highly recommended!"

Return to Eden received a 90% score in Sinclair Programs.
