= Elephant racing =

Elephant racing, though unusual as a sporting event, is held in many parts of the world but mostly in Asia. The earliest known such racing event as a tradition is reported from Vietnam. In the 20th century, this became a major event (though it generated protests) in Germany in 1920, and an organized International Elephant Race in Nepal from tourism interests in 1982.

Elephant racing is a popular form of animal racing in Afghanistan. A straight and long trunk is an important factor in the race for the elephants to cross the finish line. The races take a longer time than those involving horses but the animals are clearly visible to every spectator.

== In Vietnam ==
The Buon Don Elephant Races are held as a traditional event in the Central Highlands of the Buon Don district of Vietnam, which is well known for its elephant trainers. The skills of elephant trainers are used to perpetuate the heritage of holding elephant races every year during the third lunar month (generally in March) of the year. The race course, in the forests of the banks of the Sevepoi River, is a mile long track wide enough to accommodate nine participating elephants. Elephants are entered into the races from many villages. Two mahouts or jockeys ride on each elephant - one to steer it and another to goad it to race fast. A musical instrument made of horns of the elephants is blown first to assemble the elephants at the starting gate, then another sound is blown to signal the elephants to take the starting line and be set for the race, and with the third blow of the horn, the race is signalled. The elephants generally race at a speed of 25 mph with the public cheering for their favourite elephants. The first elephant crossing the winning post is given a wreath as an award, and also fed with bananas and sugar cane. After the event, the elephants celebrate by taking a swim in the river.

A major festival is held at Wat Phou, every year in March, when elephant racing is a traditional popular sport event.

== In Germany and India ==
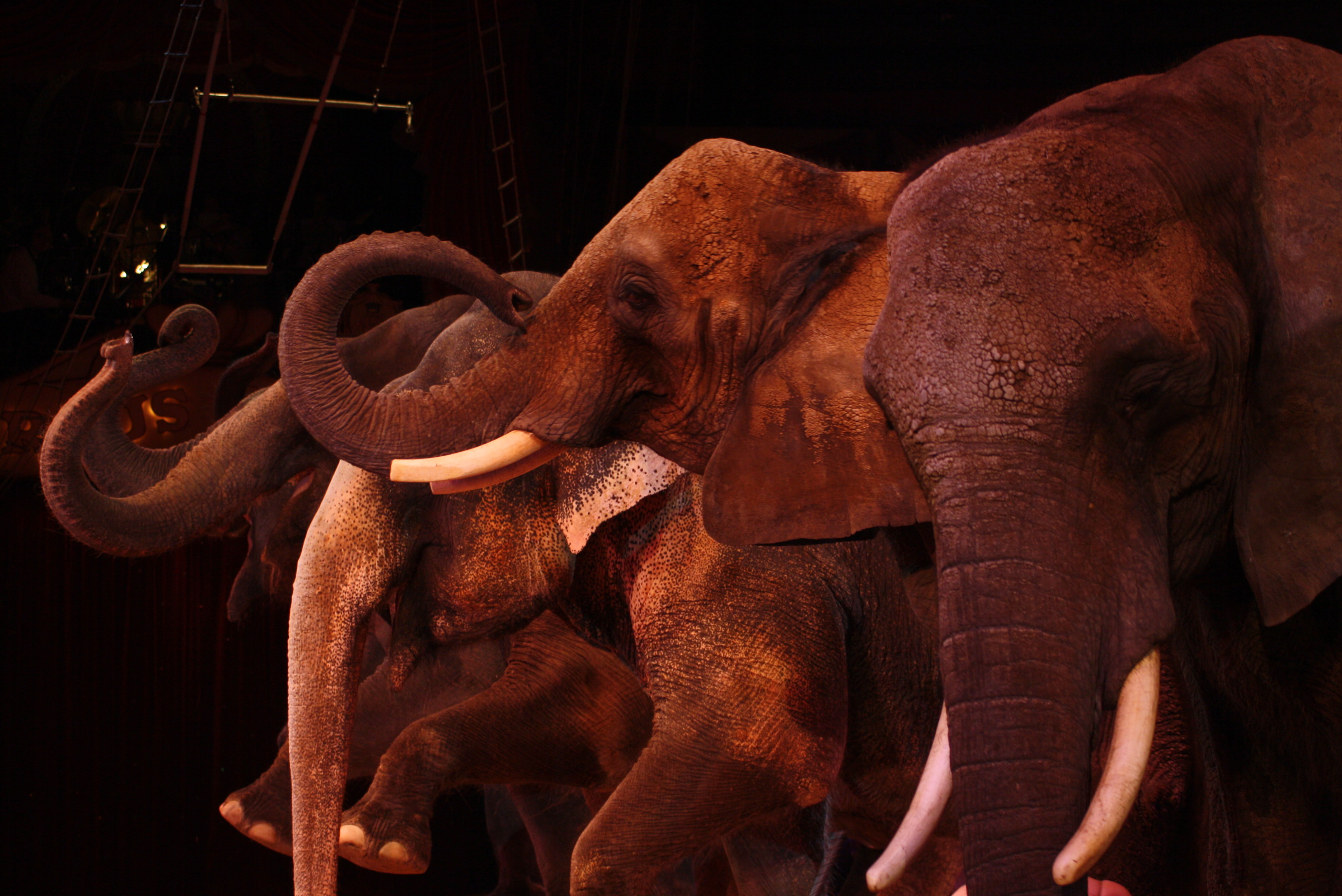
Circus elephants in Germany used for racing

In the year 2000, at the initiative of Ravindra Gujjula, an Indian born Mayor of Altlandsberg town, near Berlin organized an elephant race at Hoppegarten, which was very successful as more than 40,000 people witnessed the race. 14 circus elephants (equal numbers from Asia and Africa) participated and the race card consisted of six race events. The contention of the sponsors was that the elephants enjoyed the racing event. At the end of the race, elephants were fed with fruits and vegetables.

The race turned into a controversial issue, particularly in India, as environmental and religious lobbies objected to this racing. It is a protected species in India, and in Hinduism it represents the elephant-headed God Ganesha. Members of the Animal Peace group's protest was supported by leading personalities like Maneka Gandhi, the then Minister for Social Affairs in India, Nina Hagen, the German rock singer, and Brigitte Bardot, the French film actress. In India, only two states hold the event.

== In Nepal ==
In Nepal, the race started as an International Elephant Race in December 2005. The Tharu people of Nepal, who are professional tamers of wild elephants, ride the race elephants. A particular feature of this race is that riders of racing elephants are chosen by lottery and not by choice and this makes the riding difficult for the jockeys who train on their favourite particular elephants. The winning elephant is awarded a trophy. The racing track is of 900 feet (270 m) in length. Heats or elimination rounds, with six elephants in each heat, are involved before the final race is held. A video film documented by Reuters has recorded that the elephants move fast on the chosen straight route, which is flanked by spectators. The Chitwan reserve is a venue for such races, and also for elephant polo and pageants, which are also part of this tourist oriented race. Champakali is the name of the race elephant which won the race in successive years. On this occasion, a soccer match between baby elephants is also an attraction.
