= Gnome Ranger =

1987 video game

- Developer: Level 9 Computing
- Publisher: Level 9
- Designer: Peter Austin
- Programmer: Mike Austin
- Artist: Godfrey Dowson
- Engine: KAOS
- Platforms: Amiga, Amstrad CPC, Amstrad PCW, Macintosh, Atari 8-bit, Atari ST, BBC Micro, MSX, Commodore 64, MS-DOS, ZX Spectrum
- Release: 1987
- Genre: Adventure
- Mode: Single-player

Gnome Ranger is a graphic adventure game designed by Peter Austin and released by Level 9 in 1987. A still image is shown for each location, and the player enters text commands to move or interact. Ports to the Apple II and Atari 8-bit computers are text-only. A sequel was published in 1988: Ingrid's Back.

== Plot ==
The gnome Ingrid Bottomlow has displeased her family by her un-gnomelike behavior, such as going off to university and getting an education. She has been teleported from her village by a faulty scroll, and has to find her way back.

== Gameplay ==
The game's parser allows the player to perform complex tasks (Atari ST screenshot).

The game is a text adventure with limited graphics on some systems. It comes with a short novella by Peter McBride ("The Gnettlefield Journal") explaining Ingrid's predicament and setting the background to the story. Gameplay is similar to the earlier Level 9 adventure Knight Orc, which uses the same game engine (KAOS). The player must explore the settings while collecting useful items and interacting with various non-player characters to solve puzzles and problems.

The game takes place in three areas, each characterized by the non-player characters Ingrid will meet. The first contains characters of an animal nature, the second of a vegetable nature, and the third of a mineral nature.

== Reception ==
Gnome Ranger received mostly positive reviews. Atari ST User magazine reviewer rated it 9/10 points overall, concluding: "I am convinced it is Level 9's best ever. It is funny, well-plotted, teasing, very friendly, but powerful, literate and big". Similarly, the review for ACE magazine also ended on a positive note: "Gnome Ranger has improved on Knight Orc in the puzzle stakes (more logical and enjoyable), the atmosphere (more enjoyable and less confusing), the plot (more comprehensible), and the characters (more interesting). You can't ask for much more than that".
