= Fantasia Diamond =

1984 video game

- Developer: Kim Topley
- Publisher: Hewson Consultants
- Platforms: Amstrad CPC, Acorn Electron, ZX Spectrum, BBC Micro
- Release: 1984
- Genre: Interactive fiction
- Mode: Single-player

Fantasia Diamond is a text adventure game by Kim Topley and published by Hewson Consultants. It was released in 1984 for the Amstrad CPC, Acorn Electron, ZX Spectrum and BBC Micro home computers. Unusually for Hewson, it was not released on the Commodore 64 with the game's author stating when asked "The answer to your question is simply that I didn't own a C64 at the time".

== Plot ==
The game takes place in no specific setting, combining some elements of fantasy such as elves and other magical creatures with more modern elements such as a prominent robot NPC. The story is that many years ago, an ancestor of the player embarked on a courageous journey to a faraway kingdom where they discovered what is considered to be the largest diamond in the world, the Fantasia Diamond. This priceless heirloom was passed down from generation to generation, despite all manner of thieves that attempted to steal it for themselves. Although it was safe for generations, thieves were finally successful in taking the diamond from the player's home and whisking it away to a large castle on the other side of a river. To retrieve it, the master spy Boris was dispatched, but he was captured and is being held prisoner. Now, the only way to recover the diamond is for the player go into the castle themselves, attempt to retrieve the diamond, free Boris the master spy from his prison, and safely return home.

== Gameplay ==
Fantasia Diamond is a text adventure interspersed with simple graphics. The player must explore, find items, talk to NPCs, find a way into the castle and ultimately retrieve the diamond and rescue Boris. During the course of the game, the character will encounter both friendly and hostile creatures that can be given simple typed instructions that they may or may not agree to follow. At certain points during the game the player is required to coax these characters to perform certain actions that otherwise cannot be performed themselves, which can be quite tricky given the way the characters move randomly and sometimes refuse to obey instructions. The player must also constantly search for food and drink to stay alive. If the player becomes too weak from lack of nourishment, then certain tasks such as picking up heavy objects becomes impossible. The player becomes weakened over time, as well as through sustaining injuries in combat.

== Reception ==
Reception

Award
Publication	Award
Crash	Crash Smash

CRASH magazine: "Fantasia Diamond is a long adventure with many interesting and logical problems to solve. Highly recommended."
