= Silicon Dreams =

Trilogy of video games from 1983 to 1985

- Developer: Level 9 Computing
- Publishers: NA: Firebird; EU: Rainbird
- Designers: Snowball; Nick Austin, Mike Austin and Pete Austin with additional help from Ian Buxton. Art by Tim Noyce; Return to Eden; Nick Austin and Chris Queen with art by Tim Noyce; The Worm in Paradise; Nick Austin, Mike Austin and Pete Austin with art by James Horsler
- Platforms: Amiga, Amstrad CPC, Amstrad PCW, Apple II, Atari 8-bit, Atari ST, BBC Micro, Commodore 64, MS-DOS, Classic Mac OS, MSX, ZX Spectrum
- Release: 1983 (Snowball); 1984 (Return to Eden); 1985 (The Worm in Paradise); 1986 (Silicon Dreams)
- Genre: Interactive fiction
- Mode: Single-player

Silicon Dreams is a trilogy of interactive fiction games developed by Level 9 Computing during the 1980s. The first game was Snowball, released during 1983, followed a year later by Return to Eden, and then by The Worm in Paradise during 1985. The next year they were vended together as the first, second and last of the Silicon Dreams.

As with most Level 9 games, the trilogy used an interpreted language termed A-code and was usable in all major types of home computer of the time, on either diskette or cassette. Level 9 self-published each game separately, but the compilation was published by Telecomsoft, which sold it in the United States with the tradename Firebird and in Europe with the tradename Rainbird.

The trilogy is set in a not too-distant future when humans have started colonising space. For the first two instalments the player has the role of Kim Kimberley, an undercover agent, whose goal in Snowball is to save the colonist's spacecraft from crashing into a star, and in Return to Eden to stop the defence system at the destination planet of Eden from destroying the craft. In The Worm in Paradise, the player, with the role of an unnamed citizen of Eden, must travel around the city of Enoch, learn its secrets, earn money and save the planet.

== Gameplay ==
The games use a text parser for entering commands at the "What now?" prompt. The parser can interpret more than a thousand words to control movement or actions. It looks at the command, picking out two or three words it knows, ignoring the order, and tries to guess what is meant. For movement, the usual commands for moving 'NORTH', 'SOUTH', 'EAST' and 'WEST' are available (and their abbreviated forms of 'N', 'S', 'E' and 'W') as well as 'UP' and 'DOWN' ('U' and 'D' respectively) and a number of other directions and 'modes' of movement (like 'JUMP'). For actions, it understands how to pick up objects, opening doors, lighting lamps, as well as dropping objects and wielding them. Additionally, there are commands to invoke 'SAVE' and 'RESTORE' of game positions to cassette tape or floppy disk (for some systems also to RAM), ask for 'HELP', turn off pictures and turn them on again with 'WORDS' and 'PICTURES' respectively, an 'OOPS' command to undo previous commands.

Silicon Dreams can be played as three separate games, but to obtain a maximum score the games must be completed in order, carrying the score from one adventure to the next. Points are not scored for collecting treasures, but rather for doing specific tasks helping to satisfy the goal of the individual game. For Snowball the goal is to get to the main control room and prevent the starship Snowball 9 from crashing into a star. For Return to Eden the goal is to get into the city of Enoch and stop the robots from destroying Snowball 9. And for Worm in Paradise the goal is to find as much information about the city as possible, obtain money, and then become a member of the governing party of Eden, saving the planet in the process.

== Setting ==
The trilogy is set in the future, when the human race is colonizing the stars. A transport network has been developed for the entire Solar System using accelerator chains, and the "Big 5" nations of Earth have initiated a plan to colonise the galaxy. This is known as the Terran Expansionary Phase. It lasted ninety years from 2120 to 2210.

The first major activity was to launch probes into outer space. The probes reported any Earth-sized planet they encountered during their centuries-long voyage. Each probe was followed by a survey ship ten years later. The ship's mission was to map the planet and, if it was habitable, it would signal Earth and then, while waiting for the colonists to arrive, terraform the planet.

This is the second part of the phase. The survey ship mined materials from asteroids and used them to build a robot factory in space – a process that could take decades. The resulting robots built more space factories that in turn produced better robots. They also built large satellite dishes to collect data sent from Earth containing the latest technological advances. Then terraforming was performed. The robots landed on the planet and built cities while also launching more probes and survey ships further into space.

Once Earth received news of a habitable planet, the third and final part was done. Ten giant passenger discs, each carrying two hundred thousand colonists in stasis, were towed into space. Next came the engine unit, which was linked to the front of the discs, and then the colony ship was completed and ready to go.

During the 2190s fifty colony ships were launched from the EEC's Ceres base, among them the Snowball 9, which carried the first colonists for planet Eden on the Eridani A system. For the next three years, the accelerator chains beyond Pluto fired ten-ton blocks of ammonia ice at the travelling ship. The Snowball 9 caught the ice blocks with hooks and piled it around the passenger discs, forming a hollow shell that would cover most of the ship and would serve as a shield until it was needed to fuel the fusion engines on the later part of the trip. This ice shell gave the Snowball series its name.

After receiving the last ice block, the crew put the ship in autopilot and went to hibernate with the passengers, leaving the ship's maintenance to robots. Except for a brief period of activity to start deceleration, the crew slept for most of the trip, awaking one year before reaching Eden. The plan was to continue deceleration while consuming the last of the ice shell, and then put the ship in orbit around the planet, delivering the passengers down by gliders that would be retrieved by hooks to be reused.

=== Kim Kimberley ===
The protagonist of the two first instalments, Kim Kimberley, is a tall, athletic, intelligent woman with brown eyes and fair hair. She was born and raised at Hampstead Crèche, which was closed when she was thirteen years old due to violations of the Android Protection Acts. She finished her education at the Milton Keynes School of Life in Malta, then returned to England for National Service. She started doing standard security work with the occasional surveillance of subversive members of society, but ended working as a counter-espionage agent. Whilst in her mid-twenties, Kim accepted to travel undercover on the Snowball 9 to be there as the last resort for the worst-case scenario.

== Snowball ==
Commodore 64 screen copy of Snowball as it appears in the expanded version of Silicon Dreams.

=== Plot ===
As the Snowball 9 approaches Eden, something goes wrong. A crew member murders her shipmates, destroys the communication system and sets the ship on a collision course with the sun. The robots, being little more than automata, continue their everyday operations oblivious to the danger but the ship's computer, capable of thinking, awakens Kim Kimberley before the deranged crew member destroys it. She exits her modified stasis chamber with the goal of finding a way to reach the control room and avert disaster.

=== Development ===
Snowball was originally released during 1983 as the company's fourth adventure game using the A-Code system. Nick, Mike, and Pete Austin headed development. Though Level 9's previous games featured a fantasy theme, the Austin brothers chose a science fiction theme. The original release used version 1 of this system and was initially released for the BBC Micro, ZX Spectrum, and Nascom, but was later followed by versions for the Commodore 64, Camputers Lynx, Oric-1, Atari 8-bit computers as well as for the Memotech MTX, Amstrad CPC, Enterprise and MSX. It is noteworthy for including over seven thousand locations. To achieve this sixty-eight hundred locations on the passenger disks form a colour-coded maze with minimal descriptions.

In an interview for Sinclair User, Chris Bourne asked, "Is the androgynous Kim a man or woman?" Pete Austin pointed out that "there's a credit at the end for the design of 'Ms Kimberley's costume,'" but also admitted that Kim Kimberley was "a deliberately unisex name." The debate came to an end with the release of Return to Eden, where it was made more explicit that Kim was not a man, because the surviving crew members confuse her with the woman who tried to destroy the ship.

== The trilogy ==
Silicon Dreams was the second title published by Telecomsoft, the first being Jewels of Darkness, in a four-game publishing deal signed by Level 9 during April 1986. This deal gave Level 9 (which was often referred to as "British Infocom") an opportunity to revise their previous titles and add support for the 16-bit market as well as a possible entry into the potential lucrative US market. Subsequently, the trilogy was released for a total of twelve platforms, leaving out the BBC Micro and Enterprise compared to The Worm in Paradise, but adding support for the Apple II, Amiga, Amstrad PCW, Atari ST, BM PC MS-DOS and Mac. All the games were updated to version 3 of the A-Code system with updated text and new graphics for inclusion in the release of the Silicon Dreams trilogy in 1986 with expanded, text-only versions for some releases.

The "Rainbird" release came in a 215 x 153 x 27 mm cardboard box while the "Firebird" release came in a 227 x 163 x 30 mm black, plastic box. Both featured a 150 x 210 mm, 68-page booklet with loading instructions, a guide to playing the game and Peter McBride's novella Eden Song which served as an introduction to The Worm in Paradise. The novella was also used as a copy protection device, from which, upon restore of a saved game, the player had to enter a word from a page and line reference.

Level 9 never released a version of the trilogy for the Sinclair QL.

== Reception ==
The games were released individually and generally received good initial reviews. Snowball won the Best Text-only Adventure prize at Crash 1984 Readers Awards, Return to Eden received a 90% score in Sinclair Programs, and The Worm in Paradise was rated a Your Sinclair Megagame and a Sinclair User Classic.

When the trilogy was released it received unanimously good reviews from the ZX Spectrum press. Sinclair User gave it a Sinclair User Classic, terming it an "unqualified success for Level 9 and Rainbird." Your Sinclair awarded a Your Sinclair Mega Game, and ZX Computing a Monster Hit. The Commodore 64 magazine Zzap!64 gave it a 90% score which awarded it with a Zzap!64 Sizzler. However, some reviews found the graphics "truly abysmal. Blotchy, often unrecognisable...simple in design..." while others called it "smidgens better than those added to Jewel of Darkness, possibly even two smidgens, and are far from being the disappointment."

The ZX Spectrum version was placed fourth in September and third in October 1987 of the Your Sinclair adventure charts.
