= Ingrid's Back =

1988 video game

- Developer: Level 9
- Publisher: Level 9
- Platforms: Amiga, Amstrad CPC, Amstrad PCW, Atari 8-bit, Atari ST, Commodore 64, MS-DOS, ZX Spectrum, BBC Micro, MSX
- Release: 1988
- Genre: Interactive fiction
- Mode: Single-player

Gnome Ranger II: Ingrid's Back is a text adventure game by Level 9, released in 1988. It is the sequel to Gnome Ranger. The game has limited graphics on some platforms. A short novella by Peter McBride is included ("The 2nd Gnettlefield Journal") explaining the background to the story and providing hints for play.

== Plot ==
Having just returned from her "holiday" in the wilderness, the gnome Ingrid Bottomlow must save her home village of Little Moaning from destruction by a greedy property developer, Jasper Quickbuck. To do this she must get the various uncooperative inhabitants of the village to sign her petition.

== Gameplay ==
Gameplay is similar to Gnome Ranger. The player must explore Ingrid's village while collecting signatures for her petition by interacting with various non-player characters.

== Reception ==
Reception

Award
| Publication | Award |
|---|---|
| Your Sinclair | YS Megagame |

Computer and Video Games gave Ingrid's Back a very favorable review, with reviewer Keith Campbell calling it "the most enjoyable Level 9 adventure [he had] played to date" and praising its humor and difficulty curve.
