= Computing Today =

British computer magazine

- Cover of Computing Today from May 1983
- Categories: Home computing
- Frequency: Monthly
- First issue: March 1979
- Final issue: September 1985
- Company: Argus Press
- Country: United Kingdom
- Language: English
- ISSN: 0142-7210
- OCLC: 637400787

Computing Today was a computer magazine published by Argus Specialist Publications, it was printed in the UK from the late 1970s to the mid-1980s. It began life as a supplement to Electronics Today International for four issues and became an independent publication in March 1979. Some time after 1982 it bought out rival computing magazine Microcomputer Printout (formerly Printout) and the two magazines merged into one. The magazine ceased publication in September 1985.

It gave computer hardware and software reviews, programming tutorials and program listings for many of the popular home computers of the time. UK subscription cost 10 pounds 50 pence including postage circa 1981.
