= Sinclair Programs =

- July 1983 cover
- Frequency: Monthly
- Publisher: ECC Publications (May/June 1982 - December 1984); EMAP (December 1984 - September 1985)
- First issue: May/June 1982
- Final issue: September 1985
- Country: United Kingdom
- Based in: London, England
- Language: English
- ISSN: 0263-0265
- OCLC: 500175920

Sinclair Programs was a magazine published in the United Kingdom, initially by ECC Publications of London and subsequently by EMAP. It was originally dedicated entirely to listings for programs for the Sinclair Research ZX80, ZX81 and ZX Spectrum computers, contributed by readers. ZX80 listings no longer appeared after the May 1983 issue. Letters and software review pages were added in the March 1984 issue.

The magazine was one of three launched in 1982 by ECC, the other two being Sinclair User and Sinclair Projects, the latter dedicated to hardware projects for the Sinclair computers. The magazine was published between May/June 1982 and September 1985.
