= Scapeghost =

1989 video game

- Cover art by Godfrey Dowson
- Developer: Level 9
- Publisher: Level 9
- Platforms: Amiga, Amstrad CPC, Amstrad PCW, Atari 8-bit, Atari ST, BBC Micro, Commodore 64, MS-DOS, ZX Spectrum
- Release: 1989
- Genre: Interactive fiction
- Mode: Single-player

Scapeghost is a text adventure published by Level 9 Computing in 1989. It was the last text adventure game released by the company.

== Description ==
The player takes the role of police detective Alan Chance, who starts the game watching people disperse from his own funeral. Chance and his colleague Sarah were on an undercover mission, investigating a gang of drug dealers, when they were betrayed by an unknown agent and Chance was killed. Chance has returned as a ghost and finds that Sarah is missing, and his colleagues believe it was Chance's incompetence rather than betrayal that led to his own death. Chance has three nights to solve the crime that cost him his life, restore his reputation and save Sarah.

=== Components ===
The game box contains

- floppy disk
- manual
- wall poster
- postcard to be returned for free hint sheet

== Release ==
Level 9 Computing published video games between 1981 and 1991. The idea for Scapeghost was conceived of by Sandra Sharkey and Pete Gerrard, and the game was designed by Pete Austin and programmed by Graham Jones. Box cover art was created by Godfrey Dowson, and computer art was by Dicon Peeke. It was released for Amiga, Amstrad CPC, Amstrad PCW, Atari 8-bit computers, Atari ST, BBC Micro, Commodore 64, MS-DOS, and ZX Spectrum.

Scapeghost was the last text adventure game released by Level 9.

== Reception ==
Reception

Review score
Publication	Score
Zzap!64	97%

In the February–March 1990 edition of Games International, John Harrington commented that "the humour and atmosphere of Scapeghost kept me in good spirits." He concluded by rating the game a below average 6 out of 10, and the graphics a poor 5 out of 10, saying, "Hardened adventurers would probably not find it too challenging."

In Computer and Video Games #97, Keith Campbell thought the storyline was "very original with some highly unusual puzzles based on the supposed characteristics of ghosts." He noted that the high level commands used by Level 9 made the game "a pleasure to play, and free from frustration even if a silly mistake is made." Campbell concluded with a strong recommendation, saying, "Despite the occasional glitch, I rank Scapeghost as Level 9's most enjoyable adventure."
