= Jewels of Darkness =

1986 video game

- MS-DOS cover art
- Developer: Level 9
- Publisher: Telecomsoft
- Platforms: Amiga, Amstrad CPC, Amstrad PCW, Atari 8-bit, Atari ST, Commodore 64, Macintosh, MS-DOS, MSX, ZX Spectrum
- Release: 1986
- Genre: Interactive fiction
- Mode: Single-player

Jewels of Darkness is a trilogy of text adventure games by Level 9. The individual games were initially released separately in 1982. They featured some themes and names inspired by the books of J. R. R. Tolkien and so became known as the Middle-Earth Trilogy. The individual releases were available for the BBC Micro unlike the compilation.

In 1986 the three games were revised, expanded and rereleased together as a compilation. For legal reasons the references to Middle Earth were removed and the trilogy was retitled Jewels of Darkness. The games include simple static graphics.

== The games ==
=== Colossal Adventure ===
An expanded version of the original Adventure by Will Crowther and Don Woods

=== Adventure Quest ===
Similar in structure to the previous game, the player must defeat the Dark Lord, Agaliarept.

=== Dungeon Adventure ===
A continuation of the previous game; following the defeat of the Dark Lord, Agaliarept, the player must explore his dungeon looking for treasure.

== Reception ==
Reception

Review score
Publication	Score
Zzap!	92%

Computer Gaming World stated that the compilation's claim that the games had been "significantly revised to incorporate the latest innovative techniques" was false. It described the puzzles as illogical, the Commodore version's graphics as "crude", and, like the parser, below the standard of previous Firebird text adventures.

Zzap!64's reviewer remarked that "[The graphics are] colourful but they're not great works of art. And the location descriptions and scenarios have always struck me as being good enough on their own." It received a Your Sinclair Megagame award.
