= Time and Magik =

1988 video game

- Developer: Level 9
- Publisher: Mandarin Software
- Platforms: Amiga, Amstrad CPC, Amstrad PCW, Atari 8-bit, Atari ST, BBC Micro, Commodore 64, MS-DOS, ZX Spectrum
- Release: 1988
- Genre: Interactive fiction
- Mode: Single-player

Time and Magik is a trilogy of interactive fiction games by Level 9. The individual games were initially released separately in 1983-1986. In 1988 the three games were revised, expanded and re-released together as a compilation by Mandarin Software, a division of Europress Software.

== The games ==
=== Lords of Time ===
Father Time sends the player to different time zones to secure nine treasures that help to fight the evil Lords of Time.

=== Red Moon ===
Red Moon Crystal, a powerful source of Magik, has been stolen and must be recovered to save the country of Baskalos from destruction. The game won the award for best adventure game of the year in Crash magazine, and the game was voted best adventure game of the year at the Golden Joystick Awards.

=== The Price of Magik ===
Sequel to the previous game; Myglar the Magician, guardian of the Crystal, has become insane and is draining its energy for his own use; he must be defeated before it is exhausted.
