= Sinclair User =

Computer magazine published until April 1993

- Cover from 1987
- Former editors: Apr 1982: John Sterlicchi; May '82 - Jan '84: Nigel Clark; Feb '84 - May '86: Bill Scolding; Jun '86 - Apr '88: David Kelly; Mar '88 - May '89: Graham Taylor; Jun '89 - Nov '90: Jim Douglas; Dec '90 - Apr '92: Garth Sumpter; May '92 - May '93: Alan Dykes
- Categories: Computer magazines
- Frequency: Monthly
- Circulation: 96,000 (July 1984)
- First issue: April 1982
- Final issue Number: April 1993; 134 (133rd issue)
- Company: ECC Publications (Apr 1982 - Aug 1984); EMAP (Sep 84 - May 1993)
- Country: United Kingdom
- Language: English
- ISSN: 0262-5458

The Sinclair User was a magazine dedicated to the Sinclair Research range of home computers, most specifically the ZX Spectrum (while also occasionally covering arcade games). Initially published by ECC Publications, and later EMAP, it was published in the UK between 1982 and 1993, and was the longest running Sinclair-based magazine. The magazine contained news, game reviews, previews, tips, help guides, columns, readers' letters, and cover-mounted game demos.

== History ==
The debut issue, representative of the magazine's early style which was more hobbyist and less games-oriented than in later years

In earlier years, the magazine built up personality cults around some of its "hilariously" monikered staff, including Bill "Incorruptible" Scolding, John "Disgusting" Gilbert, Chris "Lunchbreaks" Bourne, Claire "Ligger" Edgely, Richard Price (writer of the "Gordo Greatbelly" adventure tips section), and columnist Andrew Hewson (founder of Hewson Consultants software).

Under David Kelly's editorial tenure, the magazine began to focus more on the gaming scene, and featured more colour graphics under designer Gareth "the Mad Celt". By the time of editor Graham Taylor, the magazine included the cartoon character Kamikaze Bear, and the tone of the publication changed from a semi-serious magazine to something aimed more at children.

High-quality games were indicated in reviews via the "Sinclair User Classic" award, the logo was used as a selling point for games, big and small.

In May 1992 the former rival publication CRASH was notionally subsumed into Sinclair User, but in practice this meant little more than the addition of the Crash! logo to the magazine's cover page.

== Timex Sinclair User ==
Timex Sinclair User was a spin-off for the US market.

A short-lived spin-off known as the Timex Sinclair User was also published for the American market, where versions of Sinclair computers were marketed under the Timex Sinclair name.

== See also ==
- Sinclair Programs
- Your Sinclair
- Computer and Video Games
