= Page 6 =

British computer magazine

- May/June 1987 issue
- Editor: Les Ellingham
- Categories: Atari 8-bit Atari ST
- Frequency: Bi-monthly
- Publisher: Page 6 Publishing
- Founded: 1982
- Final issue: 1998
- Based in: Stafford
- Language: English
- ISSN: 0952-4967

Page 6 (subtitled Atari Users Magazine) was a British magazine aimed at users of Atari 8-bit computers and Atari ST home computers. The first issue was in 1982, and it was renamed to Page 6 Atari User and then New Atari User before ceasing publication in 1998.

== History ==
The magazine had its origins in the newsletter of the Birmingham User's Group, an independent Atari club based in England. Les Ellingham was appointed to be the editor of the newsletter, but decided to produce a magazine with broader appeal instead. He remained editor of Page 6 throughout its entire run of 85 issues. Although subscription-only for most of its life, it was available through newsagents during the late 1980s and early 1990s.

When Database ceased publication of the original Atari User magazine in 1988, Page 6 bought the rights (and subscriber list), and renamed their magazine, firstly to Page 6 Atari User in February 1989 and then to New Atari User in June of the same year. The latter was simply Page 6 under a different (and more newsagent-friendly) name, and had next to no continuity with the original Atari User. The editor Les Ellingham had declined the offer to edit the original Atari User when approached by Database Publications in 1985.

Due to "high interest rate, reluctance of the news trade to support smaller circulation magazines and reducing advertising income", New Atari User had to be withdrawn from retail sales and become subscription-only with issue 59 (December–January 1993).

== Title ==
The magazine was named after the area of memory in 8-bit Atari computers covering locations 1536–1791. Memory is divided into pages of 256 bytes (the first being page 0). The sixth page begins at 256×6, or 1536. Page 6 is neither used by the operating system nor by Atari BASIC and so can be used to safely store short machine language routines to speed up BASIC programs.
