= Sigma 7 =

Sigma 7 may refer to:

- the callsign of the spacecraft used in the 1962 Mercury-Atlas 8 mission
- the SDS Sigma 7 computer, made by Scientific Data Systems (SDS), later known as Xerox Data Systems (XDS)
- Sigma 7 (video game), 1987 computer game by Durell Software
- Sigma 7 AC servo drive series from Yaskawa Electric Corporation
