= Combat Lynx =

1984 video game

- Publisher: Durell Software
- Platforms: Commodore 64, ZX Spectrum, Amstrad CPC, BBC Micro, and Acorn Electron
- Release: 1984
- Genre: Combat flight simulation

Combat Lynx is a real-time combat flight simulation game developed by Durell Software and released in 1984 for the Commodore 64 and ZX Spectrum, with versions for the Amstrad CPC, BBC Micro, and Electron following in 1985. The game puts players in control of a Westland Lynx helicopter, tasking them with defending bases and troops while destroying enemy forces. Durell Software Ltd. developed Combat Lynx with assistance from Westland Helicopters, the manufacturers of the real Lynx helicopter.

== Gameplay ==
In Combat Lynx, players pilot a Lynx helicopter in a three-dimensional, randomly generated battlefield. The game combines elements of flight simulation with strategic gameplay, requiring players to manage resources, defend bases, and engage the enemy in combat missions. It supports various control schemes, including two joysticks, joystick and keyboard, or keyboard only. There are nearly 30 control keys, most of which are redefinable.

Players view the game from behind the helicopter, with the landscape scrolling beneath. The helicopter can fly in any direction, hover, rise, and dip. The screen displays flight instruments, surrounding terrain, and a heads-up display showing altitude, speed, fuel, and weapon status. The landscape is shown from one of the cardinal directions. If the player rotates the helicopter over 45 degrees, the screen briefly blacks out before redrawing the landscape from the new perspective.

Combat involves using various weapons against enemy tanks, fighter jets, and other targets. The helicopter can be equipped with rockets, machine guns, cannons, anti-tank missiles, anti-aircraft missiles, and mines. Weapons are selected and fired using a combination of joystick and keyboard controls, with some requiring manual aiming while others, like heat-seeking missiles, lock on automatically.

Players must manage multiple bases, supplying them with fuel, weapons, and personnel transported from headquarters. The number of bases varies from three to six, depending on the chosen skill level. Bases need to be defended from enemy attacks, and if all bases are overrun or all three helicopters are destroyed, the game ends.

Before missions, players can arm and equip their helicopter using an equipment menu. The game displays 3D wireframe plans of the Lynx, showing the selected items, their quantity, and weight. Players must balance their load against the helicopter's maximum carrying capacity.

A key strategic element is the intelligence map, which can be called up to show battlefield positions, including enemy concentrations, allied forces, and land contours. The map is divided into grids and updates periodically, though enemy positions may move between updates. While viewing the map, the helicopter continues to move, requiring careful attention to avoid crashes.

There are four skill levels affecting the number of bases, enemy vehicles, and missile accuracy. Players receive an efficiency rating which depends on the number of bases destroyed, troops lost, allied vehicles lost, ammunition used, and the number and value of targets hit. Scores are recorded on a high-score table.

== Reception ==
Reception

Review scores
Publication	Score
Amtix	83%
Crash	88%
Computer and Video Games	30/40
Sinclair User	8/10
Your Spectrum	6/15
Amstrad Computer User	4/5

Award
Publication	Award
Crash	Smash!

Combat Lynx received generally favourable reviews from contemporary gaming magazines. Several reviewers noted the game's unique blend of action and strategy. Crash magazine wrote that the game "can certainly be played like a shoot 'em up... or as a game of stealthy strategy."

The game's graphics and 3D representation were commended. Crash praised the innovative use of contour lines for 3D graphics, calling it "more effective than an 'illusion' of 3D." Amstrad Computer User noted that "the landscape comes in nicely from the distance and features on the ground get bigger and smaller with distance." However, Your Spectrum criticised the screen redrawing mechanism when turning, describing it as "strange" and potentially disorienting.

The complexity of the controls and the game's steep learning curve were points of contention among reviewers. Computer and Video Games noted that "the controls are very complex—but not impossible to master," advising players to "take time to read the comprehensive instructions." Sinclair User suggested that the game might be "too much of a simulation" for some players, potentially "tedious" for arcade gamers due to "the lack of immediate excitement."

Despite the initial difficulty, some reviewers found the game rewarding once mastered. Amtix stated, "Once you have mastered the controls, you can then start to enjoy Combat Lynx properly," praising its "professional and polished look." Crash concluded that the game offered "excellent value for money" and would "provide hours and hours of fun" for strategy game enthusiasts.

The Amstrad version was particularly well-received, with Amtix declaring it "the best" compared to other computer versions of the game.
