= Saboteur II: Avenging Angel =

1987 video game

- Publisher: Durell Software
- Designer: Clive Townsend
- Composer: Rob Hubbard
- Platforms: Amstrad CPC, MS-DOS, Commodore 64, ZX Spectrum
- Release: 1987
- Genre: Action-adventure
- Mode: Single-player

Saboteur II: Avenging Angel, also known as Saboteur 2, is an action-adventure game created by Clive Townsend and released by Durell Software in 1987 for the ZX Spectrum, Amstrad CPC, Commodore 64, and MS-DOS compatible operating systems. A sequel to 1985's Saboteur, the player controls a sister of Ninja from the first game on a mission to avenge his death. Saboteur II was one of the first action-adventure games with a female protagonist and was well received by critics.

== Gameplay ==
The game starts with a drop into the building from a hang glider. Then, while watching out for pumas and robotic guards, the player has to search through the command centre for boxes of supplies. Some of the boxes contain one of 14 pieces of punched tape, which on all but the first level must be collected and taken to the computer terminal. Once this has been achieved, the player must make their way to the bottom centre of the caves, and escape using the motorcycle which can be found there. In all, the site covers over 700 computer screens. There are nine missions of increasing difficulty level (codenamed Rin, Kyo, Toh, Sha, Kai, Jin, Retsu, Zai and Zen), each with more objectives (such as collecting more pieces of punched tape, or having to disable an electrified perimeter fence protecting the tunnel).

Map of Saboteur II on the ZX Spectrum loading screen.

== Plot ==
The player takes control of a female ninja named Nina (a sister of Ninja, the deceased hero of the original Saboteur), who must break into a dictator's high-security compound to alter the course of a nuclear ballistic missile and then escape. The enemy's command centre and office complex is being built on top of a mountain filled with tunnels and caverns. An armoury building is on the top left of the mountain, a missile silo is on the top right, while the central top area is still being developed; there is only one way out of the mountain, which is the long entrance tunnel on the bottom left.

== Development and release ==
Saboteur II was one of the first action-adventure games with a female protagonist. According to Luke Plunkett of Kotaku, "for a serious game released in 1987, that was kind of a big deal, especially since she wasn't a princess or cartoon character. She was a ninja". The game's designer Clive Townsend said it was a conscious decision: "I wanted something original, and it seemed quite different to most other games. It's become acceptable now after Tomb Raider, but at the time it was a bit strange. Why shouldn't ninja characters be female?" Nevertheless, the PC version features a male ninja on the cover. Townsend traced the character art for the game's loading screen from an erotic magazine. Saboteur II itself was supposed to be followed by the cancelled Saboteur 3D for the ZX Spectrum, which would feature isometric perspective graphics.

== Reception ==
Reception

Review scores
Publication	Score
Crash	83%
Computer and Video Games	27/40
Your Sinclair	9/10; 80% (re-release)
CU Amiga-64	81% (re-release)
Zzap!64	52% (re-release)
ASM	36/40

Award
Publication	Award
Your Sinclair	Megagame

Initial reviews of the game were positive. For instance, Phil South from Your Sinclair opined that the game was "a fine sequel, but possibly more important, it's a fine game in its own right. Saboteur was an original twist on an old platform riff, so that makes Sab II a double twist with a backflip and a lager chaser!" When the game was re-released in 1989, Your Sinclair's Marcus Berkmann wrote that "if it doesn't perhaps hold up too well now, it's still an entertaining enough chase-and-kick 'em up with the novelty of a female hero".

== Legacy ==
A remake of the game was released in 2019 (32 years after the release of the original game) on Steam, Nintendo Switch, PS4, and Xbox One. It came with a few additions like new graphics, many remixes of the original music, and more information on the lore.

Deep Cover (a Saboteur 2 prequel for the ZX Spectrum 128) won Best Text Adventure at the Planeta Sinclair 'Game of the Year' awards 2021.

Following the release of the remake, two sequels were planned: Saboteur SiO was released in 2020 and Saboteur ZERO was slated for a late 2022 release.
