= Turbo Esprit =

1986 video game

- ZX Spectrum cover art
- Developer: Mike Richardson
- Publisher: Durell Software
- Platforms: ZX Spectrum, Amstrad CPC, Commodore 64
- Release: 1986
- Genres: Driving, vehicular combat
- Mode: Single-player

Turbo Esprit is a 1986 video game published by Durell Software in 1986 for the ZX Spectrum, Commodore 64, and Amstrad CPC. The game was very detailed and advanced for its time, featuring car indicator lights, pedestrians, traffic lights, and a view of the car's interior controls. Turbo Esprit was the first free-roaming driving game, and has been cited as a major influence on the later Grand Theft Auto series.

== Gameplay ==
The object of the game is to prevent a gang of drug smugglers completing a delivery of heroin, by tracking down their cars and destroying them, or ramming them into submission. The player takes the role of a special agent driving the titular Lotus Esprit car, which had been used in a James Bond film a few years previously. The player must travel around one of four available cities looking for the criminals. Messages from HQ will flash up periodically giving the location of a target armoured car, which may then be tracked on the map. A courier car would then attempt to rendezvous with the armoured car to transfer the heroin, and the armoured car would then flee the city. Other courier cars would act as decoys.

Players could elect to wait until the drug transfer was complete before intercepting the armoured car, or instead attempt to find the one genuine courier car in order to prevent the transfer from taking place.

Once a drug dealer's car is found it can either be followed, destroyed with the Esprit's built-in machine gun, or repeatedly rammed until it surrenders. Different cars may need to be dealt with in different ways; for example armoured cars must be rammed as shooting has no effect, whereas randomly occurring "hit cars" are the only other vehicles that can match the Esprit for speed, so ramming them is more difficult. Following a drug dealer's car too closely may arouse suspicion and cause them to abort their mission.

Points are scored by apprehending the criminals. Additional points are awarded if they are captured alive (by disabling their car rather than destroying it), and if the heroin transfer has taken place (as there is now greater evidence of their crime).

Penalties are incurred for hitting scenery or other cars, and the player's car is likely to explode if it crashes into anything while travelling fast. As in real life, speeding greatly increases risk.

== Environment ==
Traffic stops at the lights (Amstrad CPC version).

The game features four free-roaming cities (Wellington, Gamesborough, Minster and Romford) through which the player may drive as they see fit. Each city features a grid plan of roads, and each is progressively more difficult; the first city contains many three lane roads making speeding and dodging traffic easy, whereas the later ones have more two-lane and one-way roads.

The cities contain many computer-controlled cars, all of which obey basic traffic laws, such as keeping below a set speed limit, stopping at the working traffic lights, moving out of the way of obstacles such as roadworks, and attempting to avoid head-on collisions with the player. They will also stop at zebra crossings to allow waiting pedestrians to cross the road. Contact with or destruction of these cars results in score penalties.

The player's car can also run out of fuel, and so the player must stop at petrol stations to refill.

The Spanish version claims it to be set in the city of Manhattan, despite the fact that no changes were made to the game itself, which retains its British-style road markings and driving on the left.

== Development ==
According to author Mike Richardson, Turbo Esprit took 10 months to develop, the longest time he ever spent on a single game. It was developed with the cooperation of Lotus Cars Ltd., who provided "technical assistance".

== Reception ==
Reception

Review scores
Publication	Score
Crash	88%
Computer and Video Games	29/40
Sinclair User	5/5
Your Sinclair	9/10
Your Computer	3/5

Awards
Publication	Award
Crash	Crash Smash
Sinclair User	SU Classic
Your Sinclair	Megagame

Turbo Esprit was generally well received by the gaming press, gaining positive reviews from most major gaming magazines. Sinclair User called it "one of the best games ever released", and it has since been described as "pioneering" and "one of the Spectrum's best original games". The Spectrum version was voted number 64 in the Your Sinclair Readers' Top 100 Games of All Time. Retro Gamer magazine said of the game: "It was way ahead of its time and it could be argued that what you are looking at here is the genesis of the Grand Theft Auto series", and that it "sealed Durell's reputation as a purveyor of quality software".

The game reached number eight in the Gallup All-Formats charts and number one in the ZX Spectrum chart, replacing Movie.
