= Critical Mass (1985 video game) =

- Developer: Simon Francis
- Publisher: Durell Software
- Platforms: Amstrad CPC, Commodore 64, ZX Spectrum
- Release: 1985
- Genre: Action

Critical Mass (known as Power! in North America) is a video game developed by Simon Francis and published in 1985 by Durell Software for the Amstrad CPC, Commodore 64, and ZX Spectrum.

== Plot ==
An anti-matter power station on an orbiting asteroid is used by the local star system for energy. The station has been taken over by hostile aliens who are threatening to overload the power system which will turn the reactor into a massive black hole and destroy not only the planetary system, but several nearby stars as well.

The object of the game is to make it to the heavily defended power station and disable it before the reactor reaches critical mass and implodes.

== Gameplay ==
The player may control the movement of the hovercraft using a joystick, pushing forward to accelerate, and pulling back to decrease speed.

== Reception ==
Reception

Awards
| Publication | Award |
|---|---|
| Crash | Smash |
| Dragon | 4 stars |
