= Harrier Attack =

1983 video game

- Developer: Durell Software
- Publisher: Durell Software
- Programmers: Oric-1; Ron Jeffs; ZX Spectrum; Mike Richardson; C64; John Parkinson
- Platforms: Amstrad CPC, Commodore 64, Oric 1, ZX Spectrum
- Release: 1983: Spectrum, Oric; 1984: C64, CPC
- Genre: Scrolling shooter
- Mode: Single-player

Harrier Attack (stylized as Harrier Attack!) is a horizontally scrolling shooter released for the Oric-1 and ZX Spectrum in 1983 by Durell Software. Ports for the Amstrad CPC and Commodore 64 were published in 1984.

== Gameplay ==
The player controls a Sea Harrier fighter, flying to the right over a scrolling seascape and landscape viewed from the side. The goals are to take off from a carrier, attack ships and land targets, avoid the occasional missile and enemy fighter, then land back on the carrier again. Although the game is a work of fiction, it was inspired by the 1982 Falklands War, in which the Sea Harrier played a major role.
