= Lotus Esprit =

British sports car

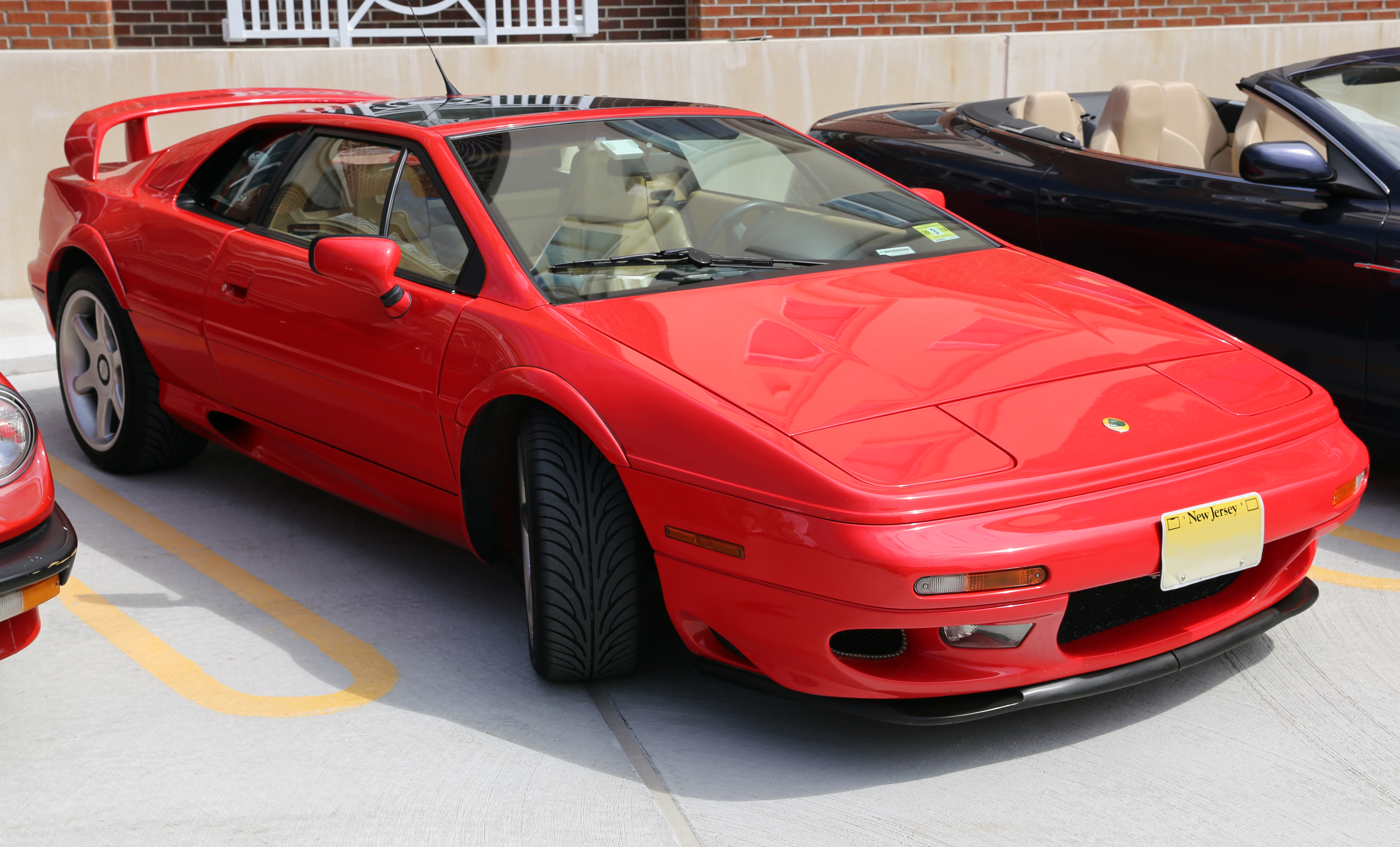
- 1999 Lotus Esprit V8

Overview
- Manufacturer: Lotus Cars
- Production: 1976–2004; 10,675 produced
- Assembly: United Kingdom: Hethel, Norfolk, England

Body and chassis
- Class: Sports car (S)
- Body style: 2-door coupé
- Layout: Longitudinal, Rear mid-engine, rear-wheel drive

Chronology
- Predecessor: Lotus Europa

The Lotus Esprit is a sports car built by Lotus Cars from 1976 to 2004 at their Hethel, England factory. It has a rear mid-engine, rear-wheel-drive layout. Together with the Lotus Elise / Exige, it is one of Lotus' most long-lived models.

The Esprit was among the first of the (near) straight-lined, hard-edge creased, and sometimes wedge-shaped, polygonal "folded paper" designs of the prolific, and highly successful Italian industrial and automotive designer Giorgetto Giugiaro. The Esprit's backbone chassis was later adapted to carry the body of the DeLorean car, another low-bodied, Giugiaro-drawn, sharp-creased, wedge-shaped sportscar design. In 1978, the first updates led to the series 2 and 2.2 L (134 cu in) engined Esprit S2.2, made until the 1982–1988 Series 3 and Turbo Esprit models, that used a 1980 Giugiaro designed aerodynamic and aesthetic restyling package.

The Lotus Esprit however, lived on through the 1990s, and into the 2000s. It received its first significant restyling by designer Peter Stevens, who also did styling on the McLaren F1. Stevens gave the Esprit overall softer lines and shapes, but the car did not get a new series number – it is instead often just called the 'Stevens Esprit', or by its project number, the X180, made from 1988 to 1994.

In 1994, an official Series 4 Esprit, drawn by designer Julian Thomson, had a further rounded shape, especially the bumper sections and lower body of the car. Styling-wise, this became the most long-lived Esprit (1994–2004), only receiving its last changes, by Russell Carr in 2002.

Over the years, the performance of the Esprit's 4-cylinder engine was increased from around 150 PS (148 hp; 110 kW) and just under 200 N⋅m (148 lb⋅ft) of torque, to double those power figures, mainly through greater inlet and exhaust flow, and strong turbo-charging. And from 1996, a new 3.5 L (214 cu in) V8 twin-turbo engine was added, offering 355 PS (350 hp; 261 kW). Contrary to a long list of low-volume British (sports) cars, with the 3.5 L Rover V8 engine, the Esprit received a Lotus in-house designed V8. Top speed rose from some 214 km/h (133 mph) in 1976, to over 280 km/h (174 mph) for the V8, twenty years later.

After a 28-year production run, the Esprit was one of the last cars made with pop-up headlights, together with the 5th generation Chevrolet Corvette.

== Background ==
In 1970 Tony Rudd, who had started at Lotus the previous year, proposed two new model development projects. The first, Project M50, resulted in the 1974 Elite. The second, Project M70, meant to develop a successor to the Europa which, like the Europa, was to be a two-door fixed-head mid-engine coupé.

A meeting between Colin Chapman and Giugiaro was arranged in 1971 by designer Oliver Winterbottom, who also suggested that Giugiaro use his Maserati Boomerang concept as the inspiration for the new Lotus.

Work began on the new car in mid-1971 with production of a 1:4 scale model. According to Italdesign, Chapman was disappointed with the wind-tunnel test results with the model and halted the project, but the Italian coachbuilder pressed on and built a full-size mock-up on a stretched, modified Europa chassis. That nameless prototype, often simply called "the Silver Car", appeared on the Italdesign stand at the 1972 Turin Auto Show and the positive reception convinced Chapman to approve further development.

Development continued with production of a second prototype, registered as "IDGG 01" and known as "the Red Car", that would be a functional car. Design of the car's mechanical systems progressed, but was not complete when the Esprit was officially announced.

== S1 (1976) ==
Lotus Esprit S1
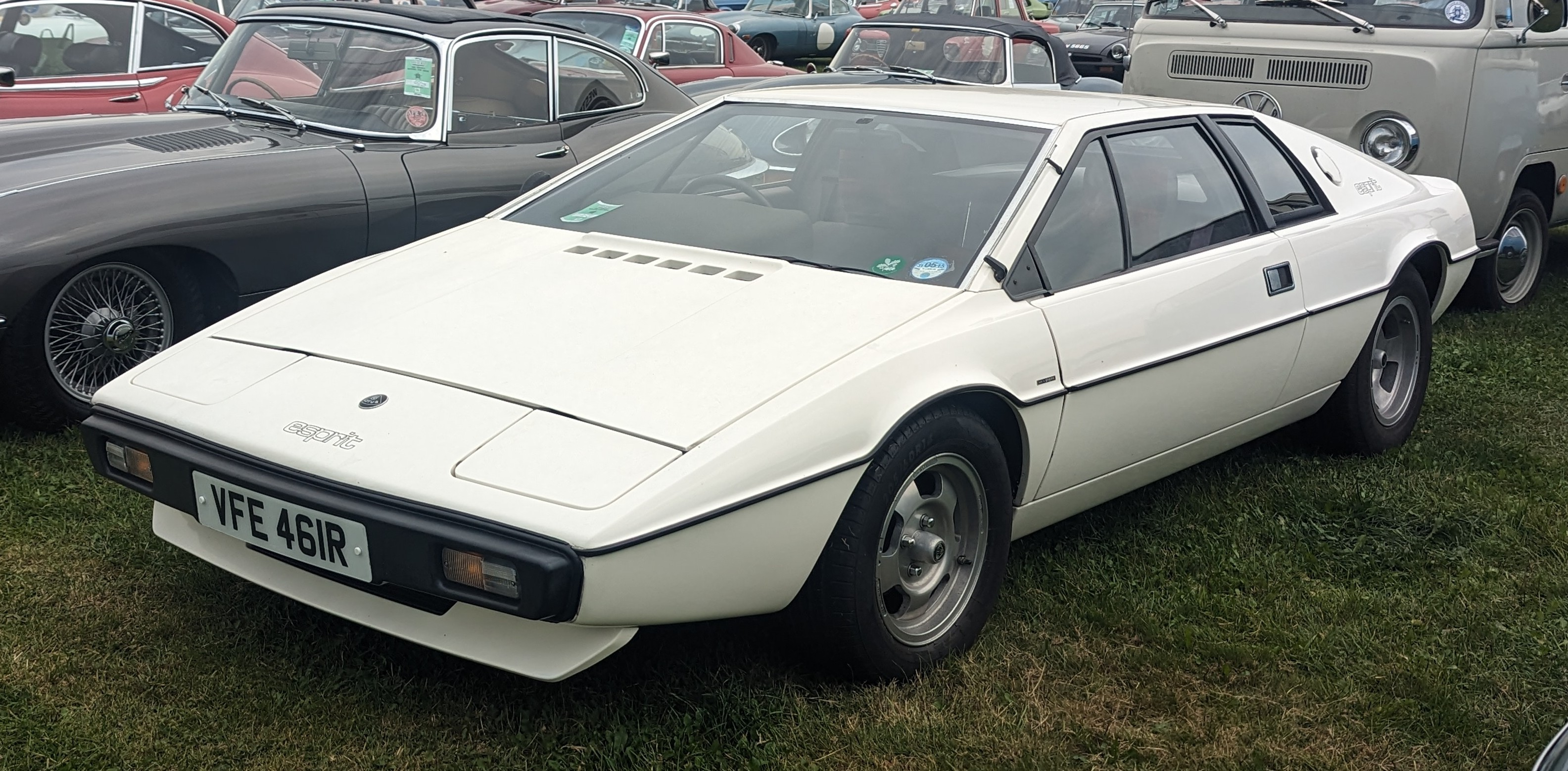

Overview
- Production: June 1976–1978; 718 produced
- Designer: Giorgetto Giugiaro at Italdesign Giugiaro

Powertrain
- Engine: 2.0 L (1,973 cc) type 907 I4
- Transmission: 5-speed Citroën C35 manual

Dimensions
- Wheelbase: 2,438 mm (96.0 in)
- Length: 4,260 mm (167.7 in)
- Width: 1,861 mm (73.3 in)
- Height: 1,111 mm (43.7 in)
- Kerb weight: 900 kg (1,984 lb)

The Esprit was launched in October 1975 at the Paris Motor Show and entered production in June 1976, replacing the Europa in the Lotus model lineup. These first cars became known as "Series 1" (or S1) Esprits. The wedge-shaped fibreglass body was mounted on a steel backbone chassis. Power was from the 1,973 cc (120.4 cu in) Lotus 907 four-cylinder engine that was rated at 160 hp (119 kW; 162 PS) in European trim and 140 hp (104 kW; 142 PS) in US/Federal trim. The engine was mounted longitudinally behind the passengers and drove the rear wheels through a Citroën C35 5-speed manual transaxle also used in the SM and Maserati Merak. Rear brakes were mounted inboard, following contemporary racing practice. The Series 1 embodied Lotus' performance through light weight mantra, weighing less than 1,000 kg (2,205 lb).

Front suspension consisted of upper A-arms and lower lateral links triangulated by the anti-roll bar. Rear suspension consisted of tapering box-section trailing arms and lower lateral links. The half-shafts had no provision for plunge and handled some of the lateral forces. There were coil-over shock absorbers and disc brakes at all four corners. Steering was by an unassisted rack and pinion.

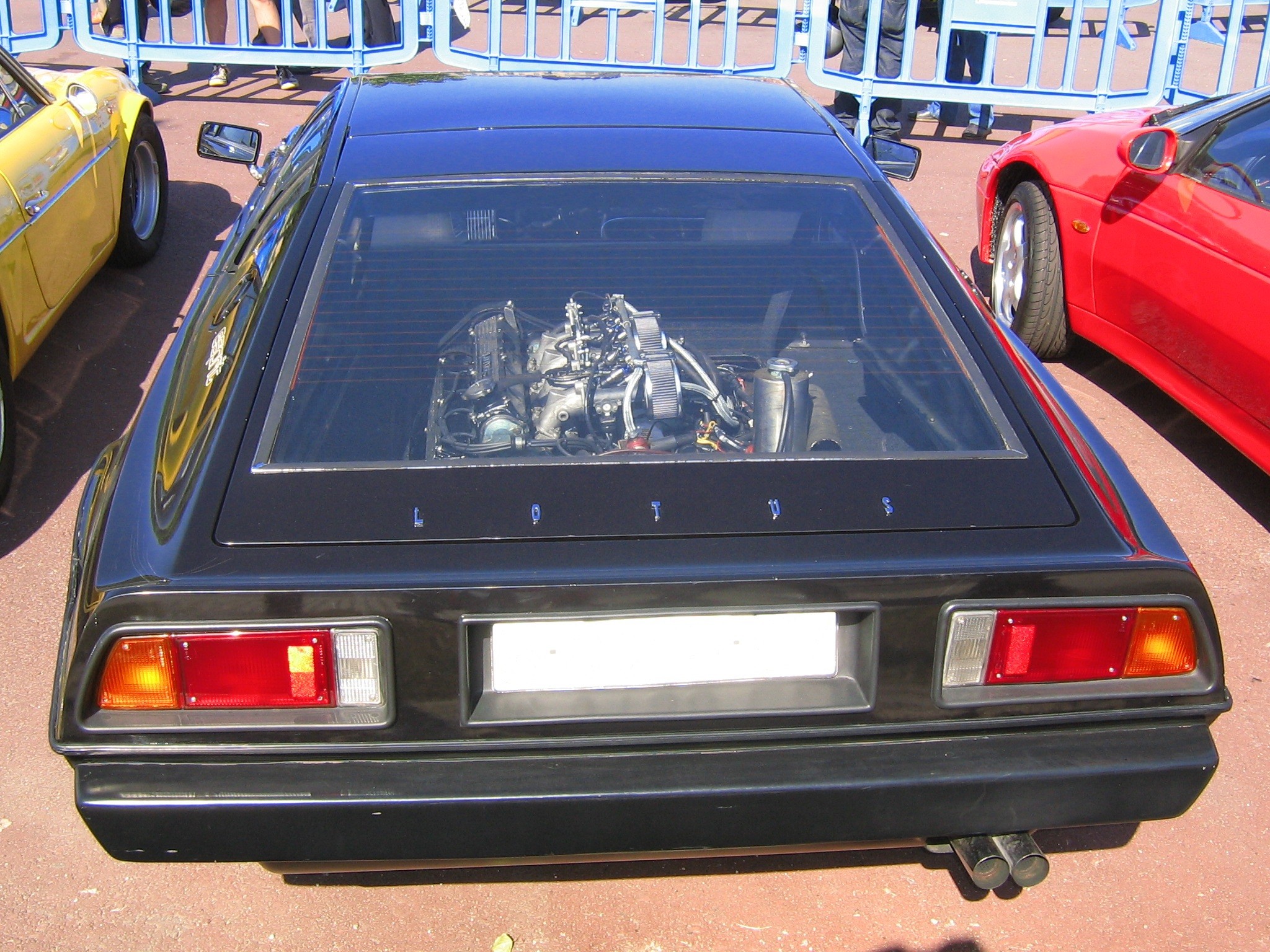
The S1 Esprit used the tail-lights from the Fiat X1/9

While the S1 Esprit was lauded for its handling and was said to have the best steering of any Esprit, it was generally regarded as being under-powered, especially in markets such as the United States where the engine was stifled by emission controls. Lotus' claim of acceleration from 0–97 km/h (0–60 mph) in 6.8 seconds and a top speed of 222 km/h (138 mph) may have been optimistic, as actual road tests revealed a 0-60 mph acceleration time of 8 seconds and a top speed of about 214 km/h (133 mph).

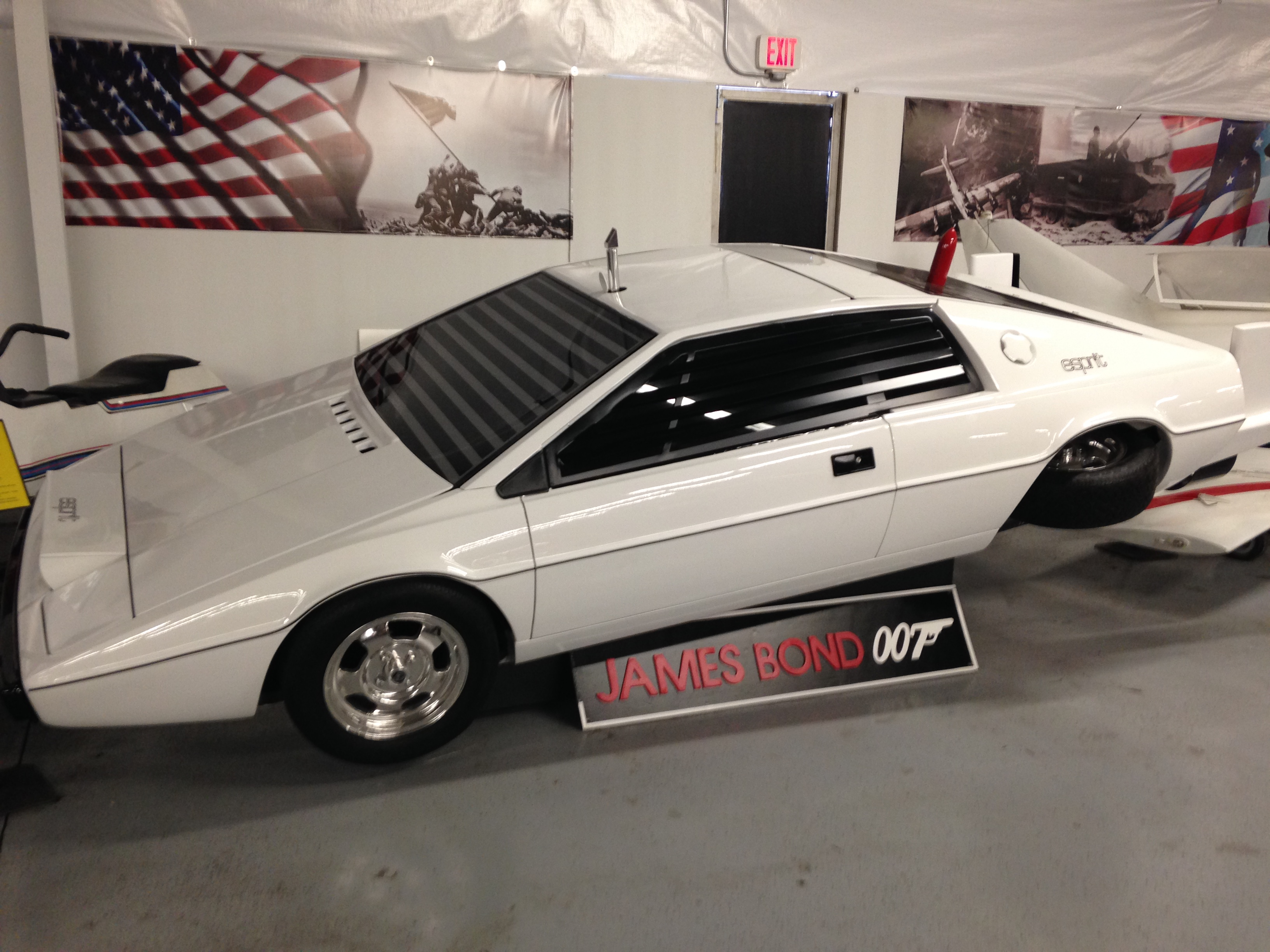
Very early Lotus Esprits were used in the Roger Moore era James Bond film The Spy Who Loved Me

The S1 Esprit was distinguished from later Esprits by its snow-shovel style front air dam, Fiat X1/9-sourced taillights, absence of body-side ducting, and Wolfrace alloy wheels. Inside the car, the S1 Esprit had a one-piece instrument cluster with green-faced Veglia gauges. The S1 is rare in the present day, mostly due to drivetrain problems.

== S2 (1978) and derivatives ==
Esprit Series 2
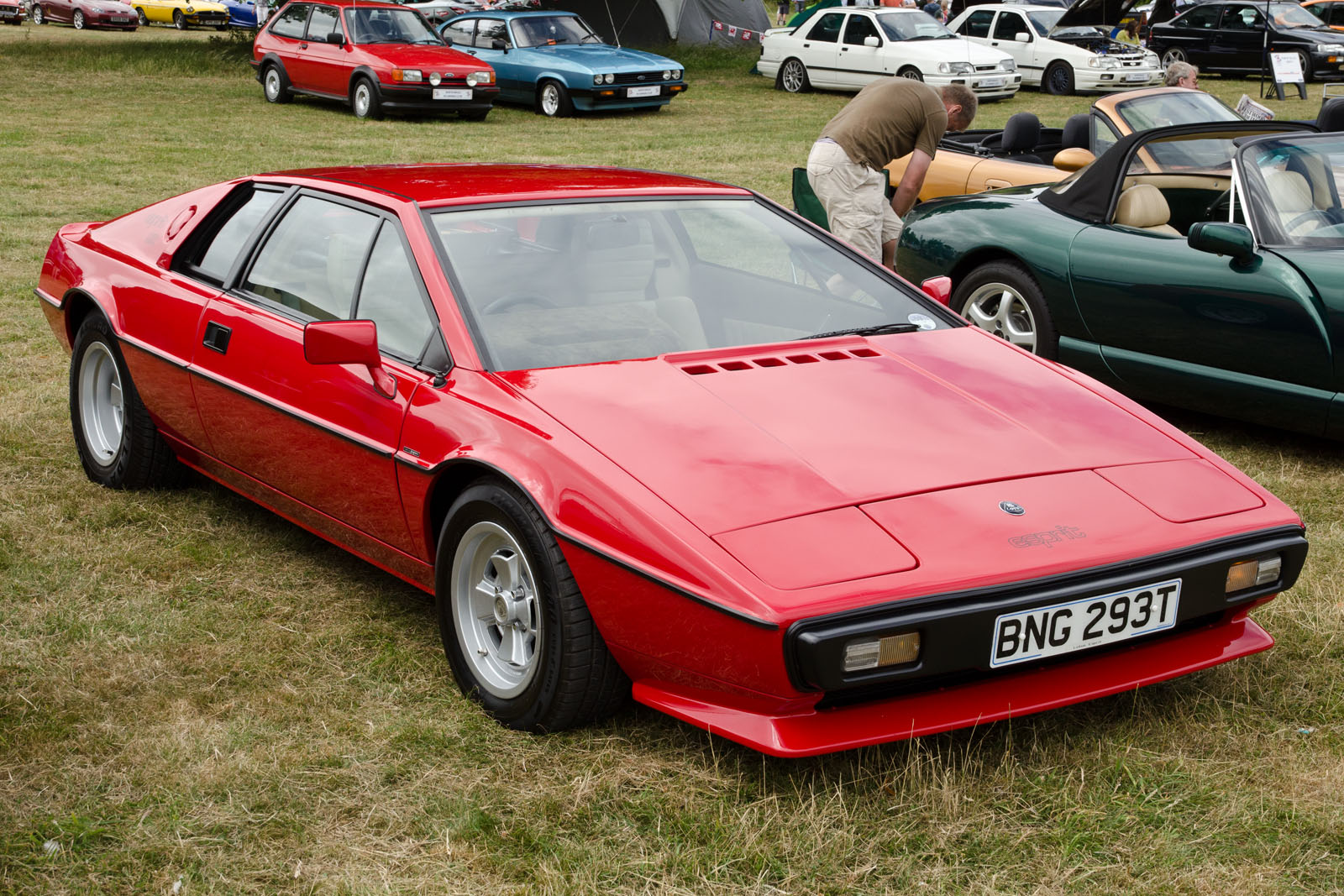

Overview
- Production: 1978–1982; 1,149 produced

Powertrain
- Engine: 2.0 L (1,973 cc) type 907 I4; 2.2 L (2,174 cc) type 912 I4
- Transmission: 5-speed Citroën C35 manual

Dimensions
- Wheelbase: 2,438 mm (96.0 in)
- Length: 4,280 mm (168.5 in)
- Width: 1,861 mm (73.3 in)
- Height: 1,111 mm (43.7 in)
- Kerb weight: 1,050 kg (2,315 lb)

In 1978, the revised Series 2 (or S2) Esprit was introduced. External changes included intake and cooling ducts added behind the rear quarter windows; bigger, ribbed taillights, this time from the Rover SD1, and a new front spoiler that was now integrated, folding rearward under the nose and so forming the start of the car's initially modest, thin black side-skirts.

S2 Esprits also had 360 mm (14 in) Speedline alloy wheels designed by Lotus. Other changes included relocating the battery from above the right side fuel tank under the rear quarter window to the rear of the car, adding an access door to the engine cover, installing wider seats and replacing the Veglia instrument cluster with individual gauges made by Smiths and a new style of illuminated dashboard switches. Many switches and buttons came from the Morris Marina.

A special edition model was released to commemorate Lotus' victory in the 1978 F1 World Championship. Wearing the black and gold livery of John Player & Sons (JPS), Lotus' F1 sponsor at the time, these cars were known as the Commemorative Edition Esprits as Lotus had stopped being sponsored by JPS. They were mechanically identical to the regular 2.0, with special seat and dash trim, smaller steering wheel and special plaque. According to Lotus a series of 300 were built, but it is likely the total was considerably lower. Lotus' production records are notoriously vague, but reliable estimates suggest that 149 Commemorative Esprit cars were made.

The S2.2 was a stop-gap model introduced in May 1980 whose only major difference from the S2 was, as indicated in its model name, having a 2.2 L type 912 engine. Engine power output was unchanged but torque rose from 190 N⋅m (140 lb⋅ft) to 217 N⋅m (160 lb⋅ft). The S2.2 received a galvanised chassis, but not the revised chassis structure to come in the Series 3. S2.2 cars are extremely rare even among Esprits. According to Lotus only 88 were produced during its thirteen-month production span.

=== Essex Turbo Esprit (1980) ===
In 1980 the Essex Turbo Esprit was launched. This special edition model wore the blue, red and chrome livery of the Essex Overseas Petroleum Corporation, the sponsor of Team Lotus from 1979 to 1981. While Lotus dealer Bell and Colvill had been offering turbo conversions for the S2 Esprit from as early as 1978, the Essex Turbo Esprit was the first factory turbocharged Esprit. The Essex Turbo Esprit received the dry sump type 910 engine which has a power output of 213 PS (157 kW; 210 hp) at 6,250 rpm and 200 lb⋅ft (271 N⋅m) of torque at 4,500 rpm. Acceleration from 0-97 km/h (60 mph) could be achieved in 6.1 seconds and a top speed of 241 km/h (150 mph).

The chassis and rear suspension were redesigned, with an upper link added at the rear to alleviate strain on the half-shafts. The brakes were also improved. Giugiaro designed an aerodynamic body kit for the car, with a rear lip spoiler, prominent louvered rear hatch, more substantial bumpers, a deeper front airdam, and air ducts in the sills just ahead of the new three-piece 15-inch Compomotive rear wheels. Inside scarlet leather combined with a roof-mounted Panasonic stereo for a dramatic environment. 45 Essex Turbo Esprit cars were built, interspersed and followed by a number of non-Essex-liveried but otherwise identical specification dry sump turbo cars.

By the end of 1980, Lotus was building three different models of Esprit with distinct chassis designs and body moulds - the domestic (i.e. UK) S2.2, the export S2.2, and the dry sump-engined Turbo Esprit.

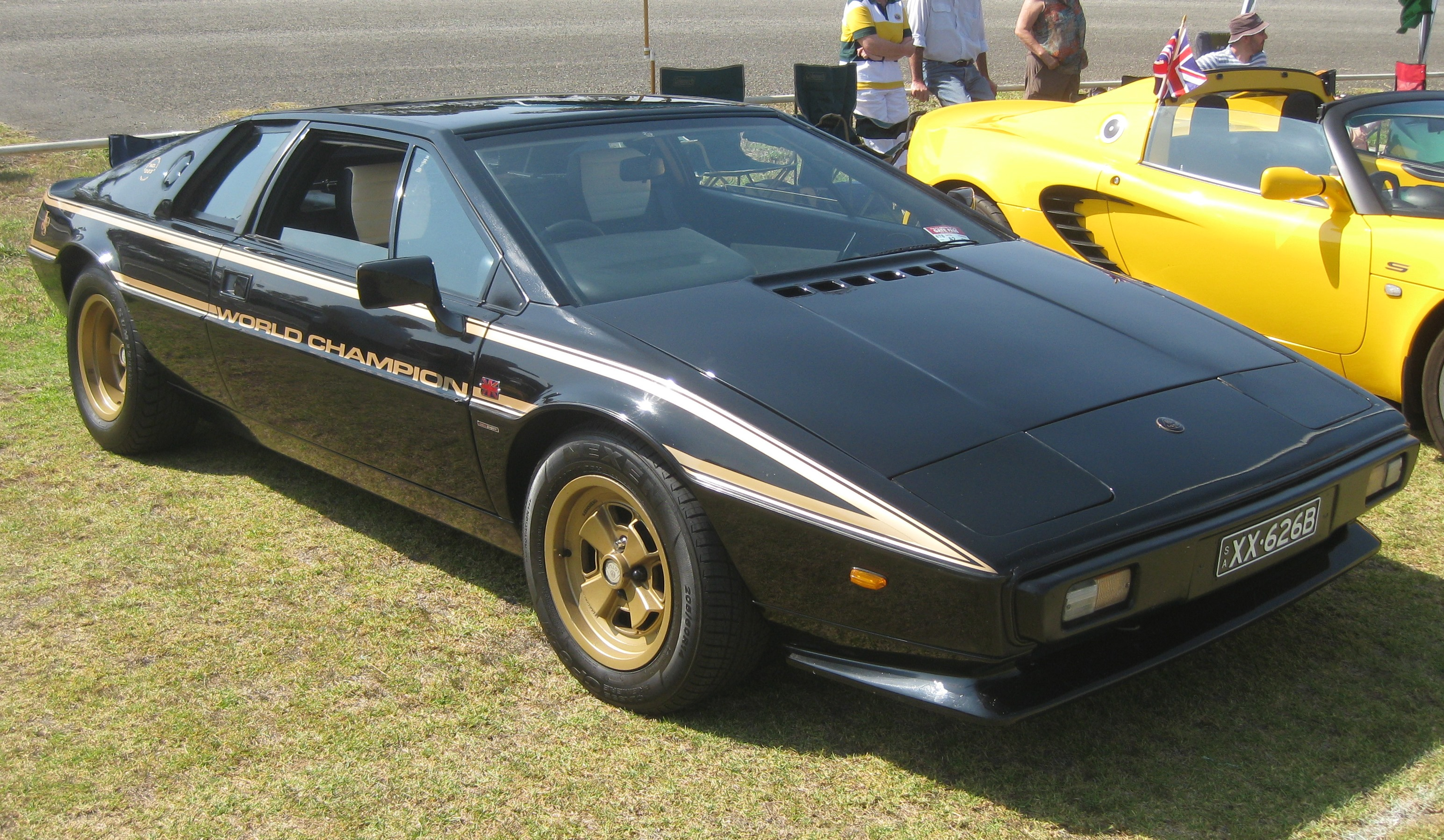
Esprit S2 Commemorative edition

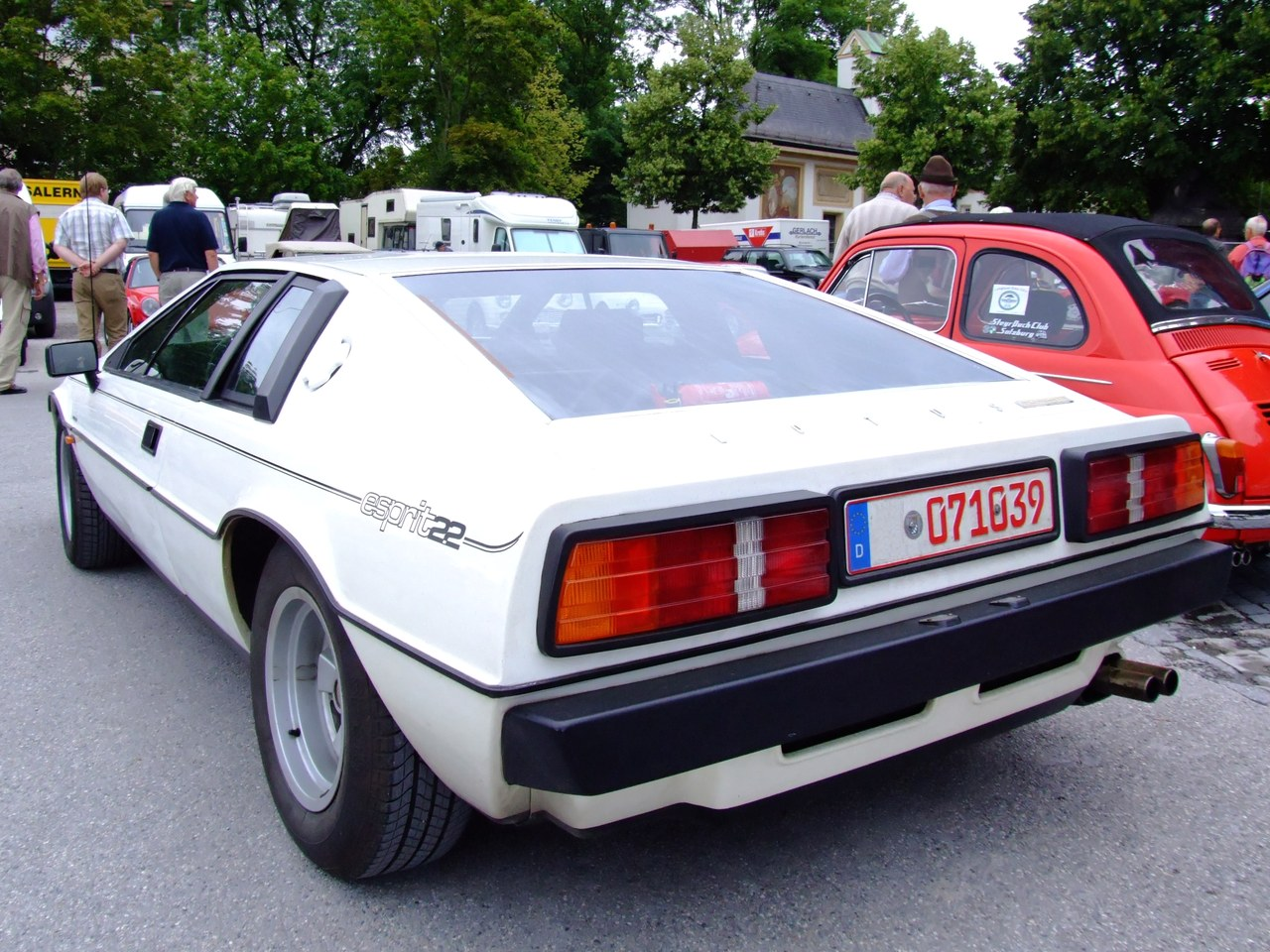
The interim Lotus Esprit S2.2

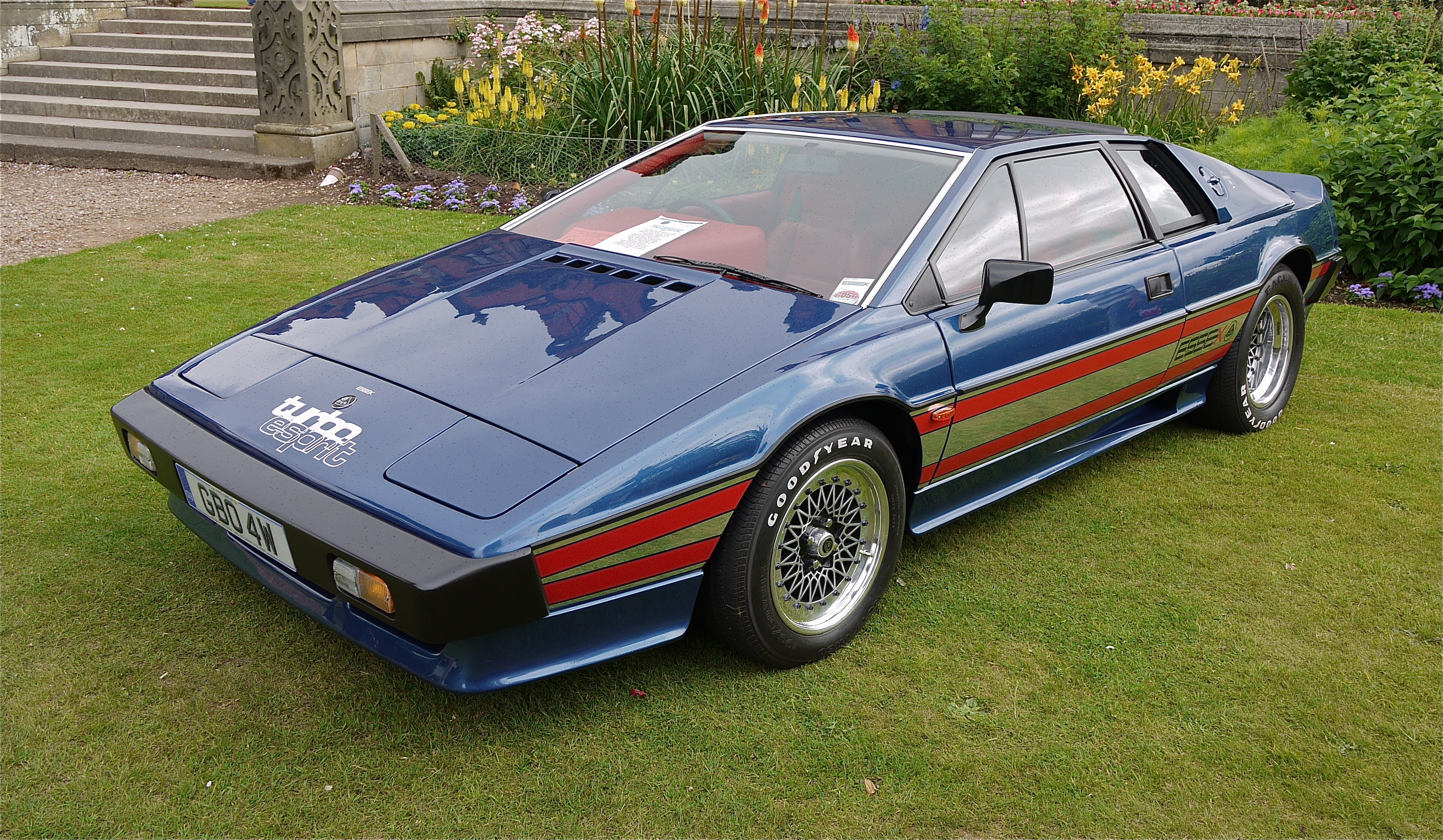
1980 Lotus Essex Turbo Esprit

== S3, Turbo Esprit (1982) and derivatives ==
Series 3 and Turbo
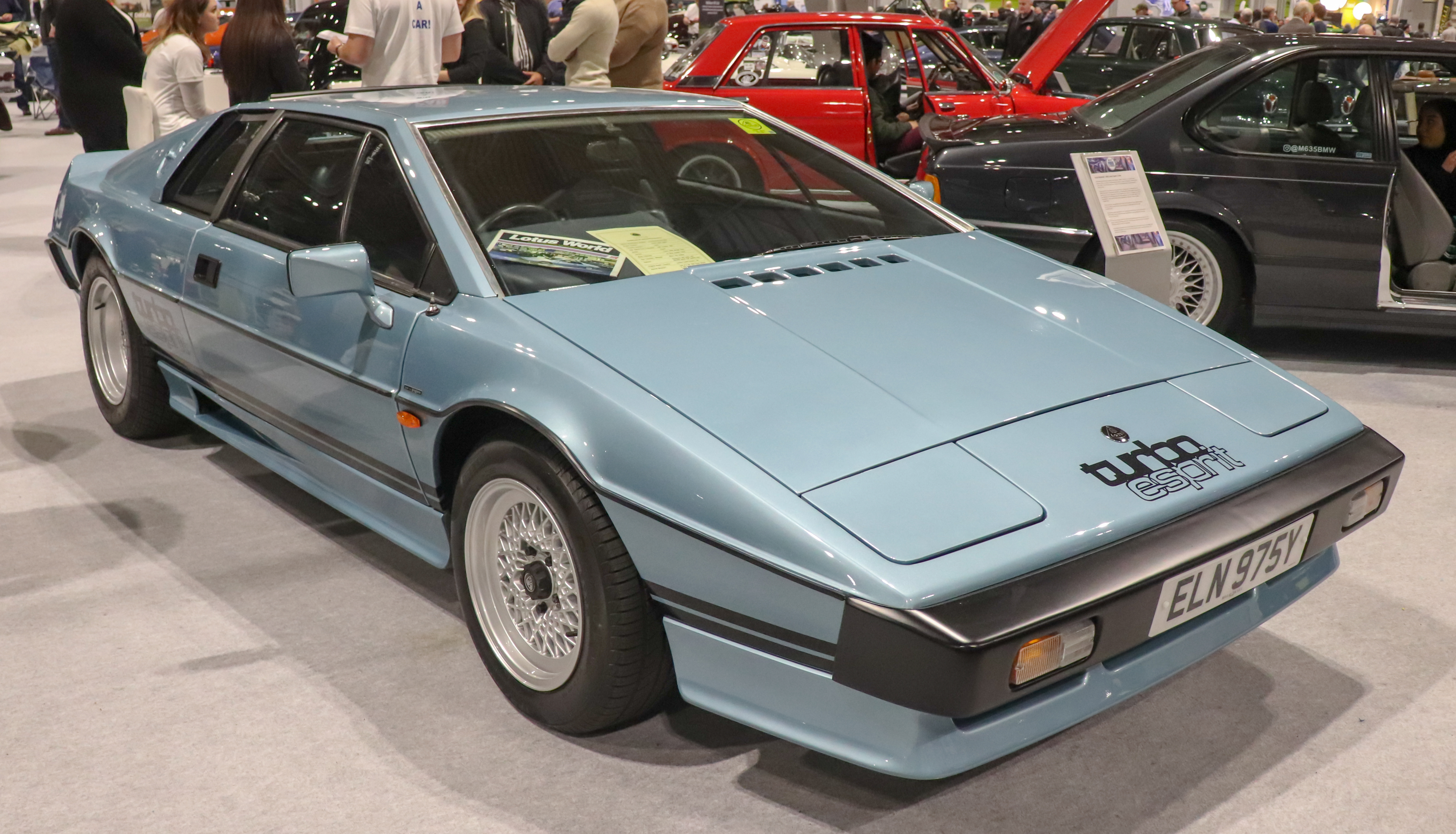
- 1983 Esprit 2.2 Turbo

Overview
- Production: 1982–1988; 3,041 produced

Body and chassis
- Related: DMC DeLorean

Powertrain
- Engine: 2.2 L (2,174 cc) Type 912 I4; 2.2 L (2,174 cc) type 910/910S turbo I4
- Transmission: 5-speed Citroën C35 manual

Dimensions
- Wheelbase: 2,440 mm (96.1 in)
- Length: 4,320 mm (170.1 in)
- Width: 1,860 mm (73.2 in)
- Height: 1,110–1,120 mm (43.7–44.1 in)
- Kerb weight: 1,067 kg (2,352 lb)

The Series 3 (or S3) and Turbo Esprit debuted in April 1981. The two models shared a common chassis, and bodywork was based on a common set of moulds.

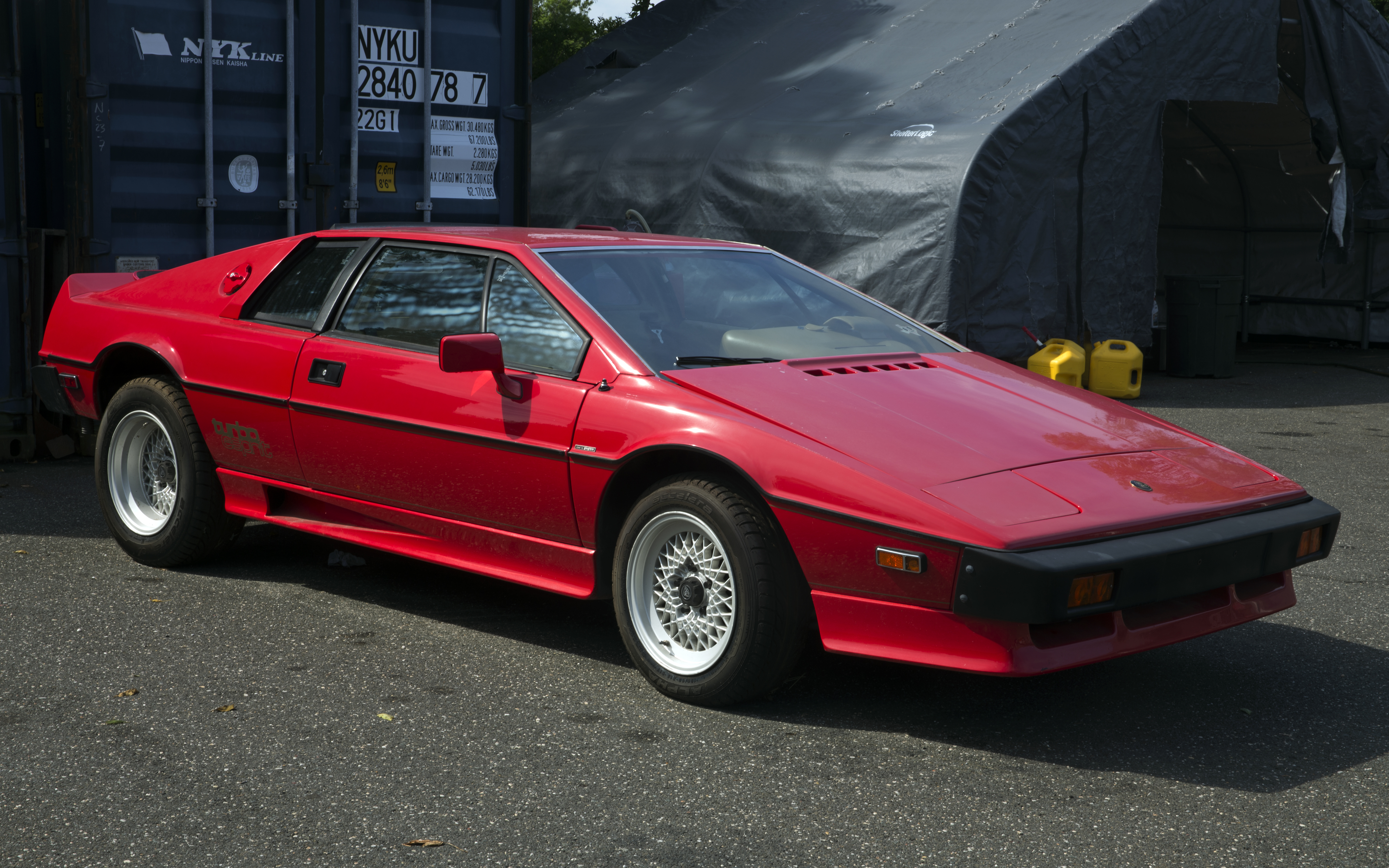
1985 Lotus Turbo Esprit (North America)

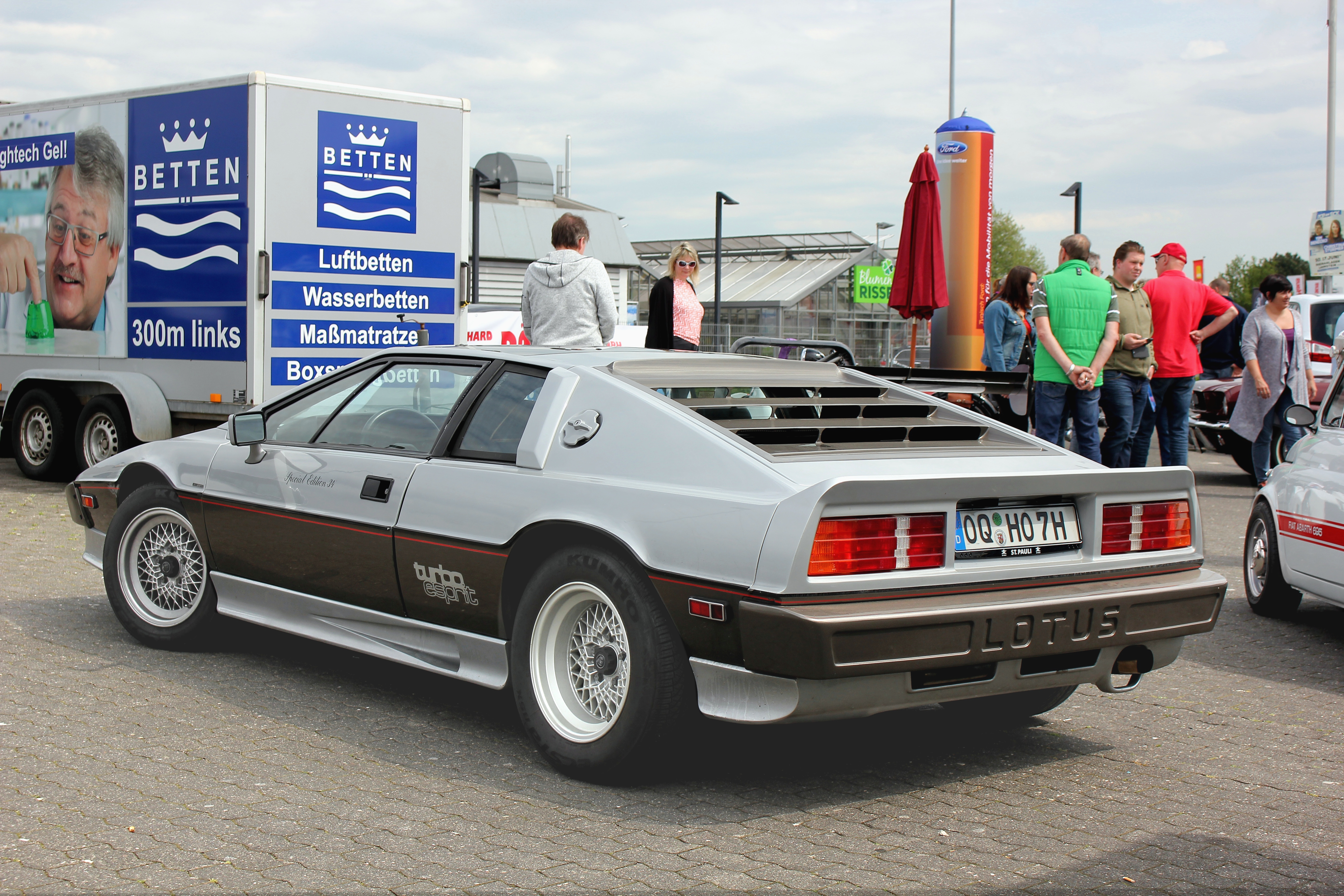
S3 "Special Edition"

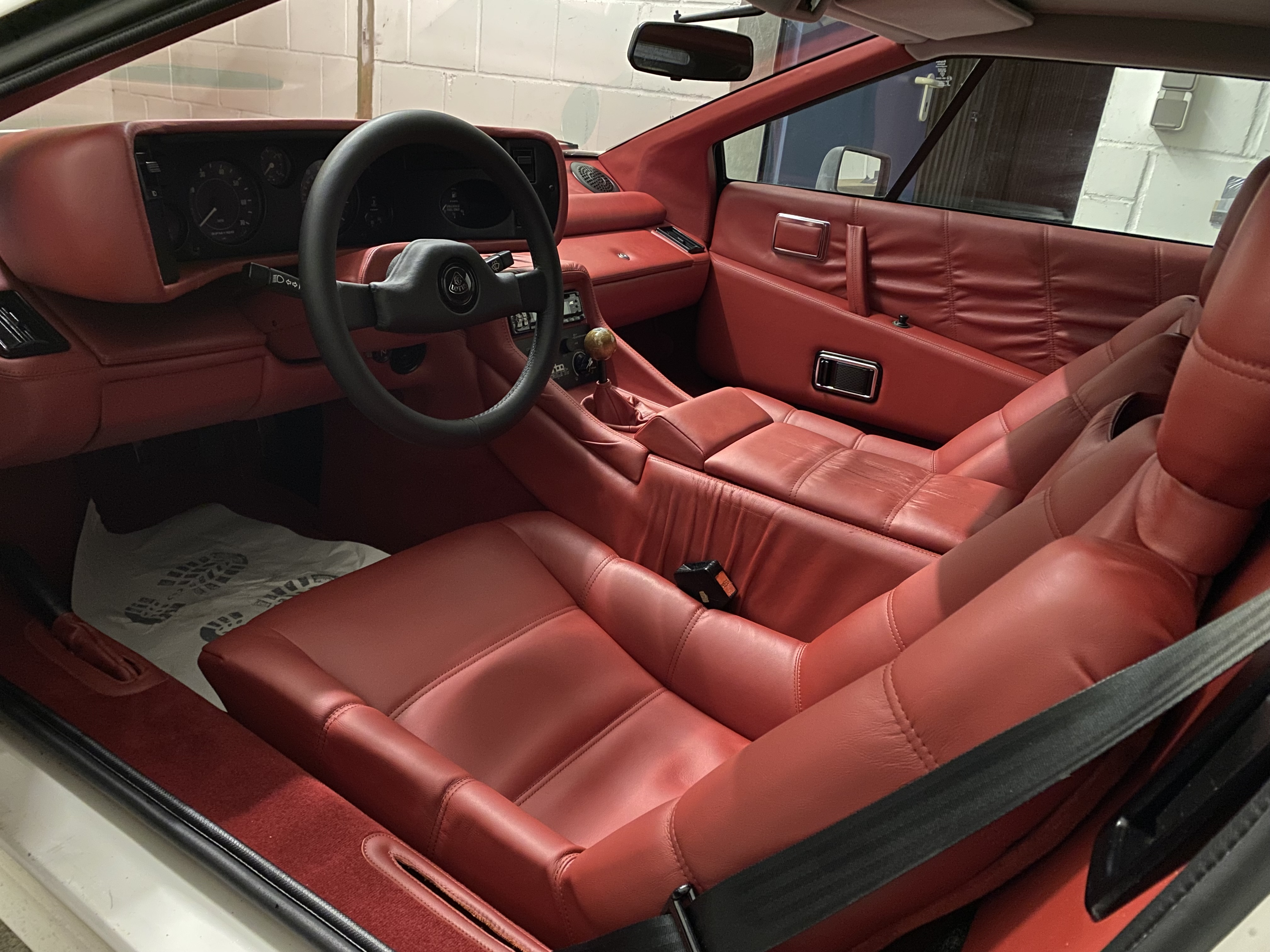
Lotus Esprit Turbo Interior

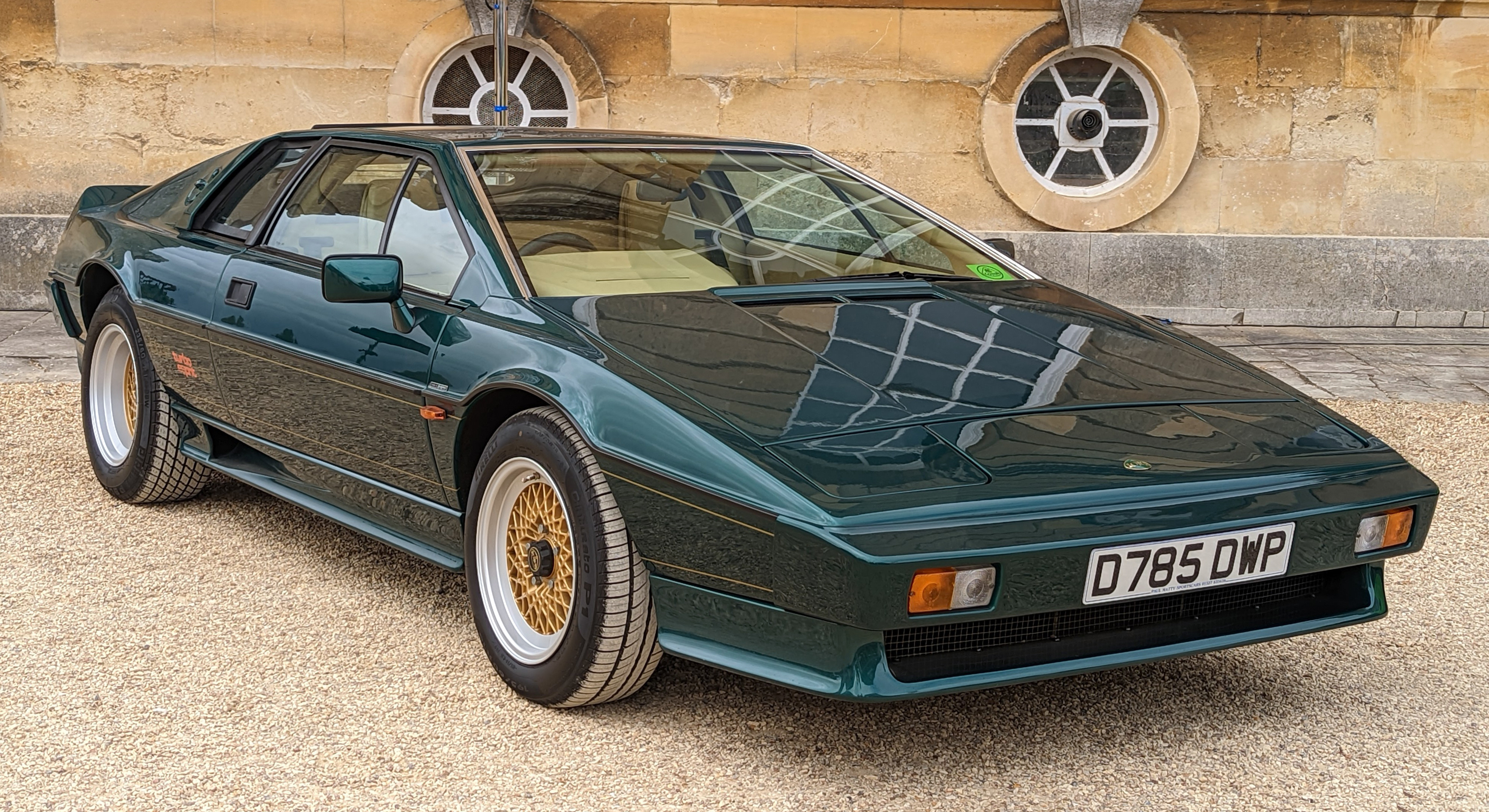
1987 Lotus Esprit Turbo

The S3 received the 2.2 L Type 912 engine. The Turbo Esprit had a wet sump engine with the same power and torque output as its dry sump predecessor. Interior trim was revised which, when combined with changes to the body moulds, resulted in more headroom and an enlarged foot-well. The Turbo Esprit retained the aerodynamic body kit of the Essex cars and featured prominent 'turbo esprit' decals on the nose and sides. The S3 gained the new larger bumpers but kept the simpler sill line and glazed rear hatch of the S2.2 body. Both cars came with 381 mm (15 in) BBS alloy wheels. One interesting omission was that the Esprit S3 had no cigarette lighter as standard equipment; ashtrays are tucked away in the door sills.

Minor changes were made to bodywork and front suspension for the 1985 model year.

The final incarnations of the Giugiaro-styled Esprit were announced in April 1986. Higher compression ratios for the engines was indicated by the 'HC' moniker. Power output of the naturally aspirated engine rose to 172 PS (127 kW; 170 hp) and 160 lb⋅ft (217 N⋅m) for the Esprit HC, and to 218 PS (160 kW; 215 hp) and 298 N⋅m (220 lb⋅ft) for the Turbo Esprit HC, with more torque available at lower engine speeds.

For markets with stringent emissions requirements like the United States, Lotus introduced the first fuel-injected Esprits. The HCi variant added Bosch KE-Jetronic fuel injection and a catalytic converter to the Turbo HC engine. This engine had the same peak power as the carburetted version but at a somewhat higher engine speed. Torque dropped to 274 N⋅m (202 lb⋅ft).

== X180 (1988) and derivatives ==
X180
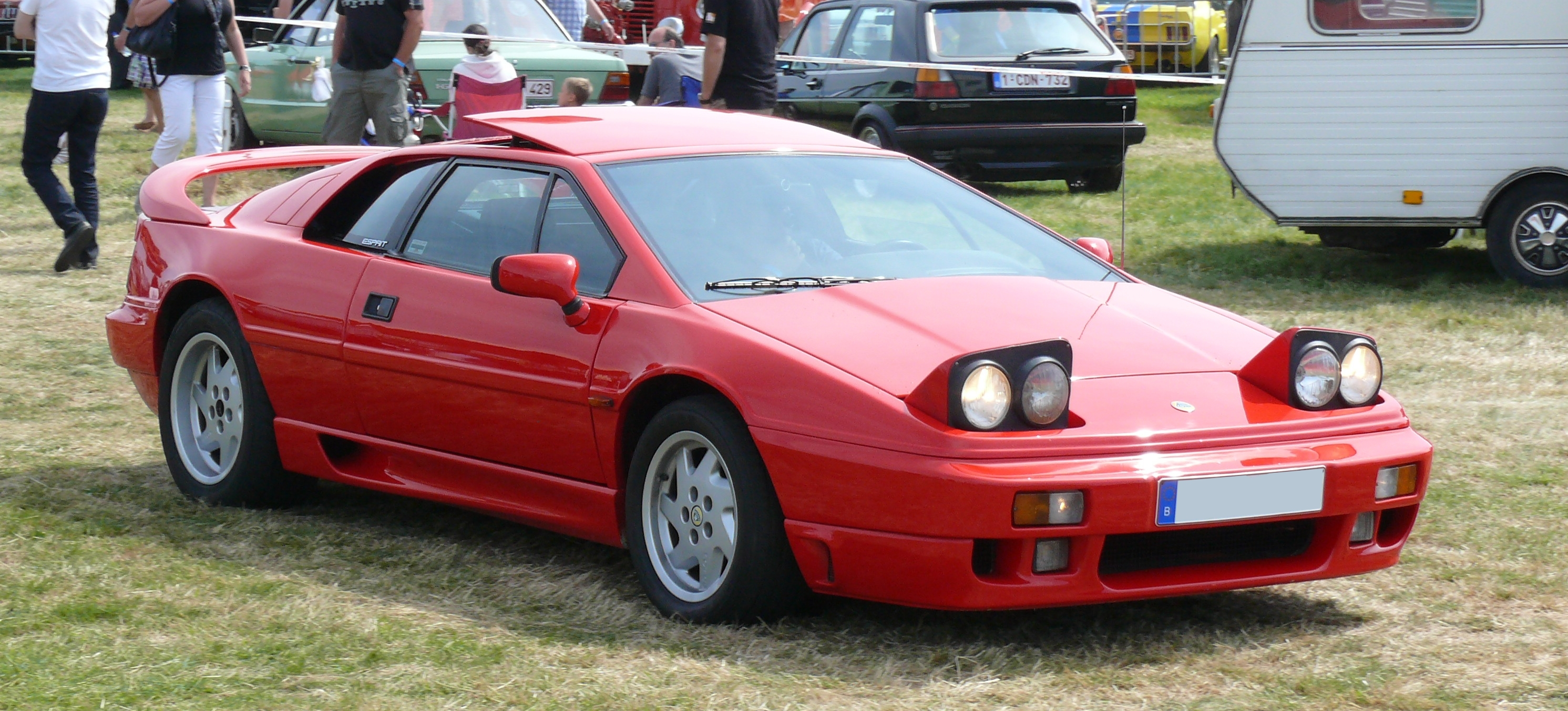

Overview
- Production: 1988–1994; 1,672 produced
- Designer: Peter Stevens

Powertrain
- Engine: 2.0 L (1,994 cc) type 920 turbo I4 (Italy only); 2.2 L (2,174 cc) Type 912 I4; 2.2 L (2,174 cc) Types 910 and 910S turbo I4
- Transmission: 5-speed Citroën C35 manual; 5-speed Renault UN-1 manual

Dimensions
- Wheelbase: 2,459 mm (96.8 in)
- Length: 4,331 mm (170.5 in)
- Width: 1,859 mm (73.2 in)
- Height: 1,138 mm (44.8 in)
- Kerb weight: 1,270 kg (2,800 lb)

In 1987, the Esprit was restyled by British designer Peter Stevens. Stevens, who would later style the Gordon Murray designed McLaren F1, produced a less angular, more rounded Esprit. Giugiaro is said to have liked the new shape, claiming it was perhaps too close to his original design. The exterior changes were accompanied by a redesign of the interior that gave more space to the occupants. The revised Esprit was not given a new "Series" number but is often called by its project code of X180.

Panels for the body were produced using a new process called VARI (Vacuum Assisted Resin Injection). This method, which was patented by Lotus, offered advantages over the previous hand lay-up process. Kevlar reinforcement was added to the roof and sides for roll-over protection. This contributed to a 22% increase in the Esprit's torsional rigidity. The new rectangular taillights were borrowed over from the 1983-1985 Toyota Corolla Levin AE86.

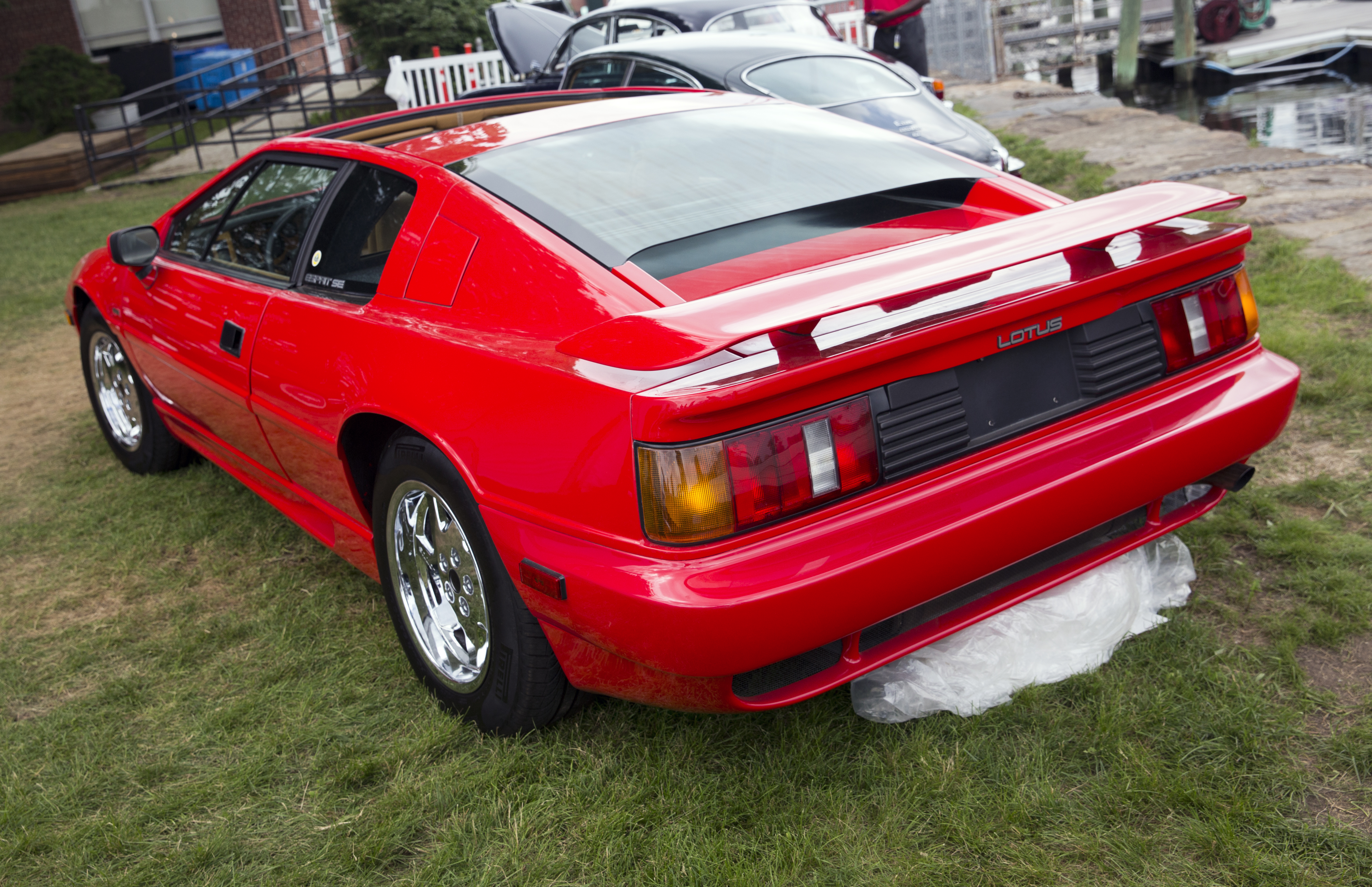
1991 Lotus Esprit Turbo SE (US)

The X180 cars inherited most of their mechanical components from the earlier HC Esprit and Turbo Esprit, although the name for the forced induction model was now Esprit Turbo. 1988 model year North American Esprit Turbo models kept the Citroën transaxle and Bosch fuel injection system used in the previous model year. Other X180 models received a new Renault UN-1 transaxle, which necessitated a move to outboard rear brakes.

Power output of the Type 910 turbocharged engine was unchanged, but 0–97 km/h (60 mph) acceleration times decreased from 5.6 seconds to between 5.4 and 5.1 seconds. Top speed was over 150 mph (240 km/h).

In 1989, the K-Jetronic system was replaced with a Lotus/Delco multi-point fuel injection (MPFI) system. The engine also received an air-water-air intercooler called a Chargecooler by Lotus. This revised engine was known as the Type 910S. Power output was up to 268 PS (197 kW; 264 hp) with 284 PS (209 kW; 280 hp) available on overboost. 0–97 km/h (60 mph) acceleration times decreased to 4.7 seconds and top speed was over 257 km/h (160 mph). The 910S engine went into the new Special Equipment (SE) model, which also received changes to the body, with side skirts parallel to the body, five air ducts in the front air dam, wing mirrors from the Citroën CX and the addition of a rear wing.

Lotus also produced the rarely seen Esprit S, a mid-range turbocharged variant offering fewer appointments and having a power output of 231 PS (170 kW; 228 hp), as well as the standard Turbocharged engine having a power output of 218 PS (160 kW; 215 hp) included as an option. Original normally aspirated (Esprit) and turbo (Esprit Turbo) models were discontinued after 1990. The S models were cancelled in 1991. A unique two-litre "tax special" Esprit with SE trim was developed for the Italian market. Equipped with an intercooled and turbocharged 1,994 cc (121.7 cu in) version of the 900-series engine that had a power output of 243 PS (179 kW; 240 hp) at 6,250 rpm, this model appeared in December 1991. This engine became available in other markets beginning in the fall of 1996.

=== X180R ===
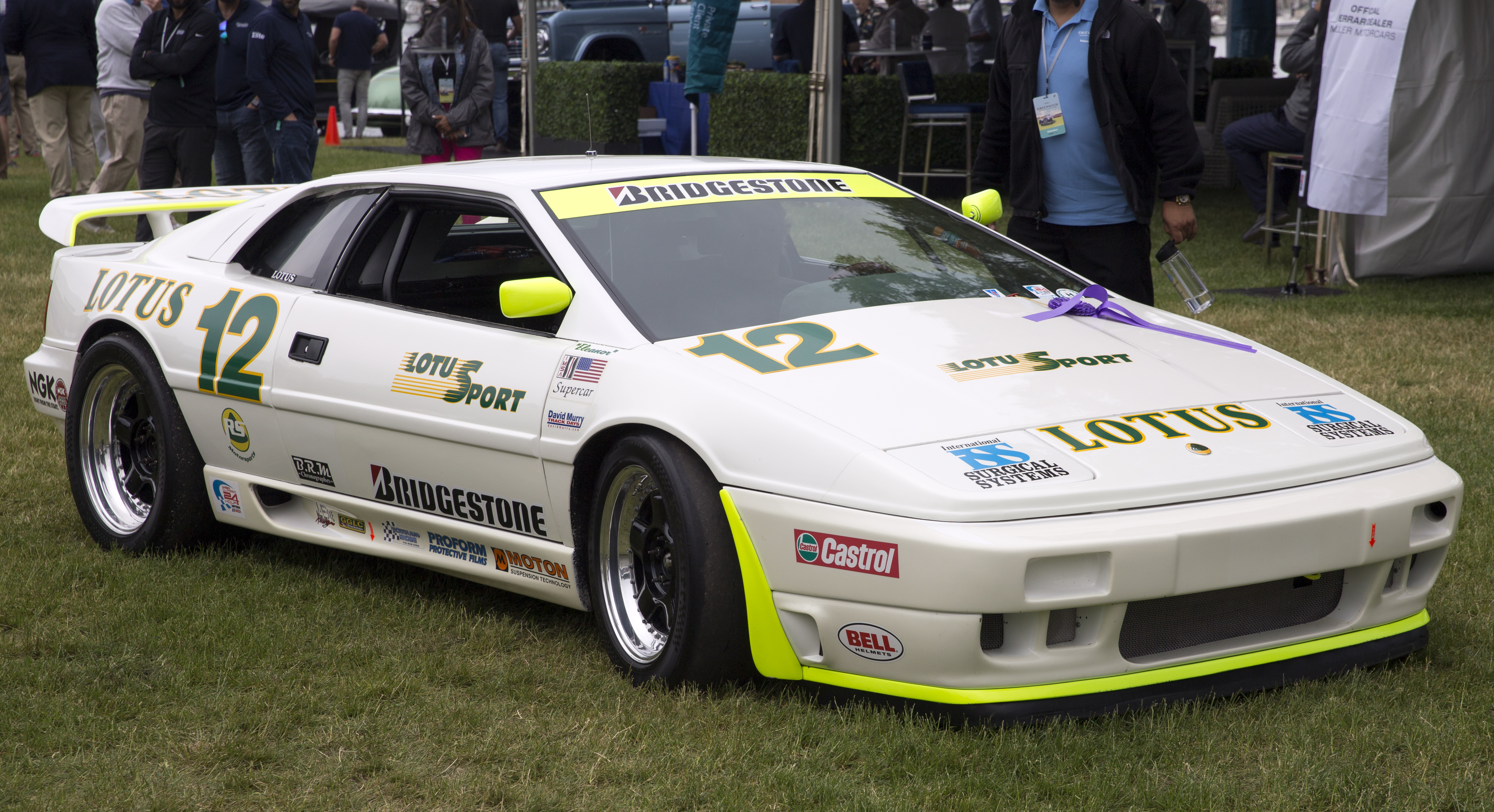
Lotus Esprit Type 105 (1990; the second car)

In 1990, two specially prepared Esprits competed in the SCCA Escort World Challenge series. These cars started out as regular SE models but had all unnecessary equipment, trim removed and glass replaced by plexiglass. The suspension geometry was revised and Monroe shock absorbers were added. The brakes were by AP Racing, and the car's Delco/Moraine ABS system was the first anti-lock braking system ever used on an Esprit. The Chargecooled Type 910S engine had a revised engine management system with larger fuel injectors and now had a power output of 290 PS (213 kW; 286 hp). These cars were designated Type 105 and were campaigned by the Pure Sports team headed by "Doc" Bundy, who helped with development. In the first season the car was able to claim six pole positions, win four races and post two one-two finishes.

Late in 1990, Lotus built 20 road-going examples of the Type 105 and gave them the name X180R. These were developed to homologate parts for the 1991 and 1992 racing seasons, specifically to allow an Esprit to campaign in IMSA's newly formed Bridgestone Supercar Championship. With a MSRP of $126,000, these cars came with amenities like glass windows, sport seats, a heater and air conditioning. The chassis of the road-going X180R was also galvanized, in contrast to the untreated chassis of the Type 105. The special road-going 1991 model year X180Rs were only sold within the United States. They were fitted with a full roll cage, reduced sound insulation, special bucket seats, competition-type disc brakes, synchromesh gearbox with limited-slip differential, 16" Revolution racing-style 3-piece wheels, special tuned suspension and shock package, racing-type front spoiler and rear wing, and competition type mirrors. The type 910S engine was developed to an officially reported 286 hp, though actual output is unknown.

Three more race cars were built for the 1991 season to be run by Lotus Sport alongside the two upgraded 105s in the American IMSA Bridgestone Supercar Championship. The new cars were designated Type 106, but adopted the X180R name as well. They had a reinforced chassis with a revised roll cage and larger wheels and tyres but weighed 136.1 kg (300 lb) less than the Type 105. The engine was modified with larger fuel injectors, a better Chargecooler and the removal of the catalytic converter which caused the output to rise to 305 PS (224 kW; 301 hp). In 1991 driver/actor Robert Carradine placed second in the series and in 1992, Bundy won three races and took the driver's title.

In 1993, the sanctioning body changed the rules such that the X180R was assessed a 136.1 kg (300 lb) weight penalty, which made the cars uncompetitive.

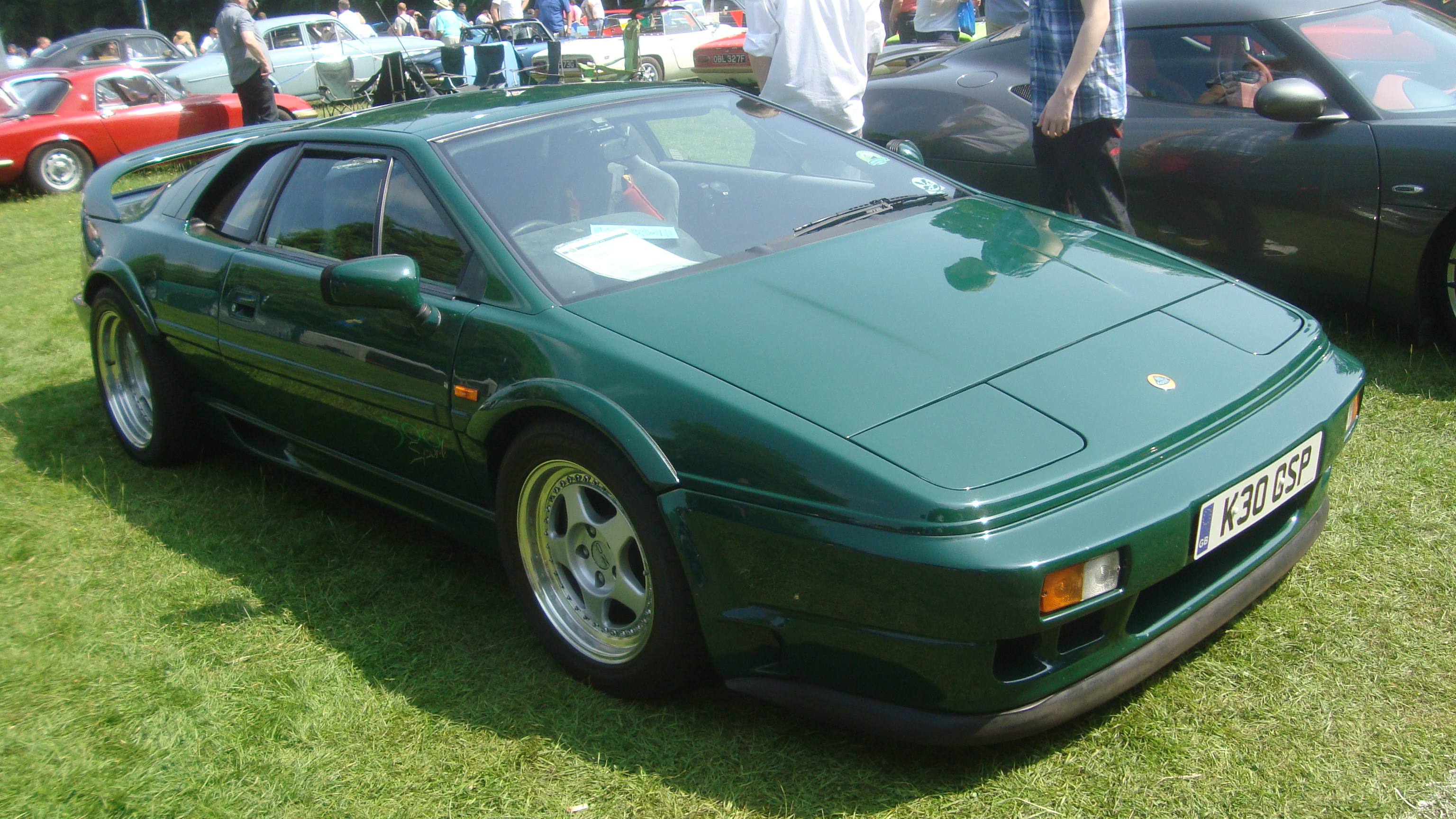
1993 Lotus Esprit Sport 300

An extensively modified derivative of the X180R was sold in Europe as the Sport 300. These are known as the fastest of the four-cylinder Esprits and among the most desirable with only 64 cars produced. The Sport 300 utilised a Garrett T4 turbocharger along with an improved Chargecooler and larger inlet valves enabling the engine to have a power output of 306 PS (225 kW; 302 hp) at 6,400 rpm and 389 N⋅m (287 lb⋅ft) of torque at 4,400 rpm. The power to weight ratio rose to 243 hp per tonne, same as the Porsche 964 Turbo 3.6. The Sport 300 could accelerate from 0–97 km/h (60 mph) in 4.7 seconds and had a claimed top speed of 270 km/h (168 mph) (tested top speed amounted to 259 km/h (161 mph) during a test conducted by British magazine Autocar in 1993).

Esprit sales and production fell sharply in 1991 and 1992 as the SE started to face newer competitors like the Honda NSX.

== S4 (1994) and derivatives ==
Series 4
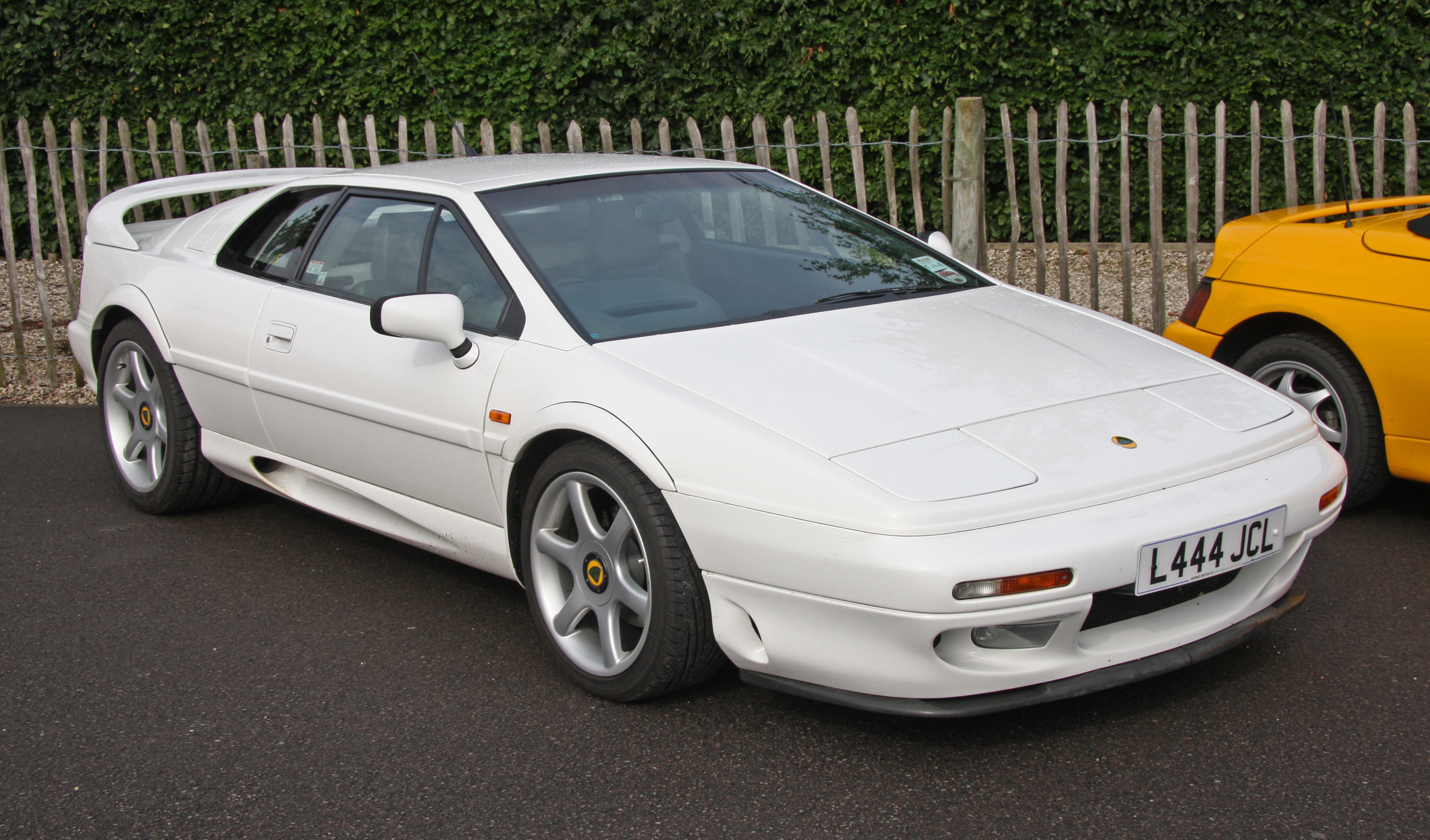
- Lotus Esprit S4 Sport

Overview
- Also called: Lotus Esprit V8
- Production: 1994–2004; 3,630 produced
- Designer: Julian Thomson

Body and chassis
- Related: Lotus Esprit GT1

Powertrain
- Engine: 2.0 L (1,994 cc) Type 920 turbo I4; 2.2 L (2,174 cc) Types 910 and 910S turbo I4; 3.5 L (3,506 cc) type 918 twin-turbo V8
- Transmission: 5-speed manual; 6-speed manual

Dimensions
- Wheelbase: 2,438 mm (96.0 in): 1993–2001; 2,421 mm (95.3 in): 2002–2004
- Length: 4,369 mm (172.0 in): 1993–1995 & 1999–2004; 4,415 mm (173.8 in):1996–1998
- Width: 1,867 mm (73.5 in): 1993–1995 & 1999–2001; 1,882 mm (74.1 in): 1996–1998 & 2002–2004
- Height: 1,151 mm (45.3 in)
- Kerb weight: 1,300–1,338 kg (2,866–2,950 lb)

Another refresh of the car in 1993 penned by Julian Thomson resulted in the Series 4 (or S4). Exterior changes included a smaller rear spoiler placed halfway up the rear deck-lid, revised front and rear bumpers, side skirts and valence panels. New five-spoke alloy wheels were also fitted. The taillights from the pre-facelift Toyota AE86 were carried over from the previous generation. The S4's engine had the same power output as the SE at 268 PS (197 kW; 264 hp). The S4 was the first Esprit to use power steering.

The S4 was complemented in 1994 by the S4 Sport (S4s). The most obvious external change from the S4 was the addition of a rear wing from the Sport 300. The engine was still a 2.2 L 910-series, but with performance-enhancing modifications that included enlarged inlet ports, cylinder head modifications, a re-calibrated ECM and a revised turbocharger. Engine output rose to 305 PS (224 kW; 301 hp) and 393 N⋅m (290 lb⋅ft) of torque. Top speed was 270 km/h (168 mph), slalom speed 99.3 km/h (61.7 mph), lateral acceleration increased to 0.91g and 0–97 km/h (60 mph) took 4.6 seconds.

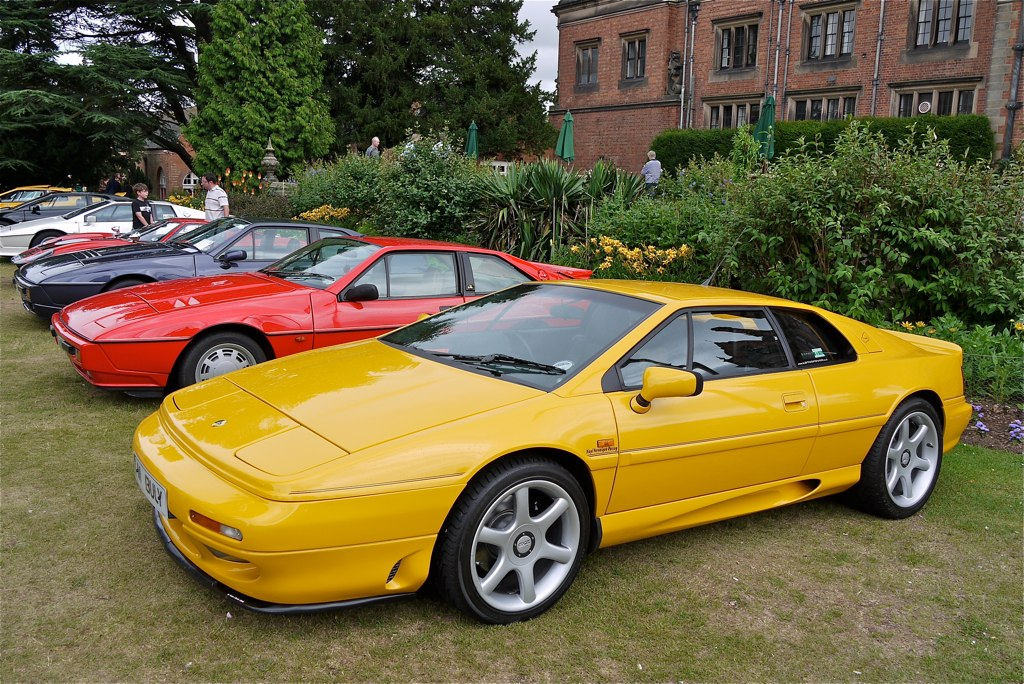
1998 Lotus Esprit GT3

The last iteration of the four-cylinder Esprit was the GT3, a turbocharged, Chargecooled variant with the 2.0 L Type 920 which had previously been used only in Italian market cars. The GT3 was produced alongside the Esprit V8. Lotus originally intended to produce 50 GT3 models, but following the car's popularity, a total of 190 units were eventually built. The interior of the GT3 featured a re-designed instrument binnacle, which was narrower and more focused than the design used for previous models. Other notable interior features included a milled steel gearshift knob and a colour coded central tunnel to complement it.

=== V8 (1996) ===
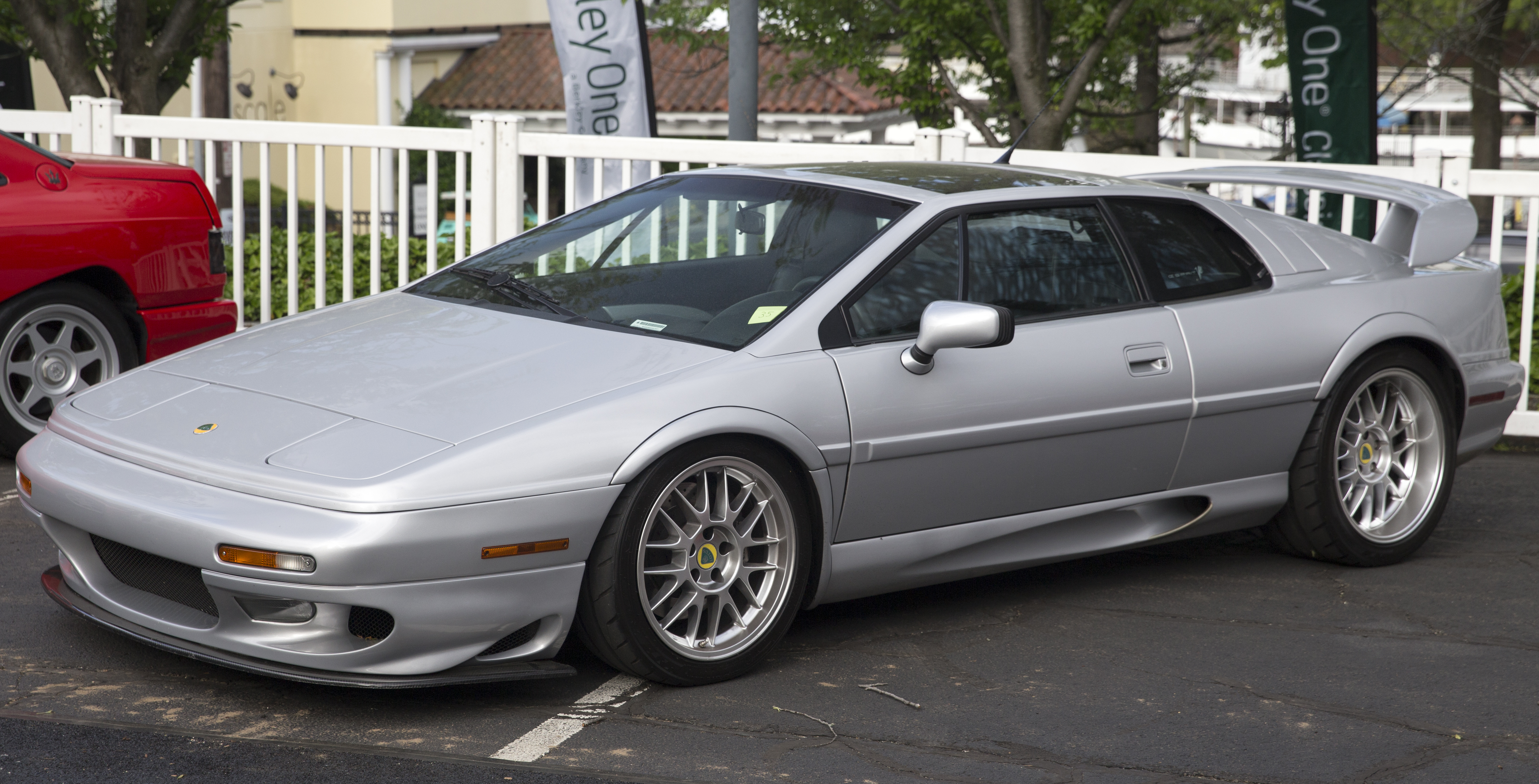
Lotus Esprit V8 (final facelift model)

In 1996, Lotus launched the Esprit V8. The car came equipped with Lotus' own Type 918 V8 engine. The engine is an all-aluminium 90° DOHC 4 valves per cylinder with a flat-plane crankshaft and two Garrett T25/60 turbochargers but with no Chargecooler. The transaxle used was the same Renault unit as before but upgraded by Lotus. Despite having a modified transaxle, the Type 918 engine was detuned from a potential 507 PS (373 kW; 500 hp) to 355 PS (261 kW; 350 hp) to prevent gearbox damage. In period tests, acceleration from 0–97 km/h (60 mph) was achieved in 4.1 seconds, with a 1/4 mile (402 m) of 12.7s at 180 km/h (112 mph). The top speed is 280 km/h (174 mph).

In 1998, the V8 range was split into SE and GT models. Both cars had revised interiors and similar performance with the SE being the more luxurious of the two and the GT being more lightweight and performance focused.

The highest performance version of the Esprit was the 1999 Sport 350. A total of 50 were made. the ECU in the Sport 350 was remapped to have the same Lotus type 918 power output of 350 horsepower (per the name), but in different rpm / gear range (turbo spool characteristics) compared to the normal SE/GT sales version and had chassis, body and braking improvements that included thinner fibre layer in the body, AP Racing brakes and stiffer springs . Among the visual changes was a large carbon fibre rear wing on aluminium uprights in place of the standard fibreglass rear wing. The Sport 350 weighed 1,300 kg (2,866 lb) and could accelerate to 97 km/h (60 mph) in 4.3 seconds and to 161 km/h (100 mph) in under 10 seconds.

=== GT1 ===
Having raced the Esprit in GT2 and GT3 classes, Lotus began to develop a new version of the car to race in GT1 class racing. Development of the car was entrusted to the newly formed Lotus GT1 Engineering group, which included many staff from the recently dissolved Team Lotus Formula One team.

The Esprit GT1 was built on the Type 114 platform using the body from the new S4 road-going Esprit made from composite materials and carbon fibre. Changes to the bodywork included a new carbon fibre splitter, diffuser and floor. Power came from a Type 918 V8 engine with a single Garrett T4 turbocharger that had a power output of 557 PS (410 kW; 549 hp). The Renault transaxle was not considered adequate for the task. Where the GT2 cars used Hewland DG300 units, the GT1 would use the new TGT200 6-speed transverse transaxle. The front suspension was now upper and lower A-arms, while at the rear were upper and lower lateral links paired with upper and lower trailing links. The braking system used AP Racing carbon ceramic discs and calipers, and Penske triple-adjustable gas-pressurised shock absorbers were used at all four wheels. The chassis was similar to the production Esprit but with a roll-cage that added stiffness. Weight was reduced to 900 kg (1,984 lb).

Production amounted to 3 units: chassis 114-001, 114-002 and 114-003. Two cars debuted at the 1996 BPR Global GT Series 4 Hours of Donington. Reliability dogged the car throughout the year, with problems linked to brakes, oil pumps, oil pipes and overheating, and it was succeeded by the Type 115 Elise GT1 the next year. Two of the Esprit GT1 cars were converted to GT2 specifications. Chassis 114-001 was acquired by Mike Haines Racing, who developed it into a competitive GT2 car. Chassis 114-001 now resides in a private museum in Tokyo, Japan. Chassis 114-002 was damaged at Oulton Park and became a parts donor for the remaining cars. Chassis 114-003 was destroyed in a fire.

== Final redesign and end of production ==
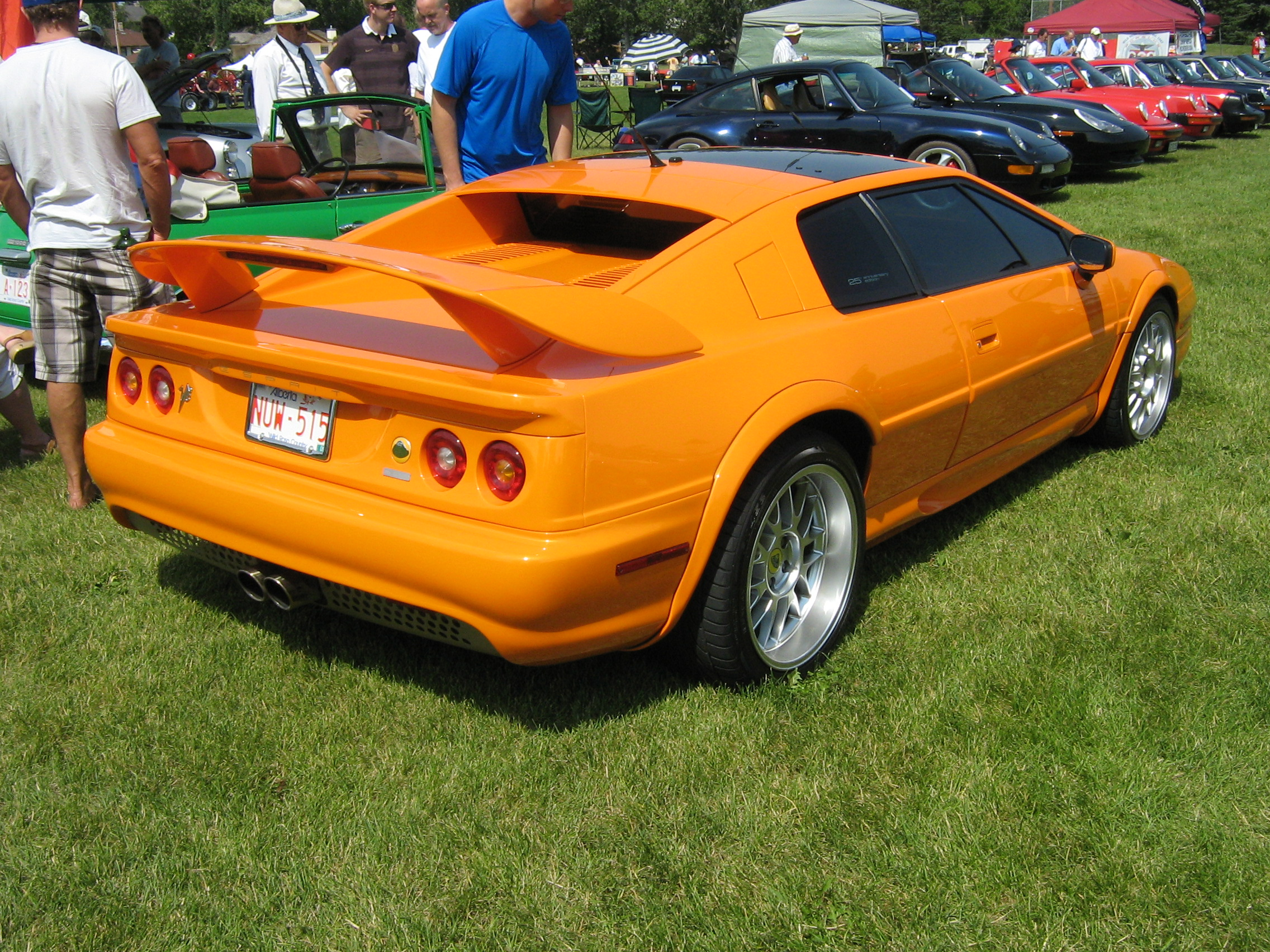
Lotus Esprit V8 (2002 redesign)

In 2002, the Esprit received another styling update done by future Lotus Design head Russell Carr. Carr, who had contributed to the S4 update, revised the car with changes that included replacing the pre-facelift Toyota AE86 taillights with a new design that incorporated the same round taillights as the Lotus Elise S2. Few, if any, mechanical changes were made to the car.

After a 28-year production run, the last Esprit rolled off the production line on February 20, 2004, and was shipped to Chicago. A total of 10,675 Esprits were produced. Alongside the Chevrolet Corvette C5 (which ended production on July 2, 2004), the Esprit was one of the last cars produced with retractable pop-up headlights.

== Esprit type numbers and production numbers ==
Type number	Model(s)	Years	Production
79	S1	1976–1978	718
79	S2	1978–1981	1061
79	S2.2	1980–1981	88
82	NA and HC	1980–1987	3155
82	Turbo	1981–1987	2909
85	S3	1981–1987	732
85	Esprit (naturally aspirated)	1988–1992	366
85	Turbo SE	1987–1993	1608
85	S4	1992–1996	625
85	Sport 300	1992–1995	64
85	S4s	1994–1997	367
85	GT3	1996–1999	190
85	V8	1994–2004	1237
85	V8 GT	1997–2001	204
85	Sport 350	1999–2001	42
105	X180-R	1990	2 (track)
105	X180-R	1990	20 (road)
106	X180-R1	1991	3
114	GT1	1995	3

== Esprit convertibles ==
While Lotus Cars never developed or built a convertible Esprit, custom manufacturers stepped in to fill this market.

=== St. Tropez ===
The St. Tropez conversion was designed by Paul Bailey and his company PBB Design, which was established in 1987. The conversion involved removing the roof and rear bodywork. The wheel arches were also widened and new Compomotive wheels were part of the package. The A-pillar and the chassis were reinforced with steel, and a steel subframe was added in the rear.

PBB Design built three cars before the moulds were sold to Mark Irwin's Esprit Developments, who updated the design and marketed it along with a Rover V8 conversion. Esprit Developments completed another three cars.

=== Esprit Roadster ===
Another Esprit convertible was built in Hamburg Germany by Autohaus Kollinger GMBH. Their Esprit Roadster was based on S2, S3 & Turbo Esprit donor cars.

== Styling concept (2010) ==
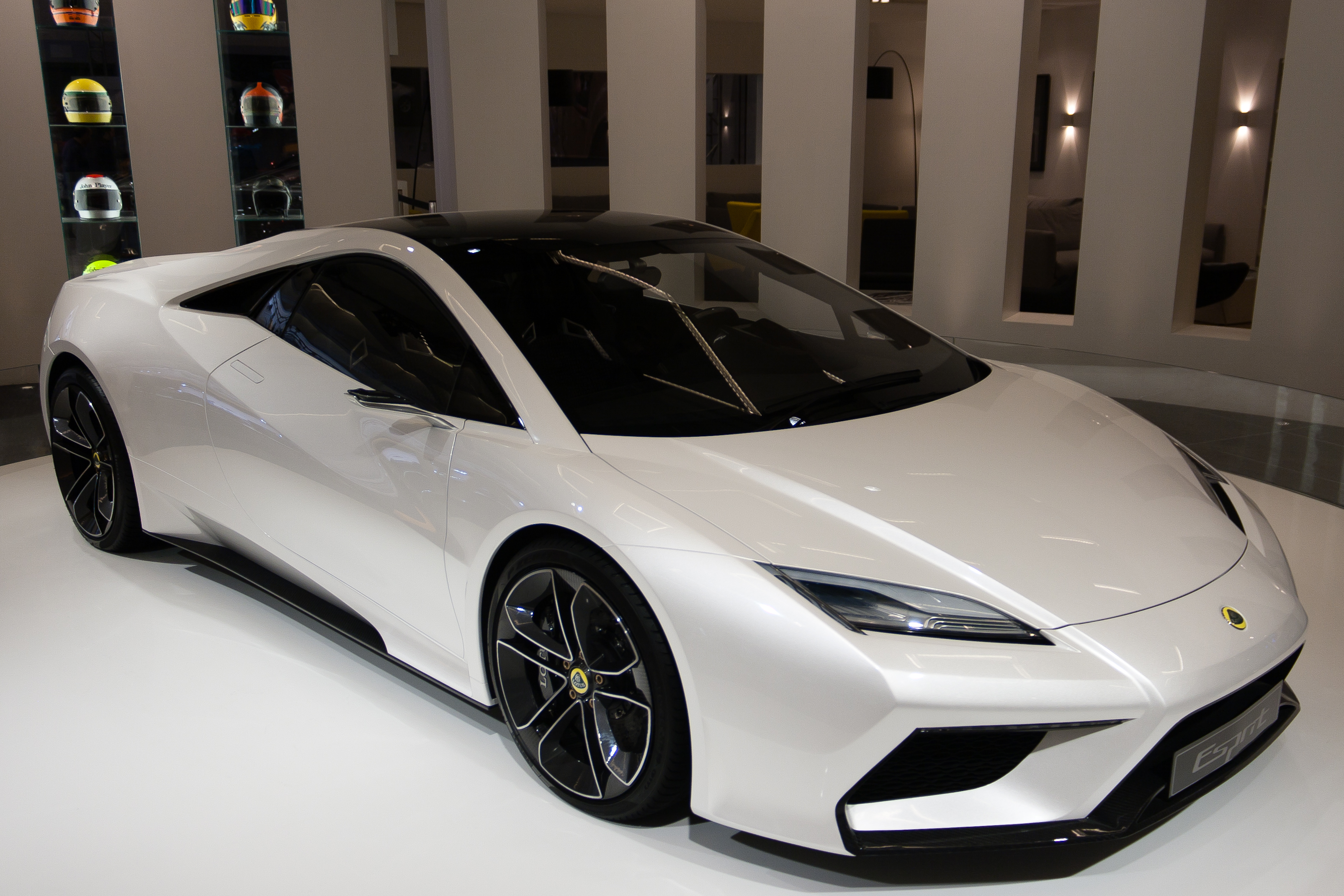
Front view of the proposed 2014 Lotus Esprit styling model

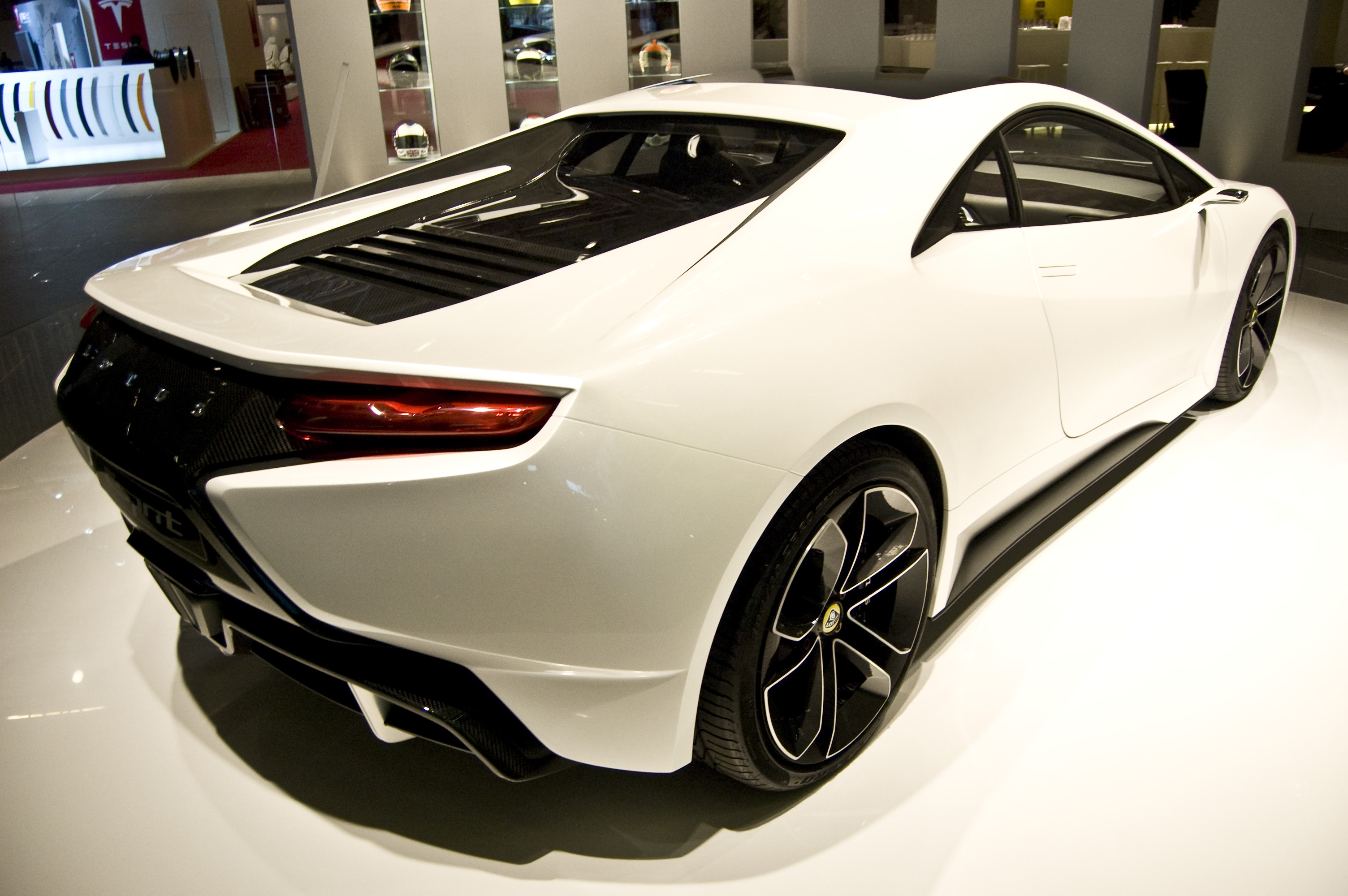
Rear view of the proposed 2014 Lotus Esprit styling model

As part of a five-car announcement at the 2010 Paris Motor Show, Lotus unveiled a completely redesigned Esprit. Production was slated to start in late 2013 and sales in the spring of 2014.

Work on a new Esprit had started as early as 2006 under Carr. The car was unveiled during Donato Coco's tenure as design chief and was to have featured a futuristic front-end with LED front daytime running lights and a centre-mounted dual exhaust system in the rear. Power was to come from a 5.0 litre Lexus V8 engine delivering up to 620 PS (456 kW; 612 hp) through a 7-speed dual-clutch transaxle, giving a 0-60 time of 3.5 seconds and a top speed of 195 mph. A KERS system was to be optional. The interior was to have a futuristic but minimal design which included a digital instrument cluster, a sport steering wheel and carbon fibre trim scattered throughout the cabin. The design exhibited had a length of 4,550 mm (179 in), a width of 1,950 mm (77 in) and a height of 1,250 mm (49 in). Gross weight was stated to be around 1,495 kg (3,296 lb).

On 29 September 2014 Lotus cancelled the project and announced that they would not make the Esprit. Lotus had decided to continue making lightweight cars and nimble cars instead of heavier and more expensive cars due to the company's financial position at the time.

== Encor Series 1 (2026) ==
The Encor Series 1 is a ground-up "remastered" restomod of the Lotus Esprit, crafted by UK-based firm Encor. Limited to 50 hand-built vehicles, the company takes late-model Esprit V8 donor cars and re-engineers them with lighter carbon-fibre bodywork, upgraded mechanicals and a thoroughly modernised interior.

The twin-turbo 3.5L V8 engines engines are heavily reworked to produce 405 PS (399 hp; 298 kW).

== Esprit designers ==
=== Giorgetto Giugiaro ===
- Esprit – 1976–78
- Esprit S2 – 1978–81
- Esprit JPS (John Player Special) – 1978–79
- Esprit JPS ("JPS Mario Andretti Edition") - 1979
- Esprit S2.2 – 1980–81
- Essex Turbo Esprit – 1980
- Esprit S3 – 1981–86
- Turbo Esprit – 1981–86
- Esprit S3 HC – 1986–87
- Turbo Esprit HC – 1986–87
- Turbo Esprit HCi – 1986–87

=== Peter Stevens ===
- Esprit N/A – Oct 1987- Oct 1990 (model years 1988–1990)
- Esprit Turbo – Oct 1987- Oct 1991 (model years 1988–1992)
- Esprit SE – 1989–1991
- Esprit S – 1991
- Esprit X180R - 1991-1992
- Esprit SE HighWing – 1992–1993

=== Julian Thomson ===
- Esprit Sport 300 – 1993
- Esprit S4 – 1993–96
- Esprit S4s – 1995–96
- Esprit GT3 – 1996–99
- Esprit V8 – 1996–98
- Esprit V8-GT – 1998–2001
- Esprit V8-SE – 1998–2001
- Esprit Sport 350 – 1999

=== Russell Carr ===
- Esprit V8 – 2002–04

== Parts commonality ==
Lotus used a variety of parts from other cars to reduce development costs. Esprits built before 1993 used many British Leyland parts and those built in the mid-to-late 1980s incorporated more Toyota parts while those built after 1993 had many GM (Vauxhall, Opel) parts. Door handles from the Morris Marina/Austin Allegro were used until the S4 model in 1994 when GM Calibra door handles were used. Early cars used a Momo steering wheel, while later ones had the same airbag-equipped wheel as the Pontiac Trans Am. Headlight lift motors came from the Pontiac Fiero. The aerial mount and whip on the S4 and V8 was the same as the GM Calibra and Tigra. The side mirrors were from the Citroën CX. Non-SE fog lamps from about 1989 were GM Astra Mk1. The fan motors came from the Ford Fiesta Mk2.

The GT3's Brembo front brake pads were the same as on a Fiat Coupé Turbo and the Peugeot 406 3.0 V6. The SE's fuel pump was from the Renault Fuego, while the V8's pistons are from the Renault Clio Williams' 16-valve, 2-litre F7P engine. The alternator on the V8 models was a standard GM unit also found in the V6 Opel Omega B and the earlier Lotus Carlton/Omega, which also provided interior plastic fittings such as door handles and steering column covering. The clutch master and slave cylinders on 1998 and newer models were Girling parts shared with the series 2A Land Rover. The S1 and S2 shared some front suspension components with the Opel Ascona.

== Motorsports ==
- Doc Bundy won the 1992 IMSA Bridgestone Supercar Championship drivers title with the Esprit X180R. The Esprit has been used by Thorkild Thyrring to win his class in the 1993 and 1994 British GT Championship, and also driven by Richard Piper, Peter Hardman and Olindo Iacobelli, competing in the 1993 and 1994 24 Hours of Le Mans.
- Brad Jones won the 1994 Australian Super Production Car Series driving an Esprit.

== Notable appearances in film ==
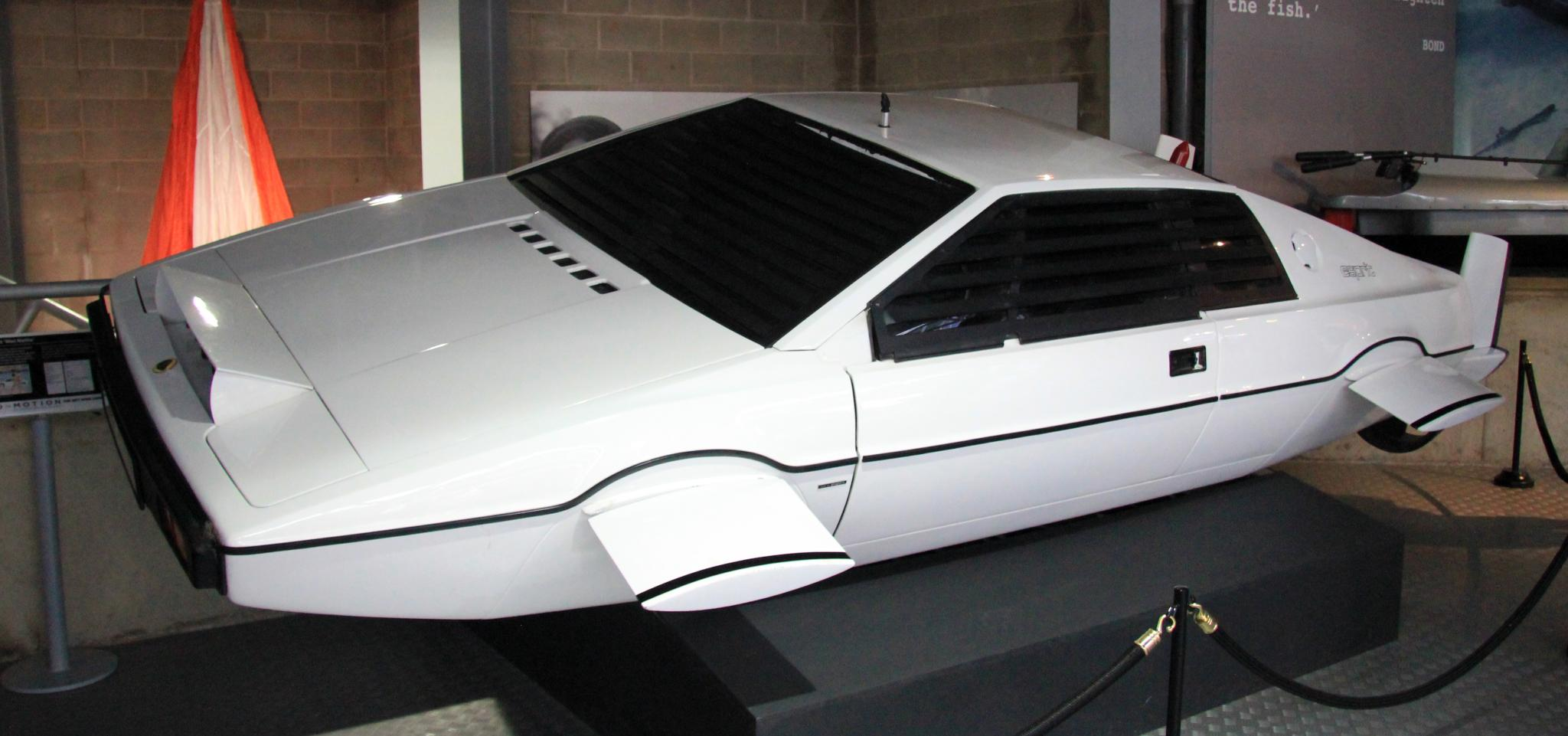
1977 S1 in "submarine" mode, as seen in The Spy Who Loved Me

- An S1 Esprit was featured in the 1977 James Bond film The Spy Who Loved Me, where a car famously converted into a submarine after a road chase. The car used in the underwater scenes, nick-named "Wet Nellie", was bought by Elon Musk in September 2013.
- Two Essex-spec Turbo Esprits were featured in the James Bond film For Your Eyes Only. A white one destroyed early in the film and a copper-red model appearing later.
- An X180 Esprit appeared in the film Pretty Woman after Ferrari and Porsche declined the product placement opportunity because the manufacturers did not want to be associated with soliciting prostitutes. Lotus saw the placement value with such a major feature film and supplied a Silver 1989.5 Esprit SE.
- An X180 Esprit appeared in the film Basic Instinct. The car was featured in two major scenes in the film: a high-speed highway chase between Michael Douglas' Detective Curran and Sharon Stone's Catherine Tramell, and a second scene where Catherine's lover Roxy (Leilani Sarelle) tries to run Curran down, but ends up totalling the car and killing herself.

== See also ==
- Lotus Esprit Turbo Challenge, early 1990s video game on the Amiga computer.
- Pegasus WSC, a short-lived IMSA GT Championship car based on the Esprit.
- Turbo Esprit, 1986 video game
