= Saboteur (1985 video game) =

Saboteur!
- Publisher: Durell Software
- Designer: Clive Townsend
- Programmers: Clive Townsend; Branko Spoljaric (C64)
- Platforms: ZX Spectrum, Commodore 64, Amstrad CPC, Commodore 16, Plus/4; Enhanced version iOS, Android, Switch, Windows
- Release: 1985: Original; 2017: Enhanced version
- Genres: Action-adventure, stealth
- Mode: Single-player

Saboteur! is a stealth action-adventure game created by Clive Townsend and published by Durell Software in 1985 for several 8-bit home computer formats.

In 2017, Clive Townsend, in association with realtech VR, released an enhanced version of Saboteur! for PC, iOS and Android devices. The game was released in November 2018 for Nintendo Switch.

== Gameplay ==
The player is set in the role of an anonymous ninja, tasked with getting into a warehouse to steal a floppy disk which has the names of rebel leaders on it. The player must navigate through the complex of rooms (consisting of the warehouse, dark tunnels and the secret command centre) to find the disk and escape. The player has an energy bar which is depleted by falling too far, crouching under water or being attacked. If the energy bar is completely depleted or if time runs out, the game ends. The bar can be replenished by standing still and resting in a safe area.

The saboteur can crouch, climb ladders, run and attack enemies by punching and drop-kicking them. He begins with a single shuriken as a weapon and can also utilise improvised weapons (such as bricks and pieces of pipe) found in rubbish piles and boxes around the warehouse. The warehouse contains many security systems the player will need to defeat or avoid. These include guards (who can use hand to hand combat and guns) who stand still and will chase and attack the saboteur if they see him or if he makes too much sound. The guards are assisted by guard dogs and automatic gun emplacements.

Saboteur! also has a difficulty level selection that can be chosen before a game begins. The chosen difficulty level determines how many guards are on watch, how much time the saboteur has to complete his mission, and how easy the route to the disk and helicopter will be (i.e. how many security doors on the way are locked and will need to be opened in some way).

== Development ==
Saboteur! was based on routines and ideas from Clive Townsend's Death Pit, a game that was cancelled before development on Saboteur started. The prototype for Death Pit has been recovered and made available at World of Spectrum.

== Reception ==
Reception

Review scores
Publication	Score
Crash	93%
Computer and Video Games	37/40
Sinclair User	5/5
Your Sinclair	9/10
Computer Gamer	19/20

Awards
Publication	Award
Your Sinclair	Megagame
Crash	Smash

CRASH noted the sound, and the range of movements available, and concluded it is "one of the better releases on the Spectrum this year". C+VG said it was "a winner". The game was also voted number 55 in the Your Sinclair Official Top 100 Games of All Time.

== Legacy ==
The game was followed by Saboteur II: Avenging Angel in 1987.

Several developers worked on a third game (names such as Saboteur 3, Sabot3ur and Saboteur 3D), none of which were ever released.

Unofficial Saboteur games were also created by fans.

The official Saboteur! remake was launched by Clive Townsend in December 2015, and contains an extended map, plot, and gameplay. The game can be played online, and contains the original Spectrum and C64 gameplay and graphics.
