= Durell Software =

Software companies of the United Kingdom

- Type: Private
- Industry: Computer software
- Founded: 1983
- Headquarters: Taunton, Somerset, UK
- Key people: Robert White
- Products: Back-office, client facing insurance software
- Services: Financial services software and insurance aggregation

Durell Software is a software developer based in Taunton, Somerset in the United Kingdom. The company is a provider of back office administration and accounting software to independent financial advisers, mortgage brokers, and general insurance brokers. Durell was formerly a successful video games developer.

== History ==
=== Pre-1987 ===
Durell was founded in 1983 by Robert White. Up to 1987, Durell developed 19 games for various 8-bit computers such as Oric-1, ZX Spectrum, C64, BBC Micro, Acorn Electron and Amstrad CPC. Their biggest hit was Harrier Attack that sold over 250,000 copies, including 100,000 bundled with the Amstrad CPC.

=== Post-1987 ===
Toward the end of 1987 Durell Software sold the rights to publish most of their existing games to Elite Systems and changed focus to developing financial services software for the IFA, insurance and mortgage broking industries. Currently over 1,000 advisers and brokers use Durell's software.

In 2005 Mike Richardson, author of many of Durell's best selling titles for the ZX Spectrum, founded Durell Games Ltd. The first game to be developed by the company was Harrier Attack II, a sequel to their best-selling 8-bit game, which did not repeat its predecessors' success.

== Products ==
Trading under the name Durell Solutions their main products are now:

- Client Facing Services
- Financial Adviser
- General Broker
- Complete Administrator

== Pre-1987 games ==
The following is a list of games developed by Durell before it concentrated on financial services technology in the 90s:

- Galaxy 5 (1983)
- Lunar Lander / Asteroids (1983)
- Starfighter (1983)
- Scuba Dive (1983)
- Harrier Attack (1983)
- Jungle Trouble (1983)
- Lunar Landing (1984)
- Combat Lynx (1984)
- Mineshaft (1984)
- Death Pit (1985) (Note: Death Pit was extensively advertised in 1985 by Durell, but was ultimately not considered good enough for release. An article in issue 25 of Crash remarked: "(A)although halfway through the project there was a moment when it looked like the game might make a commercial release, it didn't come up to scratch." Clive Townsend, who developed the Spectrum version later used some of the routines from this game in the programming of Saboteur. The available development version was recovered in 2007.)
- Critical Mass (1985)
- Saboteur (1985)
- Deep Strike (1986)
- Fat Worm Blows a Sparky (1986)
- Thanatos (1986)
- Turbo Esprit (1986)
- Chain Reaction (1987)
- Saboteur 2 - Avenging Angel (1987)
- Sigma 7 (1987)
- Spitfire (1989)
