= Roland Goes Digging =

1984 video game

- Amsoft cover image
- Developer: Gem Software
- Publisher: Amsoft
- Series: Roland
- Platform: Amstrad CPC
- Release: 1984

Roland Goes Digging (in France, Roland fait des Petits Trous) is a 1984 computer game for the Amstrad CPC series of home computers. It was distributed by Amsoft, on cassette tape for CPC 464 and Amstrad's proprietary 3" disk format, for CPC 664 and CPC 6128 users. The game was developed by regular Amsoft contributors Gem Software and featured Amstrad's CPC mascot Roland, who also appears in other games in the Roland series, such as Roland in the Caves, Roland in Time and Roland in Space.

The game is a clone of Space Panic, with the player guiding Roland along a series of platforms that are reached by ladders, all the while avoiding aliens that prove fatal if he touches them. According to the game's inlay, Roland is employed on a building site that is infested with these aliens and he has been "offered a bonus ... to clear the building of the space squatters". He does this by digging holes in the platforms, into which the aliens will drop, and then dispatching them with his shovel while they are prone. Empty holes are also useful to Roland as a means of accessing lower levels without the use of a ladder.

== Reception ==
Reception

Review scores
Publication	Score
Amstrad Action	54%
Amstrad Computer User	4/5

A review in Amstrad Computer User complimented the game as both "absorbing and addictive". Amstrad Action criticised its lack of originality and variety.
