= Oh Mummy =

1983 video game

- Amstrad CPC box art
- Developer: Gem Software
- Publishers: Gem Software; Amsoft
- Platforms: Amstrad CPC, MSX, ZX Spectrum, Einstein, Camputers Lynx
- Release: EU: 1983
- Genre: Maze
- Mode: Single-player

Oh Mummy is a maze video game for the ZX Spectrum and Camputers Lynx developed and published by Gem Software. The gameplay is similar to that of the 1981 arcade video game Amidar.

== Gameplay ==
The object of the game is to unveil all of the treasure within each level (or pyramid) of the game whilst avoiding the mummies. Each level consists of a two-dimensional board. In contrast with Pac-Man, when the player's character walks around, footprints are left behind. By surrounding an area of the maze with footprints, its content is revealed, which is either a scroll, a mummy, a key, a tomb or nothing at all. In order to complete a level, it is necessary to unveil the key and a tombstone. The scroll enables the player to kill/eat one mummy on the level. If a mummy is unveiled, it follows the player to the next level. The difficulty and speed of the game increases as the player progresses through the levels.

The game is primarily for one player but has a limited multiplayer mode in which players can alternate taking a turn to play each level. Whilst, even at the time, it was considered simple in terms of gameplay, graphics and sound, it was for many people one of the better and more addictive early offerings for the Amstrad.

The music played during gameplay is based on the children's song "The Streets of Cairo", or "The Poor Little Country Maid".

== Ports ==
A version for the Amstrad CPC 464 was published by Amsoft in 1984 and was often included in the free bundles of software that came with the computer. In 1986, Amstrad included the Spectrum version in an introductory software bundle for the ZX Spectrum 128K +2 alongside Crazy Golf, Alien Destroyer, Punchy, Treasure Island, and Disco Dan.
