= Sultan's Maze =

1983 video game

- Developer: Gem Software
- Publisher: Gem Software
- Platforms: Amstrad CPC, Camputers Lynx, Dragon 32/64
- Release: 1983
- Genre: Adventure

Sultan's Maze was first released in the United Kingdom in 1983 by Gem Software and then in 1984 in Spain and the UK by Amsoft. The game was included in the game packs that came with the computer when purchasing an Amstrad CPC 464.

== Gameplay ==
The game starts with the legend that the Sultan was visiting Hampton Court and was robbed of his jewels while in the maze. His bodyguard tried to recover them but was murdered by the group of thieves. In the present day setting of the game, the player must enter the maze and recover the jewels bringing them back outside. Aside from making it through the maze without getting lost or tired the player must also be on the look out for the ghost of the Sultan's bodyguard.
