= Amsoft =

British software company, subsidiary of Amstrad

- Type: Subsidiary
- Industry: software and services for users of Amstrad's range of home computers
- Founded: 1984; 42 years ago
- Defunct: 1989; 37 years ago
- Headquarters: Brentwood House, Brentwood, Essex, United Kingdom
- Key people: Roland Perry, William Poel

Amsoft was a wholly owned subsidiary of Amstrad, PLC, founded in 1984 and re-integrated with its parent company in 1989. Its purpose was to provide an initial infrastructure of software and services for users of Amstrad's range of home computers. Many people's first contact with software on an Amstrad home computer would have been an Amsoft title, as several titles were included in the sales bundles.

== History ==
While developing its first home computer, the Amstrad CPC 464, Amstrad assessed that part of the success of its competitors' machines was the backing of a grown infrastructure of software and services. Being a newcomer to the computer market, Amstrad decided to artificially create this infrastructure for the launch of their own computers. In February 1984, Amstrad founded its Amsoft division headed by Roland Perry and William Poel who at the time were also overseeing the development of the Amstrad CPC 464 itself.

Most prominently, Amsoft acted as the first-party game and business software publisher for Amstrad computers. Most of its software products were licensed from various third-party developers and published under the Amsoft label. This also provided a risk-free means for established software studios to try out their products in the emerging Amstrad CPC market. In addition to publishing software, Amsoft was tasked with press relations and consumer promotion, most notably creating and maintaining the Amstrad User Club and publishing its periodical, the CPC 464 User (later Amstrad Computer User).

When a reliable third-party support had been established, Amsoft gradually faded out the publishing of software and sold the Amstrad User Club as well as the user magazine. By 1989, Amsoft was fully integrated with the main Amstrad corporation and ceased to exist as a separate entity.

== Games ==
Amsoft published many software titles for Amstrad's range of home computers.

=== 1984 ===
- Admiral Graf Spee
- American Football
- Amsgolf
- Animal Vegetable Mineral
- Astro Attack
- Blagger
- Bridge-It
- Les Chiffres Magiques
- Codename MAT
- Detective
- Electro Freddy
- Fruit Machine
- The Galactic Plague
- Le Géographe - France
- Le Géographe - Monde
- Happy Letters
- Harrier Attack
- Haunted Hedges
- Hunchback
- Hunter Killer
- Laserwarp
- Les Lettres Magiques
- Map Rally
- Mr Wong's Loopy Laundry
- Mutant Monty
- Oh Mummy
- Osprey!
- Punchy
- Pyjamarama
- Quack-a-Jack
- Roland Ahoy
- Roland on the Ropes
- Roland in the Caves
- Roland Goes Digging
- Roland Goes Square Bashing
- Roland on the Run
- Snooker
- Spannerman
- Space Hawks
- Star Watcher
- Sultan's Maze
- Timeman One / L'Horloger 1
- L'Horloger 2 / Timeman Two
- Wordhang
- L'Ardoise Magique
- Xanagrams

=== 1985 ===
- 3D Boxing
- 3D Grand Prix
- 3D Stunt Rider
- Alex Higgins World Pool
- Alex Higgins' World Snooker
- Airwolf
- Assault on Port Stanley
- Braxx Bluff
- Campeones
- Classic Racing
- Cyrus 2 Chess
- Doors of Doom
- Dragon's Gold
- Frank 'n' Stein
- Friss Man
- Fu-Kung in Las Vegas
- The Game of Dragons
- Glen Hoddle Soccer
- Happy Numbers
- Jet-Boot Jack
- The Key Factor
- Kingdoms
- Manic Miner
- Masterchess
- Overlord 2
- The Prize
- Rock Hopper
- Roland in Time
- Roland in Space
- Satellite Warrior
- Seesaw
- Sorcery Plus
- Stockmarket
- Strangeloop Plus
- Subterranean Stryker
- Super Pipeline 2
- Supertripper
- Tombstowne
- Traffic
- L'Apprenti Sorcier

=== 1986 ===
- Qabbalah
- Happy Writing
- Nuclear Defence
- Golden Path
- 6128 Games Collection

=== 1987–1989 ===
- Scalextric (1987)
- Tank Command (1988)
- Fantastic Voyage (1989)
