= Roland (franchise) =

- Creators: Alan Sugar; Jose Luis Dominguez

Roland is a video game franchise developed in 1984 by Alan Sugar, CEO of Amstrad, and Jose Luis Dominguez, a Spanish game designer. Named for Roland Perry, a computer engineer who worked for Amstrad, the idea was to have one recognizable character in a number of different computer games in a bid to have the Amstrad CPC compete with the ZX Spectrum and the Commodore 64.

== Games in the Roland-series ==
- 1984: Roland Ahoy! (by Computersmith)
- 1984: Roland on the Ropes (by Indescomp) - a port of the Spanish game Fred for the ZX Spectrum. Roland had to collect bullets, treasures and maps while climbing ropes to get out of a tomb/pyramid. Some villains can be destroyed (skeletons, bats, mummies) while some can only be forced to change direction (ghosts) and some have to be jumped over (dripping poison, rats, scorpions). When the game ends, the end music is the Funeral March. The game was released for the Spectrum and the Commodore as well, and was later remade for the PC.
- 1984: Roland in the Caves (by Indescomp) - a port of the Spanish game Bugaboo (The Flea) for the ZX Spectrum.
- 1984: Roland Goes Digging (by Gem Software for Amsoft) - a Space Panic clone. Roland navigates around a series of platforms and dispatches aliens by digging holes to trap them in.
- 1984: Roland Goes Square Bashing (by Durell) - a logic puzzle game.
- 1984: Roland on the Run (by Epicsoft) - a Frogger clone.
- 1985: Roland in Time (by Gem Software) - a more colourful clone of Manic Miner/Jet Set Willy with some overt homages to Doctor Who.
- 1985: Roland in Space (by Gem Software) - a sequel to Roland In Time and a more colourful clone of the Miner Willy games with homages to Doctor Who.

There was also a type-in game and instructional series, Roland Takes a Running Jump, published in Amstrad's official magazine, Amstrad Computer User, from November 1985 to March 1986.
