= Corvette (disambiguation) =

A corvette is a warship smaller than a frigate.

Corvette may also refer to:

- Aérospatiale Corvette, a business jet
- Chevrolet Corvette, a sports car
- Corellian Corvette, a small ship from Star Wars
- Corvette (bicycle), a model produced from 1954 until 1964
- Corvette (pinball), a 1994 arcade machine
- Corvette (video game), a racing video game
- Corvette 31, a 1966 Canadian sailboat design
- Corvette (computer), a Soviet computer from the 1980s

== See also ==
- Korvettes, American chain of discount department stores
