= Minesweeper Flags =

2009 video game

- Developer(s): TikGames
- Publisher(s): Microsoft
- Series: Minesweeper
- Platform(s): Xbox Live Arcade
- Release: February 11, 2009
- Genre(s): Puzzle video game
- Mode(s): Single-player, multiplayer

Minesweeper Flags is a puzzle video game in the Minesweeper series, developed by TikGames and published by Microsoft. It was released on February 11, 2009 for Xbox Live Arcade, and became unavailable to purchase upon the shutdown of the Xbox 360 storefront in 2024 due to a lack of backward compatibility with newer consoles. It is a 3D version of a Minesweeper variant in which the player can go head-to-head against an opponent. The game received mixed reviews from critics, who described it as adequate for fans of traditional Minesweeper, but unexciting for players expecting a more unique experience.

== Gameplay ==
The normal mode of the game features gameplay similar to traditional Minesweeper, with the player able to click squares on a 3D grid to reveal how many mines are adjacent. The player can mark squares they believe are mines. Clicking too many mines makes them all explode, while successfully clearing the rest of the board will win that level. The multiplayer mode, Flags, makes the player have to race to find the mines before their opponent.

== Reception ==
Taylor Cocke of Official Xbox Magazine rated the game 6.5/10, calling it a good value even if its enjoyment was short-lived. He called its best addition the new campaign mode with irregularly shaped game fields, but noted that its competitive mode was lackluster. Ryan Geddes of IGN rated the game 5.2/10, calling the 3D environments "a strange addition" that "add little of value to the Minesweeper experience". He also described the game's non-fixed camera as "incredibly annoying". He praised the game's multiplayer as "interesting", but disliked the use of a controller to play instead of a computer mouse. X-One Magazine UK gave it an even lower 3/10 score, calling it "better replicated with pen and pad".
