= Mined-Out =

1983 maze video game

- ZX Spectrum cover art
- Developer: Ian Andrew
- Publisher: Quicksilva
- Programmers: ZX Spectrum; Ian Andrew; Oric, Dragon 32; Chris Andrew; BBC Micro, Electron; Ian Rowlings
- Platforms: ZX Spectrum, Dragon 32, BBC Micro, Electron, Oric, Camputers Lynx
- Release: 1983
- Genre: Maze
- Mode: Single-player

Mined-Out is a maze video game created by Ian Andrew originally for the ZX Spectrum home computer in 1983. The objective is to carefully navigate a series of grid-shaped minefields by moving from the bottom to the top of the screen. The number of invisible mines in spaces adjacent to the player's current position is shown but not their precise location, requiring deduction to advance past them and avoid getting blown up. Additional challenges are introduced in later stages.

Andrew was an early adopter of the ZX81 and Spectrum. He learned to program in BASIC in his spare time and used the Spectrum's colour limitations in designing Mined-Out as his first commercial product. He sent a copy to Quicksilva after the company advertised a request for new titles to publish. The game was promptly ported to other computers including the Dragon 32, Camputers Lynx, Oric, BBC Micro, and Acorn Electron.

Mined-Out was a financial success, allowing Andrew to establish his own development studio, Incentive Software. The game was also critically well received by British computer publications. The simple yet novel use of logic in its gameplay was generally praised while opinions on its presentation varied slightly between versions. Although Mined-Out was not the first Minesweeper-style game, it preceded the popular Microsoft Minesweeper by several years and likely influenced it.

== Gameplay ==
The player is chased by "The Bug" near the exit of the fourth maze. Visible mines uncovered by a "Mine Spreader" dot the screen while a detector showing any mines adjacent to the player is shown at the top.

Mined-Out is a maze video game requiring the player to complete a series of nine levels to rescue Bill the Worm, a famous movie star being held captive in the game's final area. Each maze is a grid-shaped minefield that must be carefully traversed from the bottom to the top of the screen by moving up, down, left, or right. A detector displays the number of invisible mines in spaces possibly above, below, or beside (but not diagonal to) the player's current position. This requires one to deduce the correct path as stepping on a mine results in instant death. The player also has a "speed score" whereby more points are awarded the faster a stage is completed. An instant replay of the player's attempt is shown after dying or completing a stage.

Later stages add more challenges. Female worms called "Damsels" can be rescued for bonus points starting on the second level. The third level introduces a "Mine Spreader" that relocates mines on a horizontal portion of the map and make them visible. While the game has no time limit, a mobile mine called "The Bug" begins stalking the player through their path starting on the fourth level, pressuring them to advance towards the goal. Lastly, the player's revealed path will disappear behind them beginning on the sixth level. Any previously completed maze can be attempted again.

== Development and release ==
Mined-Out was written and programmed by Ian Andrew. He ran a postage stamp and postcard business in Reading and was among the first individuals to purchase a Sinclair ZX81 after seeing it advertised in the Daily Mail. He taught himself to program in BASIC with the machine and then bought a ZX Spectrum when it launched in 1982, leisurely creating games for his own amusement. Mined-Out would be his first commercial product.

It took Andrew three months to program and six months to complete all work on Mined-Out. He stated that the game's concept was a result of the Spectrum's colour limitations, as each "character square" (consisting of eight by eight pixels) could have only two colours, making the system ideal for games using grids. Simply moving through such squares did not qualify as a game to Andrew, so he made some of them invisible and gave the player clues to avoid them, leading to its mine detection gameplay. Mined-Out was originally designed as a single level that became faster the longer it was played. Andrew's mother playtested and quickly mastered this format, so he broke the game up into levels of increasing difficulty to deliberately set it apart from many of its contemporaries. Since the game would be available to a wide audience, more features were added to subsequent stages to "keep it interesting for as long as possible."

Andrew sent the finished product to Quicksilva after the company advertised a request for new games to publish. Mined-Out was first released for the Spectrum in early 1983. A commercial game written in BASIC was unusual as most others were machine coded. Ports were developed and subsequently released for other home computers including Dragon 32, BBC Micro, Acorn Electron, Camputers Lynx and Oric. Ian Andrew's brother Chris programmed the Dragon 32 and Oric versions while Ian Rowlings programmed the Micro and Electron versions. Mined-Out was a financial success for Andrew, allowing him to sell his postcard business and devote his career to publishing video games with his newly established company Incentive Software starting in late 1983.

== Reception ==
Mined-Out was well received by British computer publications upon its release. Critics largely agreed that the mine-detection gameplay offered a simple yet novel addition to the maze genre. Mike Gerrard of Personal Computer News, Chris Adam-Smith of ZX Computing, and reviewers for Games Computing and Home Computing Weekly all positively noted this feature as addictive in its various releases. Assessing the ZX Spectrum version, Gerrard summarized, "Can you praise any game higher than by saying it's one of those where you decide you'll have just one more go, then find yourself still playing half an hour later?" Acorn User reviewer Vincent Fojut called the BBC Micro version "a refreshing change from the usual 'blast 'em out of the sky' derivatives." Crash recommended the game in its 1984 catalog of Spectrum reviews by stating "it hasn't dated a bit" and it that it was "still worth the money if you haven't tried it." Stuart Campbell of Your Sinclair listed the game as the 97th best Spectrum game of all time in 1991, citing its core logic gameplay as "one of the greatest mind-teasers ever devised." Vic Fielder of Popular Computing Weekly oppositely found the game to lack replay value.

Opinions on the game's presentation were somewhat mixed. Computer and Video Games, which listed the Dragon 32 version among their Hall of Fame Games in early 1984, called it "slickly presented" and that the music and sound effects would suitably accompany the player's actions. Gerrard judged the graphics as "effective" and the sound effects "as good as you can expect from the Spectrum, if that's not an insult." Games Computing concluded that the "graphics are satisfactory and the sound is minimal, but neither stetches the Oric to its considerable limits." One contributor for Home Computing Weekly noted that the "graphics are simple, colourful, and perfectly adequate" for the Spectrum version. While another writer for the same publication positively noted that "colour and sound are used dramatically" to keep one's interest in the Dragon 32 version, they were disappointed by its low-resolution graphics and a "great disparity between the packaging and the visual product." Fojut complained about the mandatory loading of the demonstration and instructions before each play session.

== Legacy ==
Mined-Out was an early Minesweeper-style game and preceded the popular 1990 Windows inclusion Microsoft Minesweeper by several years. The two share important similarities such as a grid layout and a display showing the number of adjacent mines. Eurogamer writer Dan Griliopoulos labeled Mined-Out as an inspiration for Minesweeper and even received commentary from Mined-Out creator Ian Andrew in 2014 that he believes Microsoft copied his game. In an interview that same year with Graeme Mason of Retro Gamer, Andrew humorously admitted he would have liked a credit from Microsoft. Griliopoulos was told by Microsoft programmer Curt Johnson that an unnamed Macintosh clone of Mined-Out was instead used as the base for Microsoft Minesweeper.

Will Freeman of PCGamesN and Cracked.com contributors Adam Wears and Jim Avery pointed to Cube, submitted to Creative Computing in 1973 by Jerimac Ratliff, as the original forebear of the genre. Freeman also saw Minefield from a 1982 issue of Sinclair User as another earlier example, but credited Mined-Out for refining the notion of displaying mine proximities. Wears and Avery remarked that despite having less features, Microsoft's game earned fame and ubiquity thanks to being on the popular Windows operating system. Mason also talked with Damien Moore, creator of the Authoritative Minesweeper website and world rankings, who drew a direct link between Relentless Logic and Microsoft's game but felt that Mined-Out was an influence.
