= Xanagrams =

1984 video game

- Developer: Dean Software
- Publishers: Amsoft, Postern Ltd
- Platforms: Acorn Electron, Amstrad CPC, BBC Micro, Commodore 64, Sharp MZ, ZX Spectrum
- Release: 1983, 1984
- Genres: Educational, Puzzle, Word game
- Mode: Single-player

Xanagrams is an educational game that is a cross between a crossword puzzle and Scrabble released between 1983 and 1984 for the Acorn Electron, Amstrad CPC, BBC Micro, Commodore 64, Sharp MZ and ZX Spectrum. It was given away for free with the Amstrad CPC 464 and was a popular game. There are 3 difficulty level to the game, from middle school aged to adults. A game can consist of 1-5 words and the player is given a jumble of letters to sort out to form the correct words.
