= Scalextric (video game) =

1987 video game

- Publisher: Leisure Genius
- Platforms: Amstrad CPC, Commodore 64, ZX Spectrum
- Release: 1987
- Genre: Racing
- Modes: Single-player, multiplayer

Scalextric is a 1987 racing video game developed by Leisure Genius, based on the Scalextric slot car racing toys.

== Gameplay ==
Scalextric has horizontal split-screen and features seventeen circuits to race on.

== Development ==
Scalextric was published by Leisure Genius.

== Reception ==
Reception

Review scores
Publication	Score
Crash	57%
Computer and Video Games	27/40
Sinclair User	4/5
Your Sinclair	8/10
Zzap!64	78%
Computer Gamer	54%

Scalextric received mixed to positive reviews from video game critics.
