= Corvette (computer) =

Series of personal home computers

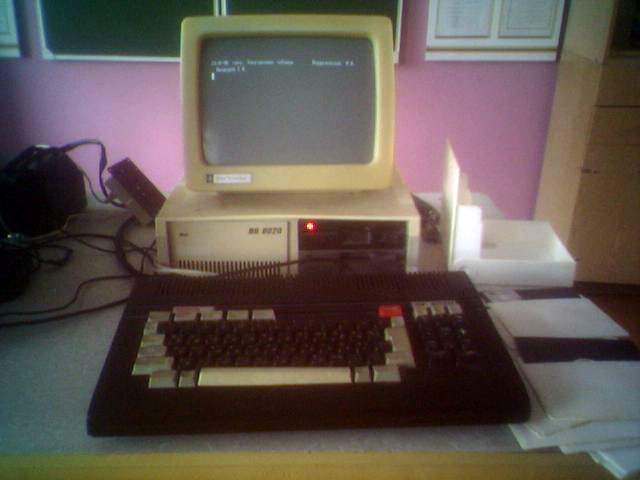
- Developer: Moscow State University
- Type: Personal computer
- Generation: 8-bit
- Released: 1987
- Lifespan: 1985–1992
- Operating system: CP/M, MicroDOS
- CPU: KR580VM80A, 2,5 MHz
- Memory: 64 KB CPU RAM, 48 or 192 KB Video RAM, 1 KB Text RAM, 24 Kb ROM
- Storage: floppy disk drive 5¼, Cassette tape
- Display: 512 × 256 resolution graphics, 32 × 16 or 64 × 16 character text, 16 colors on screen
- Sound: Intel 8253

Corvette (Russian: Корвет) was an 8-bit personal computer in the USSR, created specifically for Education in the Soviet Union in the 1980s. The initial prototype of this computer emerged in 1985 as a project by Moscow State University employees, primarily for conducting physics experiments. It was originally a homemade computer. The first description, including the documentation detailing its specifications, was made in the magazine «Microprocessor tools and systems». The PC was named PK 8001 (Russian: ПК 8001 (21 August 1985)).

== Graphics ==
This computer had advanced graphics capabilities for its time, featuring a single video mode using four planes: three for graphics and one for text.

The graphic planes sport a resolution of 512 × 256, while the text plane can display either 32 × 16 or 64 × 16 text using two sets of 256 ROM 8 × 16 characters for both modes. It is capable of showing 16 colors on screen, with 8 freely selectable colors and an additional 8 colors achievable by combining text symbols and pixels. Any logical color can correspond to any of the 0 to 15 RGBI hardware palette colors.

The graphic video RAM size is 192 KB (4 pages) or 48 KB (1 page), while the text video RAM size is 1 KB, using 9-bit static RAM. The 9th bit serves as the reverse video attribute, and there is no contention for access to video and processor RAM.

The Corvette incorporates a method to accelerate filling an area with a specific color, potentially outpacing the performance of an IBM PC AT with an EGA card in this particular task.

== Sound ==
One channel of the Intel 8253 programmable IC is used to generate sound.

== Software ==
- BASIC interpreter in ROM, fully compliant with the MSX standard, including all graphic commands (drawing points, lines, rectangles, filled rectangles, circles, ellipses, arcs, closed area filling, DRAW), working with integers, etc.
- Operation systems MicroDOS (МикроДОС) and CP/M-80 (with floppy disk driver)
- Text editor «Супертекст», «Микромир» (MIM), etc.
- DBMS dBase II
- Spreadsheet Microsoft Multiplan
- Compilers for Fortran, Pascal, C, Ada, Forth, Lisp, PL/M, etc.
- Software for education
- Games («Berkut», PopCorn, Stalker, Dan Dare, Continental Circus, Deflector, «Treasure», «Winnie the Pooh», «Treasure Island», Super Tetris, Karate, etc.)

== Educational computer technology complex ==
"НИИСчётмаш" created an educational computer technology complex based on "Corvette". It includes a teacher's computer (ПК8020, with FDD, a printer port) and about 15 computers for students (ПК8010), connected to the local network (19,5 kbit/s).

== Variants ==
The Corvette has been mass-produced since 1987 at the plants of the Ministry of Radio Technology:

| Place | Name | Description |
|---|---|---|
| Baku Production Association "Radio Engineering" | PC 8010/8020 «Corvette» | The original scheme without modifications. Original firmware ROM ОПТС 1.1 or ОПТС 2.0. Original firmware of the character generator.. |
| Brest Electromechanical Plant | PC 8010/8020 «Corvette» | The original scheme without modifications. Original firmware ROM ОПТС 1.1 or ОПТС 2.0. Original firmware of the character generator.. |
| Moscow Experimental and Computing Center ELEKS | PC «Eleks-1» | ? |
| Cooperative ELIN | ? | ? |
| Frunze Factory "Computer" (Kyrgyz SSR) | ? | ? |
| Izhevsk Radio Plant | PC «Kontur» | Modification of the "Corvette" with a simplified scheme and a modified keyboard. Modified firmware ROM ОПТС 2.0. Modified firmware of the character generator. |
| October (production association) | PC «Neiva» | The original scheme without modifications. Original firmware ROM ОПТС 2.0. Original firmware of the character generator.. |
| Leningrad LNPO "Electroautomatics" | PC 8015 «Orbit» | Following the previously mastered game device "Intellect", a modification of "Corvette" – PC 8015 "Orbit" was produced. Minor modification of the circuit. Original firmware ROM ОПТС 2.0. Original firmware of the character generator. |
| Nizhny Novgorod Research Institute of Measuring Systems | PC «Quantum-8» | Modification of the "Corvette" with a greatly modified circuit, keyboard and body. Modified firmware ROM ОПТС 1.1 or ОПТС 3.0. Modified firmware of the character generator. |
| Nizhny Novgorod Research Institute of Measuring Systems | telegraph device "Telecommunication terminal VK-8T" | Modification of "Quantum-8", which was a telegraph terminal with the function "creeping line" and with a non-standard keyboard for Corvette. Modified firmware ROM ОПТС 3.0. Modified firmware of the character generator. |
| Factory "Sail" (Sevastopol) | ? | A small production of training classes has been established |

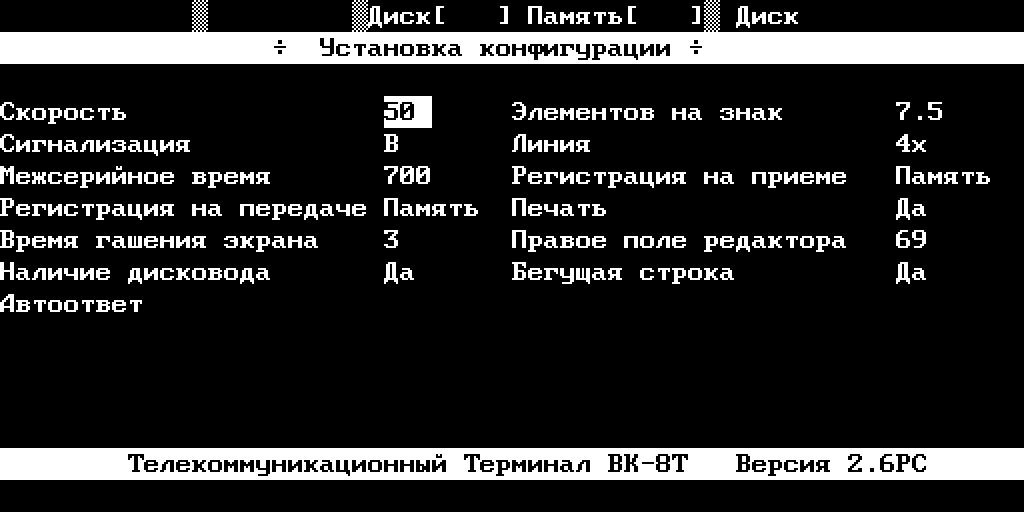
Screenshot of the VK-8T Telecommunication Terminal (Corvette modification – Kvanta-8)

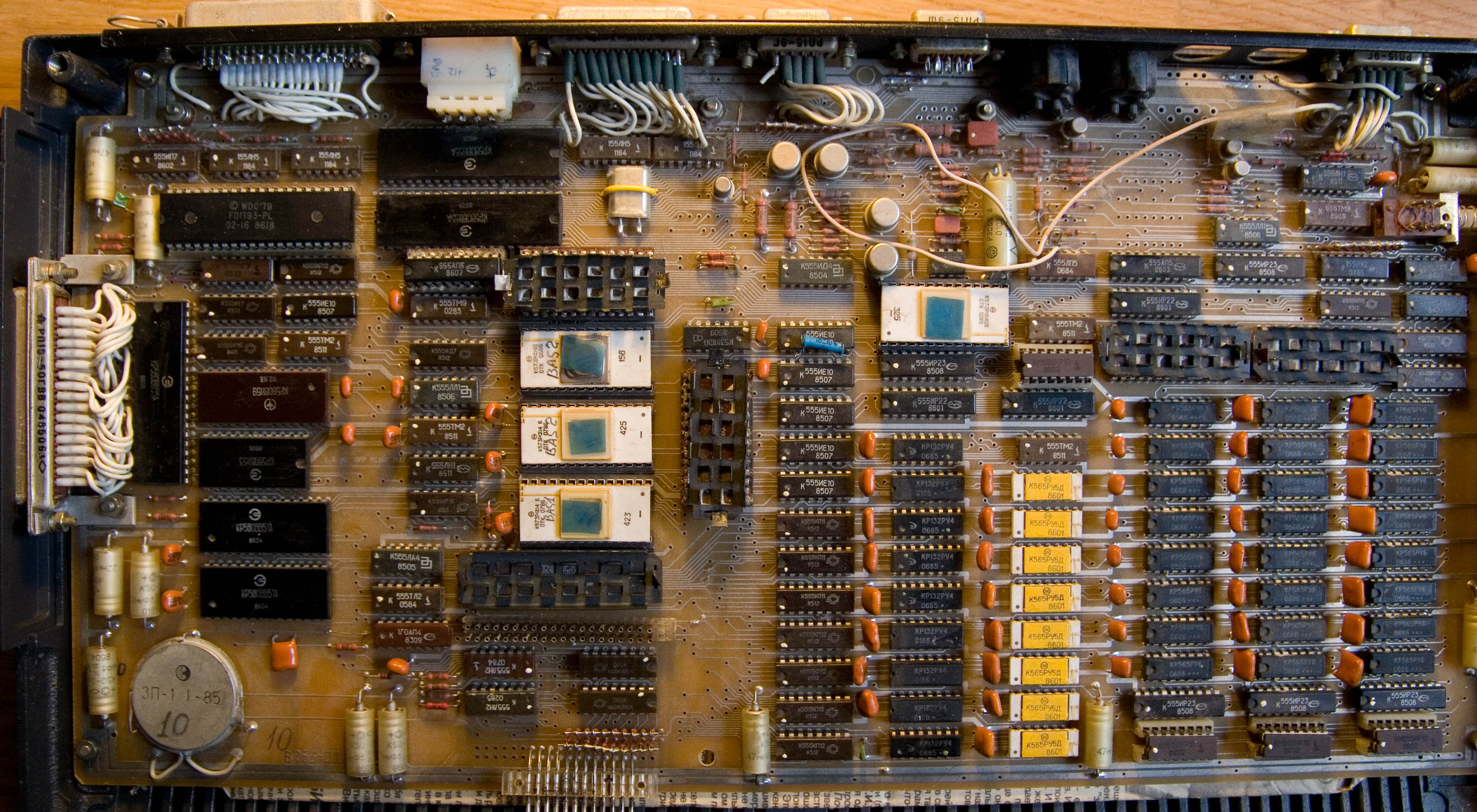
Corvette main logic board (1986)

== Production ==
Even though the Corvette was created in a fairly short time and the decision to produce a new computer was approved by the Council of Ministers, the start of mass production was delayed.

Even though the computer comprised components already well within the capabilities of Soviet industry, timely scaling of production proved challenging due to the subpar quality of the supplied components. Compounding matters was the rivalry with another computer of similar purpose, the UKNC.

As a result, the delivery of the new computer significantly lagged behind the projected timeline.

Corvette production
| Year | Plan | Fact |
|---|---|---|
| 1987 | 10000 | 1157 |
| 1988 | 36000 | ? |
| 1989 | 84000 | 36900 |
| 1990 | 120000 | ? |
| 1992 | 250000 | ? |

After the collapse of the USSR, Corvette production stopped, and incomplete cases were used to assemble numerous ZX Spectrum clones.

"LINTech" (Laboratory of Information Technologies) carried out a modernization of the Corvette for use in schools, by recommendation of the Ministry of Education. The network was modernized, with speed increased from 19.5 to 375 kb/s and an IBM PC-compatible computer was installed as the head machine

== Links ==
- Forum about educational computer technology complex «Corvette»
- Emulator «Corvette» S. Erohin (Linux)
- Emulator b2m, it can emulate the Corvette (Microsoft Windows)
- Emulator emu80, it can emulate the Corvette (Linux, Microsoft Windows, MacOS)
- Emulator «Corvette» in the OS Android
- About «Corvette»
- «Corvette» documentation
- «Corvette» description in the wiki Emuverse
- «Corvette» characteristics
- Technical documents
- Scheme and description
- «Corvette» ПК8010 / ПК8020 and MSX2: additional tests («Corvette» PC8020 & MSX2)
- PAINT: Korvet VS UKNC
- Games and other programs for «Corvette»
