= Treasure Island (1984 video game) =

1980's computer game

- Plus/4 title screen
- Publisher: Mr. Micro
- Platforms: ZX Spectrum, Commodore 64, Plus/4, C16
- Release: 1984
- Genre: Action-adventure
- Mode: Single-player

Treasure Island is a 1984 computer game based on the 1883 novel Treasure Island by Robert Louis Stevenson. In the game, the player takes on the role of the book's protagonist Jim Hawkins and has to battle through hordes of pirates before a final showdown with Long John Silver. The game uses a flip-screen style.

The programming was done by Greg Duddle, and the music was rendered by David Whittaker. The version for the Commodore 64 and ZX Spectrum was released in 1984, and the Plus/4 version was from 1985. The latter version is bug free and has minor differences. On the Commodore 64 and ZX Spectrum it is impossible to get the maximum score because of bugs. The Commodore Plus/4 version was also converted for the Corvette in 1989.

== Gameplay and premise ==
Commodore Plus/4 screenshot

Players control Treasure Island protagonist Jim Hawkins, using various tools to get through the levels with a limited number of supplies. Enemy pirates act as obstacles for progress and throw cutlasses when Jim is in range, which can be taken and used by players to defeat enemies. On the Plus/4 or Corvette it is possible to get 101% final score.

== Legacy ==
Having changed the theme from pirates to Asia, the same game was re-released as The Willow Pattern Adventure for the Commodore 64, Amstrad CPC, and ZX Spectrum.

== See also ==
Another adventure game named Treasure Island was published by Windham Classics in the year 1985.
