= Minesweeper (video game) =

Puzzle video game genre

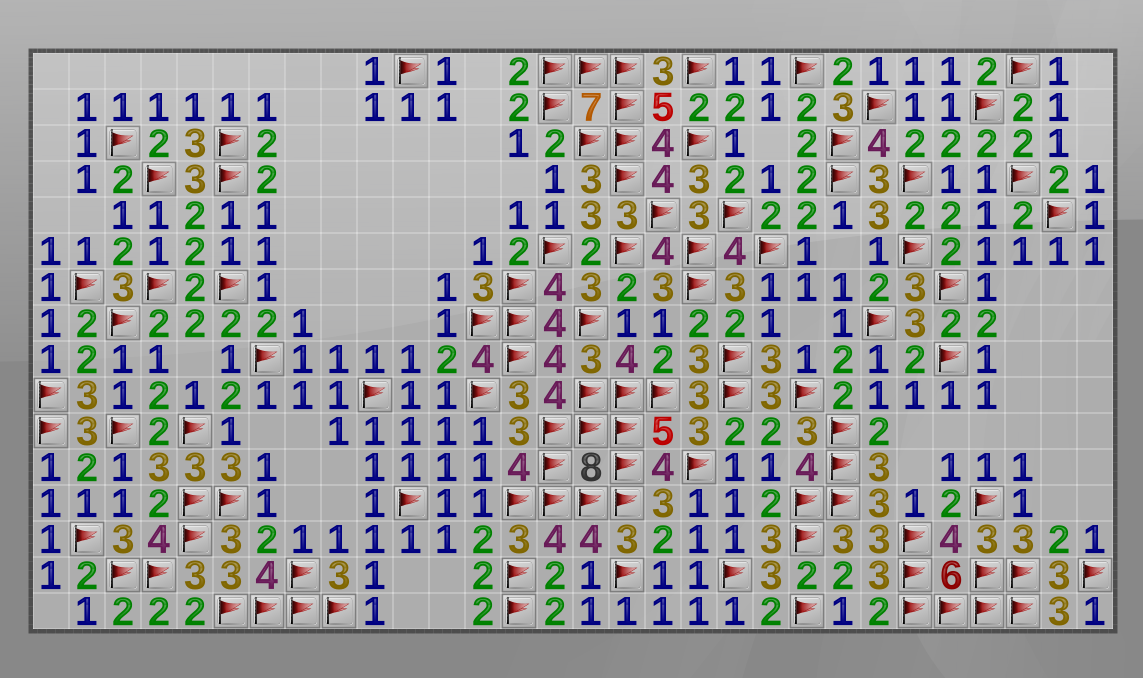
A completed expert game of KMines, a free and open-source variant of Minesweeper

Minesweeper is a logic puzzle video game genre generally played on personal computers. The game features a grid of clickable tiles, with hidden "mines" (depicted as naval mines in the original game) dispersed throughout the board. The objective is to clear the board without detonating any mines, using clues about the number of neighboring mines in each field.

The origin of Minesweeper is unclear. According to TechRadar, the first version of the game was 1990's Microsoft Minesweeper, but Eurogamer states Mined-Out (1983) by Ian Andrew was the first Minesweeper game. Curt Johnson, the creator of Microsoft Minesweeper, acknowledges that his game's design was borrowed from another game, but denies that it was Mined-Out.

Variants of Minesweeper have been made that expand on the basic concepts, such as Minesweeper X, Crossmines, Minesweeper Plus, and Minehunt. Minesweeper has been incorporated as a minigame in other games, such as RuneScape and Minecraft's 2015 April Fools update.

== Gameplay ==
Minesweeper is a puzzle video game. In the game, mines (that resemble naval mines in the classic theme) are scattered throughout a board, which is divided into cells. Cells have three states: unopened, opened, and flagged. An unopened cell is blank and clickable, while an opened cell is exposed. Flagged cells are those marked by the player to indicate a potential mine location.

A player selects a cell to open it, typically using left click on a mouse. If a player opens a cell containing a mine, the game ends. Otherwise, the opened cell displays either a number, indicating the number of mines vertically, horizontally or diagonally adjacent to it, or a blank tile (or "0"), and all adjacent non-mined cells will automatically be opened. Players can also flag a cell, usually with a right mouse click, to denote that they believe a mine to be in that place. In some versions of the game when the number of adjacent mines is equal to the number of adjacent flagged cells, all adjacent non-flagged unopened cells will be opened when left and right mouse buttons are pressed simultaneously, a process known as chording.

=== Objective and strategy ===
A game of Minesweeper begins when the player first selects a cell on a board. In some variants the first click is guaranteed to be safe, and some further guarantee that all adjacent cells are safe as well. During the game, the player uses information given from the opened cells to deduce further cells that are safe to open, iteratively gaining more information to solve the board. The player is also given the number of remaining mines in the board, known as the minecount, which is calculated as the total number of mines subtracted by the number of flagged cells (thus the minecount can be negative if too many flags have been placed).

To win a game of Minesweeper, all non-mine cells must be opened without opening a mine. There is no score, but there is a timer recording the time taken to finish the game. Difficulty can be increased by adding mines or starting with a larger grid. Most variants of Minesweeper that are not played on a fixed board offer three default board configurations, usually known as Beginner, Intermediate, and Expert, in order of increasing difficulty. Beginner is usually on an 8×8 or 9×9 board containing 10 mines, Intermediate is usually on a 16×16 board with 40 mines and Expert is usually on a 30×16 board with 99 mines; however, there is usually an option to customise board size and mine count.

An example beginner (9×9) difficulty Minesweeper game from start to solved state

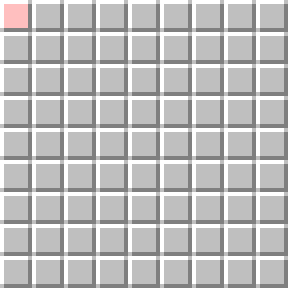

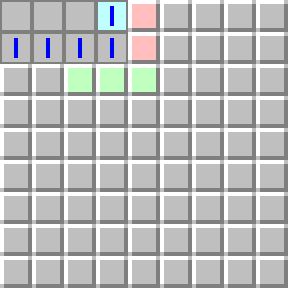

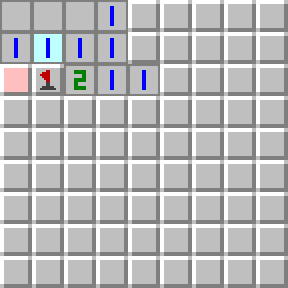

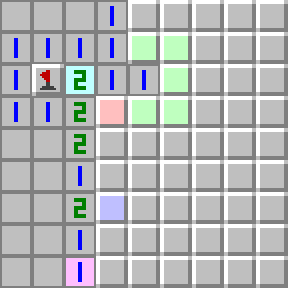

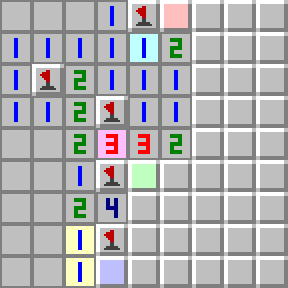

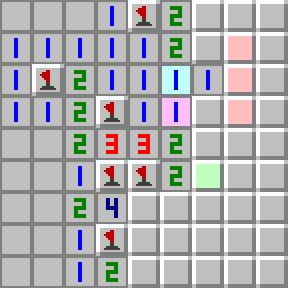

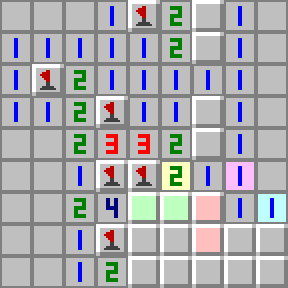

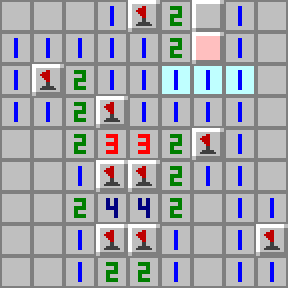

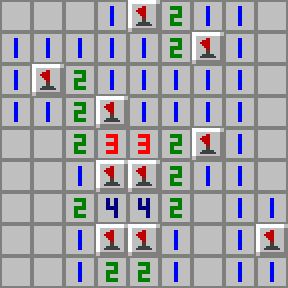

== History ==
According to TechRadar, Minesweeper was created by Microsoft in the 1990s, but Eurogamer commented that Minesweeper gained a lot of inspiration from a "lesser known, tightly designed game", Mined-Out by Ian Andrew for the ZX Spectrum in 1983. According to Andrew, Microsoft copied Mined-Out for Microsoft Minesweeper. The Microsoft version made its first appearance in 1990, in Windows Entertainment Pack, which was given as part of Windows 3.11. The game was written by Robert Donner and Curt Johnson. Johnson stated that Microsoft Minesweeper's design was borrowed from another game, but denies it was Mined-Out. In 2001, a group called the International Campaign to Ban Winmine campaigned for the game's topic to be changed from landmines. The group commented that the game "is an offence against the victims of the mines". A later version, found present in Windows Vista's Minesweeper, offered a tileset with flowers replacing mines as a response.

Another early version is the SunOS (Unix) video game Mines, released in 1987 and written by Tom Anderson. According to minesweeper.com, it was ported to XWindows in 1990.

The game is frequently bundled with operating systems and desktop environments, including Minesweeper for IBM's OS/2, Microsoft Windows, KDE, GNOME and Palm OS. Microsoft Minesweeper was included by default in Windows until Windows 8 (2012). Microsoft replaced this with a free-to-play version of the game, downloadable from the Microsoft Store.

== Variants ==
Variants of Minesweeper have been made that expand on the basic concepts and add new game design elements. Minesweeper X is a clone of the Microsoft version with improved randomization and more statistics, and is popular with players of the game intending to reach a fast time. Arbiter and Viennasweeper are also clones, and are used similarly to Minesweeper X. Crossmines is a more complex version of the game's base idea, adding linked mines and irregular blocks. BeTrapped transposes the game into a mystery game setting. There are several direct clones of Microsoft Minesweeper available online.

Minesweeper Q was released in 2011 by the independent developer Spica, and is another clone of the Microsoft version available as a mobile and tablet app for iOS users. It includes quick flagging and quick open mode. Users also have the option to change their board appearance from the classic gray/mines to flowers or clouds. Because this version is limited to use on mobile and iPad, it may not be ideal for players aiming to reach a fast time.

Minesweeper was made part of RuneScape through a minigame called Vinesweeper. The non-Japanese releases of Pokémon HeartGold and SoulSilver contained a variation of both Minesweeper and nonograms. The video game Minecraft released a version of Minesweeper in its 2015 April Fools' Day update called Minescreeper. The HP-48G graphing calculator includes a variant called "Minehunt", where the player has to move safely from one corner of the playfield to the other. The only clues given are how many mines are in the squares surrounding the player's current position. Google Search includes a version of Minesweeper, available by searching the game's name. A logic puzzle variant of Minesweeper, suitable for playing on paper, starts with some squares already revealed. The player cannot reveal any more squares, but must instead mark the remaining mines correctly. Unlike the usual form of Minesweeper, these puzzles usually have a unique solution. These puzzles appeared under the name "tentaizu" (天体図), Japanese for a star map, in Southwest Airlines' magazine Spirit in 2008–2009.

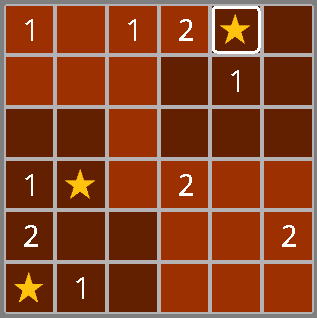
A tentaizu puzzle

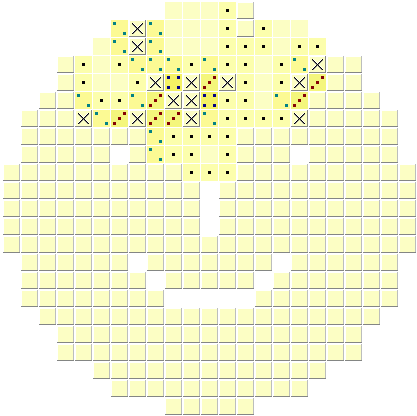
Online, non-rectangular

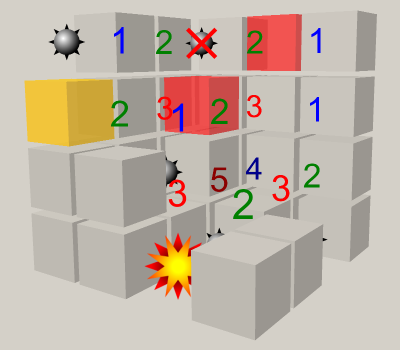
3D

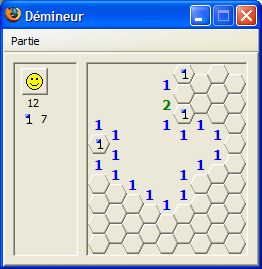
Hexagonal

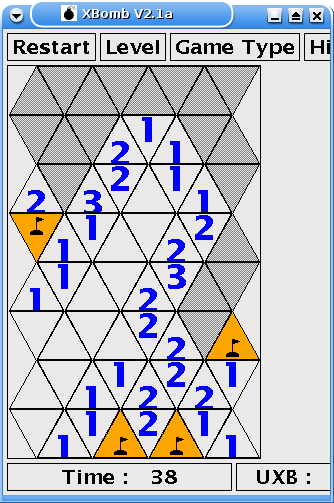
Triangular

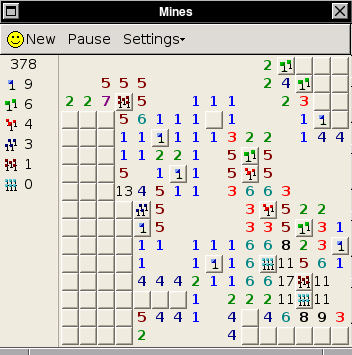
Multiple mines in cells

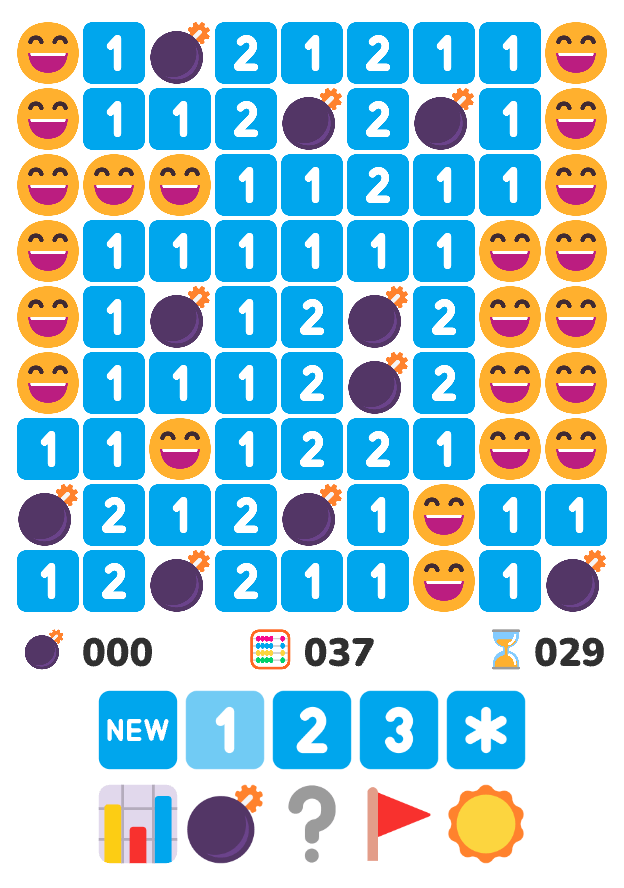
Emoji minesweeper

== Competitive play ==
Competitive Minesweeper players aim to complete the game as fast as possible. The players memorize patterns to reduce times. Some players use a technique called the "1.5 click" where the right click is held after placing a flag, the left click is pressed when the cursor is over a number, and both mouse buttons are released to chord. Other players do not flag mines at all. The game is played competitively in tournaments, including the 2025 Minesweeper World Championship in Madrid, Spain. A community of dedicated players has emerged; this community was centralized on websites such as Minesweeper.info. As of 2015, according to Guinness World Records, the fastest time to complete all three difficulties of Minesweeper is 38.65 seconds by Kamil Murański in 2014. As of 2026, the official rankings list the fastest time to complete all three difficulties of Minesweeper as 32.88 seconds by Ze-En Ju.

== Computational complexity ==
In 2000, Sadie Kaye published a proof that Minesweeper is NP-complete to determine whether a given grid of uncovered, correctly flagged, and unknown squares, the labels of the foremost also given, has an arrangement of mines for which it is possible within the rules of the game. The argument is constructive, a method to quickly convert any Boolean circuit into such a grid that is possible if and only if the circuit is satisfiable; membership in NP is established by using the arrangement of mines as a certificate. If, however, a minesweeper board is already guaranteed to be consistent, solving it is not known to be NP-complete, but it has been proven to be co-NP-complete. In the latter case, however, minesweeper exhibits a phase transition analogous to k-SAT: when more than 25% of squares are mines, solving a board requires guessing an exponentially-unlikely set of mines. Kaye also proved that infinite Minesweeper is Turing-complete.

== See also ==
- Board puzzles with algebra of binary variables
- 1990s in video games
