= Amstrad Computer User =

Official magazine for the Amstrad CPC series of home computers

- Amstrad Computer User #28, March 1987
- Editor: Gareth Jefferson (Aug/Sep '84); William Poel (Oct/Nov '84); Simon Rockman (Jan/Feb '84-Mar '89); Mark Evans (Apr '89); Duncan Evans (May '89-Jun '89); Carlo Jolly (Jul '89-Sep '89); Guy Matthews (Oct '89-May '90); Chris Knight (Jun '90-May '92)
- Categories: Video game journalism
- Frequency: Monthly
- Circulation: 63,599 (Jan to Jun 1987)
- First issue: August/September 1984
- Final issue Number: May 1992; 90
- Company: Amsoft; Avralite Ltd; Focus Magazines Ltd; MSM Ltd/MCPC Ltd; HHL Publishing
- Country: United Kingdom
- Language: English
- ISSN: 0952-3049

Amstrad Computer User was the official magazine for the Amstrad CPC series of 8-bit home computers. This monthly publication, usually referred to as ACU by its readers, concentrated more on the hardware and technical side of the Amstrad range, although it had a small dedicated games section as well.

== ACU History ==
ACU ran from August 1984 to May 1992, producing 90 issues in total. Originally a bi-monthly Amstrad User's club newsletter titled CPC 464 User, it was renamed to Amstrad Computer User when the CPC 664 was released in 1985. Its successor was CPC Attack, which was launched in June 1992.

=== August 1984 to April 1985 ===
Amstrad Computer User started out as CPC 464 User (subtitled ‘The Official Amstrad Micro Magazine’) and the first issue was dated August September 1984 and was 32 pages long. Published by Amsoft, a division of Amstrad, the first couple of issues were not made available to the general public, but only to members of the Amstrad User Club. CPC 464 User’s only editorial credit in the launch issue was Consultant Editor Gareth Jefferson. Content in these early months included News, Overview (an in-depth look at the CPC 464), Q&A, Software Reviews, Listings, Programming and more. Early games featured included Roland in the Caves and Roland on the Ropes.

The Jan/Feb 1985 issue 3, with slightly renamed title, Amstrad CPC 464 User, was the first issue to go on sale to the general public costing 95p and 84 pages long. Simon Rockman is credited as editor along with other contributors.

From issue 4 onwards Amstrad CPC 464 User went monthly. Sorcery, from Virgin Games, is the first game to receive 5 stars in all ratings, Graphics, Playability, Addictiveness and Overall.

=== ACU - June 1985 to January 1986 ===
May 1985's issue 6 features the newly released Amstrad CPC 664 (basically a CPC 464 with a disk drive instead of a cassette deck) on the cover and in depth analysis and features inside.

Following the release of the CPC 664, the June issue is the first to display the renamed title; the familiar Amstrad Computer User. The Gallup software chart is published for the first time. Topping the top 20 chart is Virgin’s Sorcery. Anne Coker joins the magazine as assistant editor.

A slight re-design for July’s issue 8. Credits list includes editorial and, for the first time, Production, Design and Advertising staff. Contents still include the regular Programming, Hardware and Software features.

October 1985's issue 10 looks at the new Amstrad CPC 6128; a new computer with a disk drive plus 128k of memory.

December 1985’s issue 12, and ACU’s 1st birthday, a bumper 148 page issue, featuring a re-design of the games reviews, again; which has a new ratings box that has marks out of 20 for Graphics, Sound, polish, First impression, lasting impression, value and a final comment.

=== A Year of Changes – February to December 1986 ===
William Poel, General Manager of Amsoft and Managing Director of ACU, announced that he will be leaving to run a software company called New Star. A new Adventure feature ‘Seek and Ye Shall Find’ starts in the February issue

March 1986 and another re-design; clearer layout and main content sections include Regulars, Features, Listings, Reviews and ABC (Amstrad Business Computing). The long running column ‘Hairy Hacker’ debuts this issue; a feature that looks into getting the most out of the CPC including game pokes. Also a 5p rise in the cover price; now up to £1.00.

June 1986, issue 19, introduces new Deputy Editor Jeremy Spencer. Also reviews are given a much needed rework; three reviewers, Colin, Nigel and Liz, are credited as giving their views on the games along with their overall score (out of 20).

Starting October 1986, and ACU credits its publisher as Avralite Ltd.

November 1986 issue seems to be a letters page for professional programmers as Graham Blighe, Andrew and Philip Oliver write in to comment on recent ACU games reviews.

=== ACU Settles Down – January 1987 to December 1988 ===
A year of continuous fluidity. During 1987 several games are given special 2/3 page feature reviews, including the innovative strategy game The Sentinel, Ranarama, Gryzor and Nigel Mansell’s Grand Prix.

The November 87 issue publishes the ACU circulation figures for Jan-Jun 1987; an impressive 63,599. This figure would turn out to be the only ABC figure that would be published.

ACU's January 1988 and another redesign of the magazine layout. The cover logo has also changed along with the general look of the magazine; more colour and neater design. The regular features remain the same for the time being.

Auntie John is the character behind a new programming feature ‘Auntie John’s Machine Code’ which starts in June 1988’s issue.

A special cover feature on David Perry and his CPC game Savage features in the November 1988 issue.

=== Incorporation – January 1989 to February 1990 ===
January 1989 and ACU incorporates CPC Computing and the magazine goes through a redesign. The games pages get a new look with the introduction of the 'ACU Star Game' awards; 'ACU Gold Star Game' and the 'ACU Silver Star Game'.

Focus Magazines Ltd takes over the publishing of the magazine from March 1989. All change for the April issue as ACU has moved to a new publisher and new office. Mark Evans and Andrew Banner are the new editor and assistant editor respectively. Many new reviewers are credited on the games pages, including Matt, Adrian, Colin, Paul, Billy, Tony and Rik.

May 1989 - As quick as the new editorial staff arrived the quicker they left. New Editor and staff writer are Duncan Evans and Richard Henderson. Another redesign sees a new 'Neon Zone' section where the latest arcade games are featured. The games section is changed again; going under the 'Meltdown' title the games are rated by percentages; Grafix, Sonix, Gameplay and Overall.

June 1989's issue reviews Emlyn Hughes International Soccer, by Audiogenic, and it becomes the first game to gain over 90% overall rating with a 91%.

July 1989 and a completely redesigned magazine with a new front cover logo. New credits mast (including new Editor Carlo Jolly, Sub Editor Harold Mayes, Designer Simon Pipe and contributor Mark Ulyatt. Even contributors have been credited for the first time. The Arcade feature is renamed 'Combat Zone'. 'Gameplan' is the new name for the games section and games are rated by using a bar indicator. The higher the indicator went along the bar the better the rating. Published, again, by Avralite Publications Ltd.

More changes happened for the October 1989 issue; Guy Matthews became the new editor while the games ratings changed back to percentages.

=== The Forever Changing Face Of ACU – March 1990 to November 1990 ===
March 1990 and one of the largest Gameplan sections yet including, for the first time, a Budget Basement section.

April and the inconsistent game ratings are changed again. The overall rating has changed from the percentage to a picture that represents the score; e.g. Laser Squad gets a sparkling smile rating.

June 1990 and, after a longer than usual stint of stability in the editorial line up, there are more changes; Chris Knight moves up to editor and Marc Jones is the sole reviewer credited.

The publisher changes over to MCM Ltd starting August, still under the MCPC Ltd division as before.

A Turrican comic strip/players guide begins in the November 1990 issue.

=== The Final Incarnation – December 1990 to May 1992 ===
December 1990 and a completely revamped design; new main logo, a re-established 'ACU Gold Award' accolade which is given to Electronic Zoo’s table top game conversion Subbuteo.

ACU continues unchanged until August 1991 when the games section is renamed 'Bomb Alley'.

The last issue in May 1992 of ACU is published by HHL Publishing.

ACU’s successor, CPC Attack from HHL Publishing, which even advertises for staff in this issue and has a two-page preview slot, will concentrate more on the games playing scene.

== See also ==
- Alan Sugar, the founder of Amstrad.
- Video game journalism
- Magazine
- Video game
- Computing
- History of computer games
