= Bugaboo (The Flea) =

1983 video game

- Developers: Paco & Paco
- Publisher: Quicksilva
- Designers: Paco Suarez; Paco Portalo
- Platforms: ZX Spectrum, Commodore 64, MSX, Amstrad CPC
- Release: 1983
- Genre: Platform
- Mode: Single-player

Bugaboo (The Flea), later published in Spain as La Pulga, is a video game written by the Spanish programming duo Paco Portalo and Paco Suarez for the ZX Spectrum and published by Quicksilva in 1983. It was later released for the Commodore 64, MSX and Amstrad CPC. The Amstrad CPC port was published under the name Roland in the Caves using the Roland character.

Bugaboo, besides being one of the earliest video games made in Spain, is one of the first computer games to include cutscenes. Its publication marked the beginning of the Golden Era of Spanish Software. A sequel was released in Spain by Opera Soft under the title Poogaboo, made by Paco Suarez. Paco Portalo, the other member of Paco & Paco, left the project after the publication of the original game for the ZX Spectrum.

The player takes control of a flea who has fallen into a cavern and must escape, while avoiding a roaming dragon.

== Gameplay ==
Bugaboo at the bottom of the screen with the dragon approaching from the left (ZX Spectrum).

The game begins with an animation depicting Bugaboo, a small, yellow creature with two extremely long legs, jumping around on a colourful planet before accidentally falling through a crack in the planet's surface and falling to the bottom of a cavern.

The player must control Bugaboo and guide him back to the top of the cavern, and out to the safety of the planet's surface.

There are only two control keys: left and right. When a key is held down a gauge at the bottom of the screen begins to fill up. When the key is released, Bugaboo will jump in that direction, with the strength of the jump being determined by how long the key was held down. The cavern is made up of various rocky ledges which Bugaboo may land on, but he can only stand on a flat area and, if a jump is mistimed, Bugaboo may end up on an angled area of rock, or miss the ledge altogether, which will cause him to fall straight down, landing on whatever is below.

Bugaboo can fall from any distance without dying. The only way to lose a life is for Bugaboo to make contact with the large, yellow dragon which wanders around the cave. Bugaboo can escape the dragon by carefully leaping away, or by taking refuge inside one of the smaller caverns that are located around the play area.

== Reception ==
Reception

Review scores
Publication	Score
Crash	92%
Computer and Video Games	8/10 (Game of the Month)
Personal Computer Games	7/10

Award
Publication	Award
Crash	Smash!

Reviews were overwhelmingly positive, with CRASH giving the game 92%, Computer and Video Games awarding it 8/10 and their Game of the Month and Personal Computer Games giving it 7/10.

CRASH said that Bugaboo is a "high quality" arcade game, and "highly addictive", while Personal Computer Games said that the game is appropriate for the players who like a challenge. Computer and Video Games praised the game's "breath-taking" graphics and "perfect" animation and said that a fresh and original approach to game design have been combined to produce another "top rate" game. Tony Hetherington of Computer Gamer magazine included the game in "The Spectrum Collection" - "15 classic games that all Spectrum owners should have".

Bugaboo reached number 3 in the Spectrum Top 10 charts compiled by WH Smith behind Lunar Jetman and Durell's Jungle Trouble. In 1984 the game reached number 2 in the Commodore 64 charts compiled by Boots the Chemist, kept off the number 1 position by Manic Miner and Crazy Kong. Amsoft's version, Roland in the Caves, reached number 4 in the Amstrad chart later in the year. In January 1984 it appeared in the TOP 20 of Your Computer magazine.

== Legacy ==
Bugaboo (The Flea) was one of the first home computer games to contain a cutscene. It was also one of the first games to measure the player's time to completion.

The game's popularity spawned the creation of a book in 2009 entitled Bugaboo, un hito en la Historia del software español by Francisco Portalo Calero (i.e., Paco Portalo, one of the original authors of the game) and published by Universidad de Extremadura, which is available online.
