= Camputers Lynx =

1980s 8-bit British home computer

Lynx
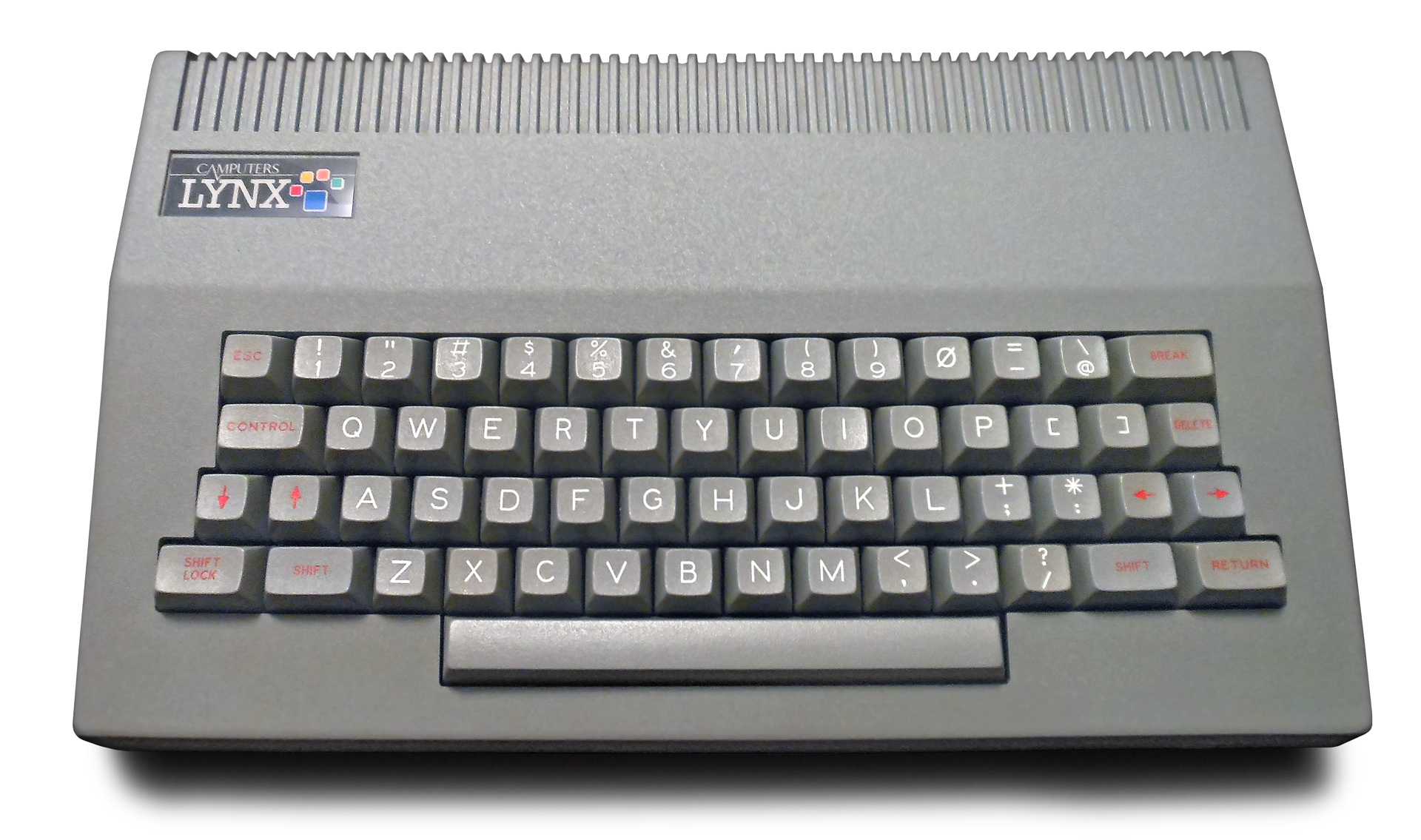
- Camputers Lynx 48k
- Also known as: Leisure, Laureate
- Manufacturer: Camputers
- Released: March 1983; 43 years ago
- Introductory price: £225 (48K), £299 (96K), £345 (128K)
- Discontinued: June 1984
- Units sold: approximately 30,000
- Operating system: BASIC
- CPU: 4 MHz Z80A, (6 MHz for the 128/192 KB models)
- Memory: 48, 96, 192 KB RAM
- Display: 256 x 252, 8 colours
- Graphics: Motorola 6845
- Sound: 6-bit DAC
- Connectivity: Serial port, Tape (600 to 2100 baud), RGB video output, TV RF out, composite video output, lightpen

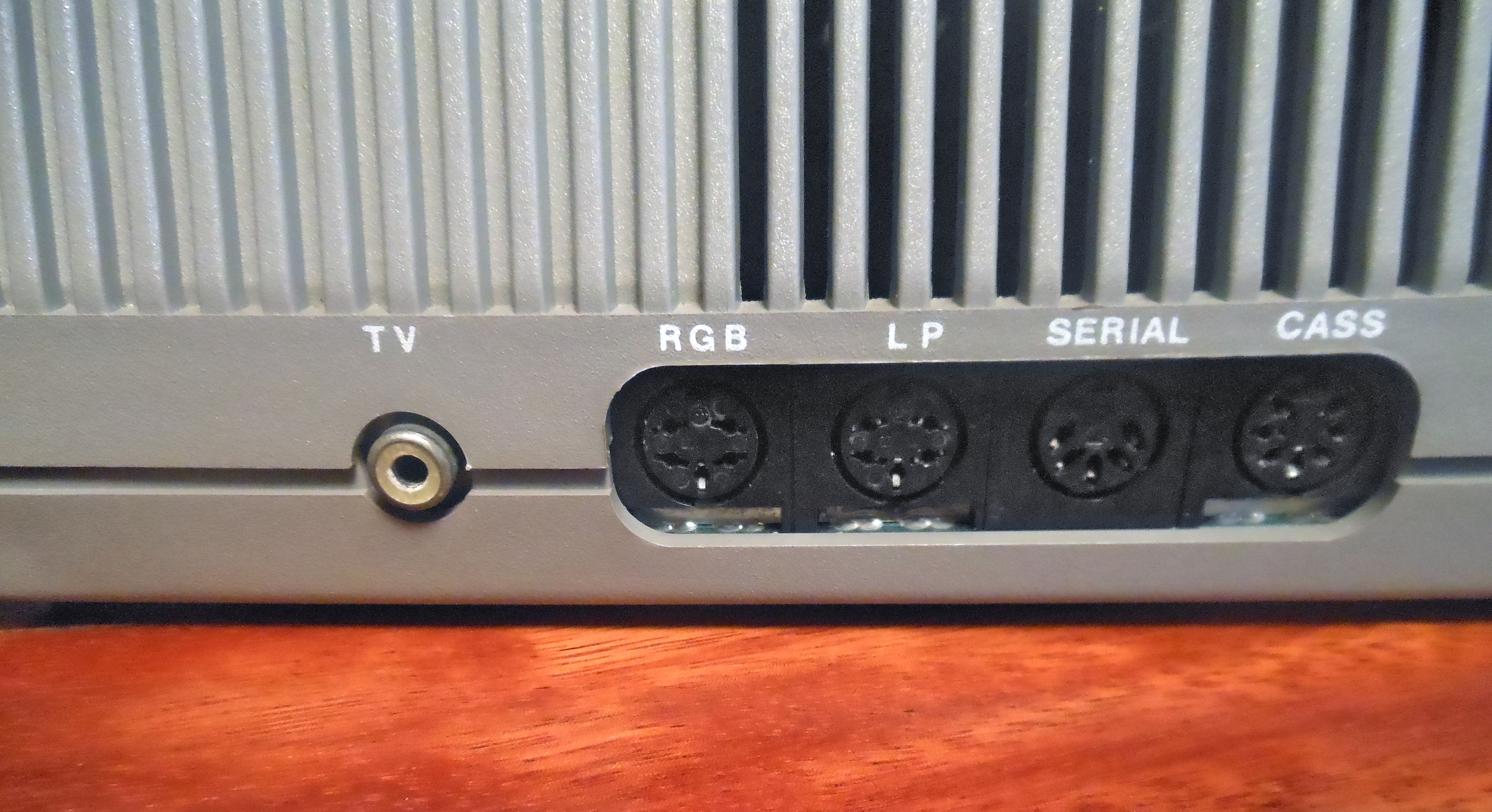
Camputers Lynx 48k - Rear Connectors - Left

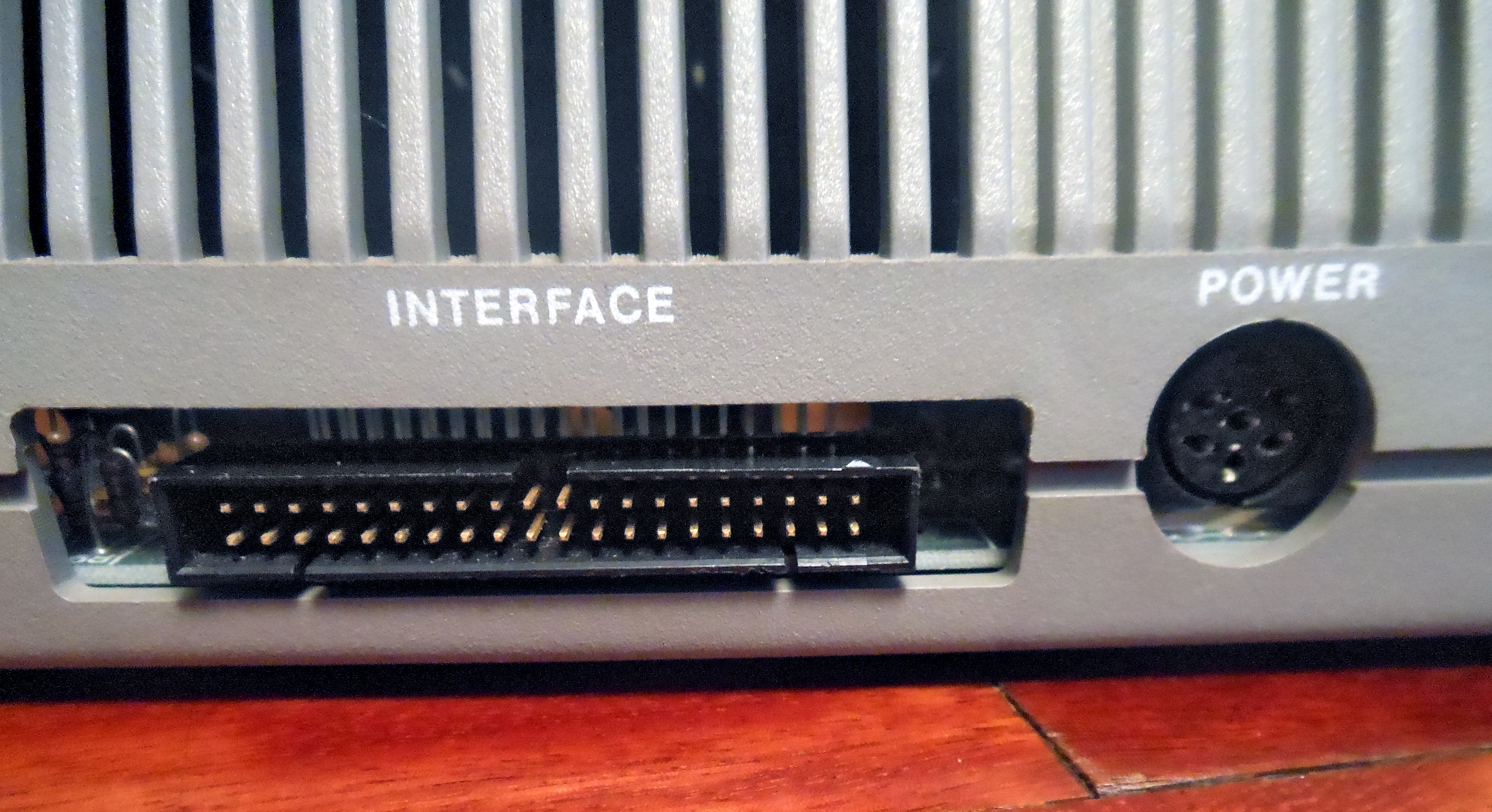
Camputers Lynx 48k - Rear Connectors - Right

The Lynx was an 8-bit British home computer that was first released in early 1983 as a 48 KB model. Several models were available with 48 KB, 96 KB or 128 KB RAM. It was possible to reach 192 KB with RAM expansions on board. John Shireff designed the hardware and Davis Jansons the firmware.

== Details ==
The machine was based around a Z80A CPU clocked at 4 MHz (6 MHz for the 128/192 KB models) and featured a Motorola 6845 as video controller. It was possible to run CP/M with the optional 5.25" floppy disk-drive on the 96 KB and 128 KB models.

Unique features of this computer (compared to other home computers at the time) include:

- All numbers were floating point BCD numbers (even line numbers).
- The computer always ran in "high" resolution graphics mode (256x252 pixels in eight colours) using a 6 x 10 pixel font. Only a few bytes of graphic memory could be manipulated during the horizontal sync period, and thus graphics were extremely slow compared to most other computers.
- Up to 192 KB of RAM and 20 KB of ROM (16 KB on the smallest model) on a 16-bit address bus was implemented using special hardware. As a consequence, certain RAM areas shadowed by ROM could only be used for data storage and the video memory had a green and alternative green bank that could be switched by a hardware register.
- For sound it had a simple (6-bit) DAC. A comparator was included to serve as an ADC (primarily used for reading from tape drives).

Compared to, for example, the Commodore 64, the BASIC was more extensive; but computer games on the other hand suffered from the special implementation and lack of hardware for sound and sprites.

== History ==
The machine was quite advanced for its time. A 48K machine cost £225, a 96K machine £299 and a 128K machine £345. When compared to its competitors, such as the ZX Spectrum and the Oric 1, it was also fairly highly priced. Camputers rebranded and relaunched each machine on several occasions, with the 48K machine renamed the Leisure, and the 128K machine renamed as the Laureate.

The machine had very little software available, and survived only until Camputers ceased trading in June 1984. It is believed that approximately 30,000 Camputers Lynx units were sold worldwide.

Anston Technology took over in November 1984 and a re-launch was planned but never happened. In June 1986, Anston sold everything - hardware, design rights and thousands of cassettes - to the National Lynx User Group. The group planned to produce a Super-Lynx but was too busy supplying spares and technical information to owners of existing models, and the project never came into being.

== Reception ==
After seeing a preview of the Camputers Lynx at the Personal Computer World Show, BYTE in January 1983 stated that it "offers more computing power for the money than any other machine I saw there". Computing Today in June 1983 criticised the manual as "put together in something of a hurry ... confusing" and criticised the computer for not meeting published specifications and having manufacturing defects. It concluded that the Lynx "could be seen as a flawed jewel ... If the less satisfactory aspects can be put to rights, it could prove to be a very popular machine. That, however, could entail some sacrifices."

== Video games ==
There are 60 known commercially released game for the Camputers Lynx

Title	Publisher	Year
3D Monster Craze	Camsoft	1983
Air raid	Camsoft	1983
Alien 8	Ultimate Play the Game	1985
Atom Smasher	Romik Software	1983
Battlebrick	Bus-Tech	1983
Centipede	Play It!	
Colossal Adventure	Level 9 Computing	1983
Compass	Level 9 Computing	1983
Dam Buster	Camsoft	1983
Deathball	Bus-Tech	1983
Delta Wing	Creative Sparks	1984
Diggerman	GEM Software	1984
Draughts	Camsoft	
Dungeon Adventure	Level 9 Computing	1983
Floyds Bank	Romik Software	1983
Football Manager	Addictive Games	1984
Gempak 4: Sea Harrier / Sub Chase	GEM Software	1983
Golf	GEM Software	1983
Gomoku	Netstrak Software	1983
Gridtrap	L' Oeil de Lynx	1984
Hangman	Camsoft	1983
The Hobbit	Melbourne House	1983
Labyrinth	Quazar Computing	1983
L'odyssée d'Asterix	Bibliotheque de Cintre	1984
Logichess	Camsoft	1984
Lord of the Rings	Melbourne House	1986
Lynx Invaders	Camsoft	1983
Mastermind	Willowsoft	1983
Maxi-Mots	L' Oeil de Lynx	1984
Mazeman	Abersoft	1983
Mined-Out	Quicksilva	1983
Monster Mine	GEM Software	1983
Moon	Camsoft	
Moonfall	Camsoft	1983
Muncher	Bus-Tech	1983
Night Flight	L. Corrigan	1984
Oh Mummy!	GEM Software	1983
Panik	Camsoft	1984
Pengo	Play It!	1984
Pontoon	GEM Software	1983
Power Blaster	Camsoft	1983
Protector	Sian Software	1983
Racer	Sian Software	1983
Reversi	GEM Software	1983
Roader	FL Software	1983
Robo-Run	Gazza	1983
Rocketman	Bamby Soft	1983
Siege Attack	Quazar Computing	1984
Snake	GEM Software	1983
Space Trek	Quazar Computing	1983
Spannerman	GEM Software	1983
Spellbound	Bamby Soft	1983
Sultan's Maze	GEM Software	1983
Treasure Island	Camsoft	1983
Twinkle	GEM Software	1983
The Valley	Phoenixx Software	1984
WASP	Romik Software	1984
The Worm	Quazar Computing	1983
Ynxvaders	Bus-Tech	1983
Zombie Panic	Bus-Tech	1983
