= Bitpop =

Music genre

- Stylistic origins: Chiptune; synthpop; electropop; electronica; new wave; video game music
- Cultural origins: 1990s – 2000s (decade), United States, Australia, Japan, and Europe
- Typical instruments: Synthesizer; vocals; bass; sound chip; personal computer; electronic drums

Other topics
- Kawaii future bass; Nintendocore

Bitpop, also known as Chiptune Fusion, is a type of electronic music and subgenre of chiptune music, where at least part of the music is made using the sound chips of 8-bit (or 16-bit) computers and video game consoles.

== Characteristics ==
Among systems used include the Atari 8-bit computers, Commodore 64, Nintendo Entertainment System, and Amiga. The sounds produced from these systems can be combined to any degree with traditional instruments, such as guitar and drums, modern synthesizers and drum machines, or vocals and sound effects.

"Cilantro" from Pix & Bit by Patricia Taxxon is an example of a bitpop song that combines modern production and chiptune synths

Bitpop uses a mixture of old and new equipment often resulting in a sound which is unlike chiptune although containing 8-bit sourced sounds. For example, a bitpop production may be composed almost entirely of 8-bit sounds but with a live vocal or overlaid live guitars. Conversely, a bitpop production may be composed almost entirely of live vocals and instruments but feature a bassline or lead melody provided by an 8-bit device.

== History ==
One of the pioneers of bitpop music were Welle:Erdball, with their heavy use of Commodore 64 for their first album in 1992. Being a German-speaking group not using the term bitpop and who don't travel by plane, they remained popular among people listening to industrial music or electroclash.

Bitpop music began gaining popularity towards the end of the 1990s. The first electroclash record, I-F's "Space Invaders Are Smoking Grass" (1997), has been described as "burbling electro in a vocodered homage to Atari-era hi-jinks," particularly Space Invaders. The Beastie Boys outer-space sci-fi themed album Hello Nasty (1998), included, among other potentially influencing tracks, the distinctively video game sound themed original composition track UNITE; garnering mainstream recognition years ahead of the popular video game tune genre and movement. The trance song "Kernkraft 400" (1999), often played at sports events worldwide, was a remix of a chiptune song written by David Whittaker called "Stardust" for the 1984 Commodore 64 computer game Lazy Jones.

In 2003, Malcolm McLaren wrote an article on bitpop and chip music. It also noted a planned release in that style by McLaren.

By the mid-2000s, 8-bit chip music began being incorporated in mainstream pop music, used by acts such as Beck (for example, the 2005 song "Girl"), The Killers (for example, the 2004 song "On Top"), and particularly The Postal Service in many of their songs. The MIDI-style and FM synthesis of early game music composers such as Hiroshi Kawaguchi also began gaining popularity. In 2003, the J-pop girl group Perfume, along with producer Yasutaka Nakata, began producing music combining chiptunes with synthpop and electro house; their breakthrough came in 2007 with Game, which led to other Japanese female artists using a similar electronic style, including Aira Mitsuki, immi, Mizca, SAWA, Saori@destiny, and Sweet Vacation.

Since the 2000s, 8-bit chiptune sounds, or "video game beats", have been used by a number of mainstream pop artists. Examples in the Western world include artists such as Toby Fox (in his games UNDERTALE and DELTARUNE), Kesha (most notably in "Tik Tok", the best-selling single of 2010), Robyn, Snoop Dogg, Eminem (for example, "Hellbound"), Nelly Furtado, and Timbaland (see Timbaland plagiarism controversy). The influence of video game sounds can also be heard in contemporary British electronica music by artists such as Dizzee Rascal and Kieran Hebden. Grime music in particular samples sawtooth wave sounds from video games which were popular in East London. Dubstep producers have also been influenced by video game chiptunes, particularly the work of Yuzo Koshiro. In 2010, a BBC article stated that the "sights and sounds of old-school games" (naming Frogger and Donkey Kong as examples) are "now becoming a part of mainstream music and culture."

== See also ==
- Circuit bending
- List of electronic music genres
- Music Macro Language
- SIDstation
