= David Whittaker (video game composer) =

English video game composer (born 1957)

- Also known as: DialogueGuru
- Born: 24 April 1957 (age 69); Bury, Lancashire, England
- Occupations: Video game composer; sound artist
- Years active: 1983–present

David Whittaker (born 24 April 1957) is an English video game composer. He is known for writing video game music in most of the 1980s and early 1990s for different formats.

== Career ==
Whittaker cited David Bowie, Kraftwerk and Yazoo among his influences. Before his video game career, he was in a new romantic band called "Beu Leisure". While composing music, Whittaker directly programmed music; instead of using music composition tools, he used a machine code monitor—then an assembler system or program—while including tools from Supersoft and Commodore. He frequently composed for the format on the Commodore 64 and was impressed with the Amiga's sound capabilities, later using sound effects in his compositions for Amiga.

On the Commodore 64 and ZX Spectrum, his most popular compositions are in Lazy Jones, Glider Rider, Armageddon Man, Amaurote, BraveStarr, and Elektra Glide. His subtune 21 of Lazy Jones, commonly known as "Star Dust", was the basis for the electronic song "Kernkraft 400" by Zombie Nation. His compositions also appeared in Amiga games such as Shadow of the Beast, Obliterator, Beyond the Ice Palace, and Speedball. Other formats he has composed for include Amstrad CPC, Atari ST, Atari 8-bit computers, and MSX.

After working for eight years in the US for Electronic Arts at Redwood Shores, he joined British video game developer Traveller's Tales in Knutsford, Cheshire, working as Head of Audio in September 2004.

== Discography ==
Game	Year	System(s)	Publisher	Notes
1st Person Pinball	1989	Atari ST, Amiga	Tynesoft	
007: Licence to Kill	1989	Atari ST, Commodore 64, Amiga, Amstrad CPC, ZX Spectrum	Domark	
11-a-Side Soccer	1989	Amstrad CPC	Codemasters	
180	1986	Commodore 64, Atari 8-bit	Mastertronic	Arranged music for Atari 8-bit Jason C. Brooke
Alfred Chicken	1993	Amiga, Amiga CD³²	Mindscape	Sound effects on CD32
Alien Syndrome	1988	Amiga	Sega	
Amaurote	1987	Commodore 64, Amstrad CPC, Atari 8-bit, ZX Spectrum, MSX	Mastertronic	
American Turbo-King	1989	Amstrad CPC		
APB	1989	Atari ST, Commodore 64, Amiga, Amstrad CPC	Tengen	Also known as All Points Bulletin
Arcade Flight Simulator	1989	Commodore 64, Amstrad CPC	Codemasters	
Archipelagos	1989	Atari ST, Amiga	Logotron	
Army Moves	1988	Atari ST, Amiga	Ocean	
ATV Simulator	1987	Amstrad CPC, Commodore 64, ZX Spectrum		Also known as All Terrain Vehicle Simulator
Aussie Games	1990	Amstrad CPC		
Back to the Future Part II	1990	Atari ST, Commodore 64, Amiga, Amstrad CPC	Image Works	
Bad Company	1990	Atari ST, Amiga	Logotron	
Ball Crazy	1987	Commodore 64	Mastertronic	
Barbarian II: The Dungeon of Drax	1989	GX4000, Amstrad CPC		
Barbarian: The Ultimate Warrior	1987	Amstrad CPC		Also known as Death Sword
Battle For The Ashes	1995	Amiga	Audiogenic	
Beverly Hills Cop	1990	Amstrad CPC, Atari ST, Commodore 64, ZX Spectrum	Tynesoft	
Beyond the Ice Palace	1988	Atari ST, Commodore 64, Amiga, Amstrad CPC, ZX Spectrum	Elite Systems	
Blazer	1987	Commodore 64	Nexus	
Blood Money	1989	Amiga	Psygnosis	Made sound effects, not music
BMX Freestyle	1989	Amstrad CPC		
BMX Simulator	1986	Atari ST, Commodore 64, Amiga, Atari 8-bit, Amstrad CPC	Codemasters	
BraveStarr	1987	Commodore 64, Amstrad CPC	GO!	
Brian Lara Cricket	1995	Amiga	Audiogenic	
Brian Lara Cricket '96	1996	Amiga	Audiogenic	
Bronx Street Cop	1989	Amstrad CPC		
Bubble Bobble	1989	Amiga	Firebird	Arranged from the arcade game, original by Zuntata
Bubble Dizzy	1991	Amstrad CPC		
Buffalo Bill's Rodeo Games	1989	Amstrad CPC, Atari ST, Commodore 64, Amiga, ZX Spectrum	Tynesoft	Also known as Buffalo Bill's Wild West Show
Captain Fizz Meets the Blaster-Trons	1989	Commodore 64, ZX Spectrum	Psyclapse	
Carrier Command	1988	Amiga	Rainbird	Menu music
Challenge Golf	1991	Atari ST	On-Line Entertainment	
Cheap Skate	1988	Commodore 64	Silverbird	
The Chicken Farm	1986	Commodore 64		
Chip's Challenge	1990	Atari ST, Amiga, Amstrad CPC	U.S. Gold	
Chrono Quest	1988	Atari ST, Amiga	Psygnosis	
Circus Games	1989	Amstrad CPC		
Cloud Kingdoms	1990	Atari ST, Amiga	Millennium	
Colony	1987	Atari 8-bit	Mastertronic	
Cosmic Pirate	1989	Atari ST, Amiga	Palace	
Cosmonut	1987	Commodore 64	Codemasters	
Custodian	1989	Atari ST, Amiga	Hewson	Working title: Kalashnikov
Dan Dare III: The Escape	1990	Atari ST, Amiga	Virgin Mastertronic	
Dark Castle	1988	Commodore 64	Three-Sixty Pacific	
Days of Thunder	1990	Atari ST, Amiga, Game Boy, MS-DOS	Mindscape	
Death Stalker	1989	Amstrad CPC, ZX Spectrum	Codemasters	
Defcom	1986	Commodore 64, Amstrad CPC, ZX Spectrum	Quicksilva	
Defender of the Crown	1987	Atari ST	Cinemaware	Arrangement from Amiga version, original music by Jim Cuomo and Bill Williams
Dizzy – The Ultimate Cartoon Adventure	1988	Commodore 64	Codemasters	
Dizzy: Prince of the Yolkfolk	1991	Amstrad CPC	Codemasters	
Dogs of War	1989	Atari ST, Amiga	Elite Systems	
Double Dragon II: The Revenge	1989	Amstrad CPC		
Dynamic Duo	1989	Commodore 64, Amstrad CPC	Firebird	
E.T.'s Rugby League	1992	Amiga	Sega	
Elektra Glide	1986	Commodore 64, Amstrad CPC	English Software	Arranged soundtrack from Atari 8-bit, original music by Adam Billyard
Elevator Action	1987	Commodore 64, Amstrad CPC, ZX Spectrum	Quicksilva	
Emlyn Hughes Arcade Quiz	1990	Atari ST, Commodore 64, Amiga	Audiogenic	
Emlyn Hughes International Soccer	1990	Atari ST, Amiga	Audiogenic	
Enduro Racer	1987	Atari ST, Commodore 64	Activision	
Epic	1992	Atari ST, Commodore 64, Amiga	Ocean	
Exterminator	1990	Commodore 64		
Eye of Horus	1989	Atari ST, Amiga	Logotron	
Fantasy World Dizzy	1989	Amstrad CPC	Codemasters	
Fast Food	1989	Amstrad CPC		
Feud	1987	Commodore 64, Atari 8-bit, Amstrad CPC	Bulldog	Arranged music for Atari 8-bit Jason C. Brooke
Fire and Brimstone	1990	Atari ST, Amiga	Firebird	
Fright Night	1988	Amiga	Microdeal	
Fruit Machine Simulator 2	1990	Amstrad CPC	Codemasters	
Future Sport	1989	Atari ST	Actual Screenshots	
Garfield: Big Fat Hairy Deal	1988	Atari ST, Amiga	Softek	
Gazza II	1991	Atari ST, Commodore 64, Amiga	Empire Interactive	
Ghostbusters II	1989	Commodore 64, Amstrad CPC	Activision	
Ghosts 'n Goblins	1986	Amstrad CPC	Elite Systems	
Gilbert: Escape From Drill	1989	Amstrad CPC		
Glider Rider	1986	Commodore 64, Amstrad CPC, ZX Spectrum	Quicksilva	
Global Commander	1987	Commodore 64	Martech	Also known as The Armageddon Man
The Gold of the Aztecs	1990	Atari ST, Amiga	U.S. Gold	
Golden Axe	1990	Atari ST, Amiga	Virgin Mastertronic	Arranged from the arcade game
Goldrunner II	1988	Atari ST	Microdeal	
Graham Gooch World Class Cricket	1993	Atari ST, Amiga	Audiogenic	Also known as Allan Border Cricket
Graham Gooch World Class Cricket - Test Match Special Edition	1994	Amiga	Audiogenic	
Graham Gooch's Second Innings	1993	Atari ST, Amiga	Audiogenic	
Grand Prix Simulator	1987	Commodore 64, Atari 8-bit	Codemasters	
Grand Prix Simulator II	1989	Amstrad CPC	Codemasters	
Grange Hill	1987	Commodore 64, Amstrad CPC, ZX Spectrum	Argus Press Software	
Grimblood	1990	Atari ST, Amiga	Virgin	
Gunship 2000	1993	Amiga	MicroProse	
Helter Skelter	1990	Commodore 64, Amstrad CPC	Audiogenic	
Hocus Focus	1986	Commodore 64	Quicksilva	
Humphrey	1983	Commodore 64	Mr Micro	
The Hunt for Red October	1987	Amiga	Grand Slam Software	
Hunter Killer	1989	Atari ST	Virgin Mastertronic	
Hyperbowl	1987	Commodore 64, Amstrad CPC	Mastertronic	
Indoor Soccer	1989	Amstrad CPC	Codemasters	
Infection	1989	Commodore 64, Amiga, Amstrad CPC	Virgin Mastertronic	
International Rugby Simulator	1988	Amstrad CPC, Atari ST	Codemasters	Also known as Advanced Rugby Simulator
International Soccer Challenge	1990	Atari ST, Amiga	MicroProse	
International Speedway	1988	Amstrad CPC		
IO	1988	Commodore 64	Firebird	
Iron Horse	1988	Commodore 64	Konami	
Iron Lord	1989	Atari ST	Ubi Soft	
The Island of Dr. Destructo	1987	Commodore 64	Bulldog	
Jail Break	1987	Commodore 64, Amstrad CPC	Konami	
Jaws	1989	Atari ST, Amiga	Martech	
Jupiter's Masterdrive	1990	Atari ST, Amiga	Ubi Soft	
Kid Gloves	1990	Atari ST, Amiga	Millennium	
Kikstart 2	1987	Amiga	Mastertronic	
Killing Cloud	1991	Atari ST, Amiga	Image Works	
Knight Games	1986	Commodore 64	English Software	
Knight Tyme	1988	Commodore 64	Mastertronic	
Knightmare	1988	Atari ST	Activision	
Krusty's Fun House	1993	Amiga	Acclaim Virgin	Also known as Krusty's Super Fun House
Last Mission	1987	Commodore 64	U.S. Gold	
Lazer Force	1987	Commodore 64	Codemasters	
Lazy Jones	1984	Commodore 64	Terminal Software	
Leatherneck	1988	Atari ST, Amiga	Microdeal	
The Legend of William Tell	1990	Atari ST, Amiga	Martech	Also known as Crossbow: The Legend of William Tell
Lemmings 2: The Tribes	1993	Atari ST, Amiga	Psygnosis	
Leviathan	1987	Atari ST, Commodore 64, Amiga, Amstrad CPC, ZX Spectrum	English Software	Also known as Straf
Little Icarus	1983	Commodore 64	Mr Micro	
The Living Daylights	1987	Commodore 64, Atari 8-bit, Amstrad CPC	Domark	
Lone Wolf: The Mirror of Death	1991	Commodore 64, Amstrad CPC	Audiogenic	
Loopz	1990	Atari ST, Commodore 64, Amiga, Amstrad CPC, ZX Spectrum	Audiogenic	Working title: Convolution
Magicland Dizzy	1990	Amstrad CPC	Codemasters	
Max Headroom	1986	Commodore 64, Amstrad CPC	Quicksilva	
Mayhem	1983	Commodore 64	Mr Micro	
Menace	1988	Atari ST, Commodore 64, Amiga	Psyclapse (Psygnosis)	This song is also heard on the Menace themed level of Lemmings. Working titles: Coppercon1, Draconia
Miami Dice	1986	Commodore 64	Bug-Byte	
Milk Race	1987	Commodore 64, Atari 8-bit, Amstrad CPC	Mastertronic	Arranged music for Atari 8-bit Tiny Williams
Millennium 2.2	1989	Atari ST, Amiga	Activision	Arrangement of Mahler's adagio from 5th symphony. Also known as Millenium: Return To Earth
Mission Omega	1986	Amstrad CPC		
The Model	1986	Commodore 64		
Monte Carlo Casino	1989	Amstrad CPC		
Moto Cross Simulator	1989	Amstrad CPC		
Mr Wino	1988	Commodore 64	Silverbird	
Mr. Heli	1987	Atari ST	Firebird	
Ninja	1987	Atari ST	Mastertronic	Also known as Ninja Mission
Ninja Massacre	1989	Amstrad CPC		
Nitro Boost Challenge	1989	Atari ST	Codemasters	
Obliterator	1988	Atari ST, Amiga	Psygnosis	
Operation Gunship	1989	Amstrad CPC		
Outcast	1987	Atari ST	Mastertronic	
Paddle Mania	1988	Commodore 64		
Pandora	1988	Atari ST, Amiga	Firebird	
Pandora's Box	1983	Commodore 64	Mr Micro	
Panther	1986	Commodore 64, Atari 8-bit	Mastertronic	
Platoon	1988	Atari ST, Amiga, Amstrad CPC, ZX Spectrum	Ocean	
Poltergeist	1988	Commodore 64	Codemasters	
Professional BMX Simulator	1988	Amstrad CPC	Codemasters	
Professional Snooker Simulator	1988	Commodore 64	Codemasters	
Pub Trivia Simulator	1989	Amstrad CPC		
Punchy	1983	Commodore 64	Mr Micro	
Quadralien	1988	Atari ST, Amiga	Logotron	
Quartet	1987	Commodore 64	Activision	
The Race Against Time	1988	Commodore 64, Amstrad CPC	Codemasters	
Rampage	1987	Atari ST	Activision	
The Real Ghostbusters	1988	Atari ST, Amiga, Amstrad CPC, Commodore 64, ZX Spectrum	Activision	
Red Max	1987	Commodore 64, Atari 8-bit	Codemasters	
Renaissance	1990	Atari ST, Amiga	Impressions	Also known as Classic 4
Renegade	1987	Atari ST	Mastertronic	
Return to Genesis	1988	Atari ST, Amiga	Firebird	Working title: Clonworld 50
RoadBlasters	1988	Atari ST, Commodore 64, Amiga, Amstrad CPC, ZX Spectrum	U.S. Gold	
Rugby League Coach	1994	Atari ST, Amiga	Audiogenic	
Rygar	1987	Commodore 64, Amstrad CPC	U.S. Gold	
The Sentinel	1988	Amiga	Firebird	Also known as The Sentry
Shadow of the Beast	1989	Atari ST, Amiga, Amstrad CPC, ZX Spectrum	Psygnosis	
Shadow Skimmer	1987	Amstrad CPC		
SideWinder	1988	Atari ST, Amiga	Mastertronic	
SimCity	1990	Atari ST	Maxis	
Skateball	1989	Atari ST	Ubi Soft	
Sláine	1988	Commodore 64	Martech	
Slap Fight	1988	Atari ST	Ocean	Also known as A.L.C.O.N.
Snoopy: The Cool Computer Game	1989	Atari ST, Amiga, Commodore CDTV	Softek	Also known as: Snoopy And Peanuts, Snoopy: The Case of the Missing Blanket
Snow Strike	1990	Atari ST, Amiga, Amstrad CPC	U.S. Gold	
Soccer Skills	1989	Amstrad CPC, Commodore 64	Codemasters	
Solomon's Key	1987	Commodore 64, Amstrad CPC	U.S. Gold	
Speedball	1988	Atari ST, Commodore 64, Amiga	Image Works	
Spellbound Dizzy	1991	Amstrad CPC	Codemasters	
Spitting Image	1989	Atari ST, Commodore 64, Amiga, Amstrad CPC	Domark	
Split Personalities	1986	Commodore 64	Domark	
Spore	1987	Commodore 64	Bulldog	
Sporting Triangles	1989	Atari ST, Commodore 64, Amiga, Amstrad CPC	CDS	
Star Trek: The Rebel Universe	1987	Atari ST	Firebird	
Star Wars	1987	Atari ST, Commodore 64, Amstrad CPC	Domark	
Star Wars: The Empire Strikes Back	1988	Atari ST, Amiga, Amstrad CPC	Domark	
Starblaze	1989	Atari ST, Amiga	Logotron	
StarRay	1988	Atari ST	Logotron	
Storm	1986	Commodore 64, Atari 8-bit	Mastertronic	
Stormbringer	1988	Commodore 64, ZX Spectrum	MAD/Mastertronic	
Stormtrooper	1989	Atari ST, Amiga	Creation	
Street Gang Soccer	1989	Amstrad CPC		
Street Soccer	1989	Amstrad CPC		
Street Surfer	1986	Commodore 64	Entertainment USA	
Super G-Man	1987	Commodore 64	Codemasters	
Super League Manager	1995	Amiga	Audiogenic	
Super Robin Hood	1987	Commodore 64	Codemasters	
Super Stuntman	1988	Atari ST, Commodore 64, Amstrad CPC	Codemasters	
Supremacy: Your Will Be Done	1990	Atari ST	Virgin Mastertronic	Also known as Overlord
Terra Cognita	1986	Commodore 64	Codemasters	
Tetris	1987	Atari ST, Amiga, Amstrad CPC, ZX Spectrum	Mirrorsoft	
ThunderCats	1988	Amiga	Elite Systems	Arranged from Commodore 64 game, original song by Rob Hubbard
Total Recall	1990	Atari ST, Amiga	Ocean	
Transformers: The Game	2007	PlayStation 2, PlayStation 3, Wii, Xbox 360, Windows	Activision	Alongside Steve Jablonsky, Jonathan Flood, and Adam Hay
Transmuter	1987	Atari 8-bit, Amstrad CPC	Codemasters	
Trantor: The Last Stormtrooper	1987	Atari ST, Commodore 64, Amstrad CPC, ZX Spectrum	GO!	
Treasure Island	1984	Commodore 64	Mr Micro	
Treasure Island Dizzy	1989	Amstrad CPC	Codemasters	
Triple Tournament	1984	Commodore 64	Terminal Software	
The Tube	1987	Commodore 64	Quicksilva	
Turbo Chopper Simulator	1989	Amstrad CPC		
Vampire	1987	Commodore 64	Codemasters	
Verminator	1989	Atari ST	Rainbird	
Voodoo Nightmare	1990	Atari ST	Palace Software	
Wanderer 3D	1988	Amiga	Elite Systems	
War Cars Construction Kit	1988	Commodore 64	Elite	
Warlock: The Avenger	1990	Atari ST	U.S. Gold	
Weird Dreams	1989	Atari ST, Amiga	MicroProse	
Wembley Rugby League	1994	Amiga	Audiogenic	
Whirligig	1988	Amiga	Firebird	Also known as SpaceCutter
Willow Pattern	1985	Commodore 64	Firebird	
Wizard's Pet	1987	Commodore 64	Mastertronic	
Wonder Boy in Monster Land	1989	Atari ST, Amiga, Amstrad CPC	Activision	Arranged from the arcade game, original songs by Shinichi Sakamoto. Also known as Super Wonder Boy In Monsterland
World Class Rugby	1991	Atari ST, Amiga, Amstrad CPC	Audiogenic	
World Class Rugby '95	1995	Amiga	Audiogenic	
World Class Rugby: Five Nations Edition	1992	Amiga	Audiogenic	
Wrath of the Demon	1991	Atari ST, Commodore 64, Amiga	ReadySoft	
Wreckers	1991	Atari ST, Amiga	Audiogenic	
Xenon	1988	Atari ST, Amiga, Amstrad CPC, MSX, ZX Spectrum	Melbourne House	
Xenon 2: Megablast	1989	Atari ST, Amiga, Commodore CDTV, Master System, MS-DOS	Mirrorsoft	Title song is a rearrangement of the song "Megablast" from the album Into the Dragon by Bomb the Bass
Zombi	1987	Atari ST	Ubi Soft	
Zub	1986	Commodore 64, Amstrad CPC, ZX Spectrum	Mastertronic	
