= Deathrow (video game) =

2002 sports video game

- European cover art
- Developer: Southend Interactive
- Publisher: Ubi Soft
- Producer: Anders Jeppsson
- Programmers: Anders Jeppsson; Daniel Jeppsson
- Artists: Peter Ekstrand; Magnus Bergholtz
- Composer: Novocaine.p
- Platform: Xbox
- Release: EU: 18 October 2002; NA: 22 October 2002
- Genre: Sports
- Modes: Single-player, multiplayer

Deathrow is a 2002 sports video game developed by Southend Interactive and published by Ubi Soft for the Xbox as an exclusive. Deathrow's development began in May 1999 as an online PC game. In early 2001, Southend transitioned to an Xbox console release, which let the team use pixel shaders, bump mapped textures, and specular lighting. Deathrow was built on an in-house 3D game engine and was Southend's first full release.

The game is based on the fictional extreme sport Blitz, a futuristic full-contact hybrid of hockey and basketball played with a flying disc. Two teams of four players attempt to move the disc through their opponent's goal, and teams can either win on points or by knocking out their opposing team. There are 150 individual characters across 18 thematic teams. The single-player campaign's plot is set in the 23rd century, when Blitz is a popular, televised sport and the teams battle to scale the ranks and win the championship. Players earn credits from their goals scored, opponent knockouts, and crowd-pleasing to be spent on player upgrades, bets, and new teammates. The game also supports split-screen and System Link multiplayer for up to eight players across up to eight Xbox consoles.

Deathrow received largely favorable reviews. Reviewers praised the game's fast-paced action, and surround sound, but complained of its high difficulty curve, generic soundtrack, and lack of online multiplayer. Some critics felt the game's use of profanity was excessive, while others thought it was a highlight. Reviewers considered the game's concept and mechanics similar to other series, specifically Speedball. IGN and TeamXbox both named Deathrow an Editor's Choice. The game won the TeamXbox 2002 Breakthrough Game of the Year award and the IGN 2002 Best Game Nobody Played. IGN later reported that a sequel would be unlikely due to the original's low revenue. Southend dissolved in 2013.

== Gameplay ==
Deathrow is set in the year 2219, where Blitz is the world's most popular sport. Players attempt to toss a disc through a hoop while avoiding full-contact from their opponents, including punches, kicks, throws, and stomps. Like a futuristic rugby, the sport combines elements of hockey, basketball, and full-contact American football. Critics compared the game's mechanics to Discs of Tron, Mortal Kombat, Blood Bowl, Final Fantasy X's Blitzball, Blades of Steel, and Speedball, and its aesthetic to that of Blade Runner. The game's premise was also compared to the 1975 film Rollerball.

Action view in a game of the Disciples against the Blitzers

There are four rounds in a match of Blitz, where two teams of four computer or human players score points for each energized Blitz disc thrown through their opponent's hoop, which is eight feet off the ground. Players pass and travel with the disc across the arenas, and the game continues without pause between points scored. The team with the most points at the end of a match wins. Players can choose to brawl when not scoring points. Fighting depletes character health, depending on who takes the blows. Once his health is completely depleted, a character is removed from the game, and teams with all players knocked out are disqualified (though players can be substituted between rounds). If a player tends towards belligerence, the game's artificial intelligence will compensate and exact revenge for its teammates. Friendly fire, where teammates can intentionally or inadvertently hurt each other with attacks meant for their opponents, is permitted.

There are 150 unique players on 18 teams, each with thematic personalities in appearance, play style, and profanity. Teams also vary in skill set, and attributes such as defense, speed, strength, and teamwork. Examples include the Sea Cats (fast all-female team with European accents), the Marines (who wear camouflaged garb and use military jargon), the Demons (high strength attribute with demonic language), and the Black Dragons (ninjas with high agility and combat skills). Teams battle in 32 arenas—one half with traditional, open-style stadiums, and the other half with environmental obstacles, such as the underground mines. Minor power-ups including health, credits, and skill augments for individual players regenerate regularly on the field.

Players earn credits for knocking out opponents, scoring points, and impressing the crowd with violence and skill. The credits can be used towards player enhancements such as black market performance-enhancing drugs. A crowd meter displays audience support, which boosts the player's team abilities when filled. IGN found the game to heavily rely on teamwork. Computer players on teams rated with low teamwork will not take initiative to pursue the disc or to help teammates in need. This attribute can be raised over the course of a game. Players can call plays including physical offense, fast offense, neutral, defense, and goal defense.

The game supports single-player, four-player local multiplayer, and System Link with up to eight players across up to eight Xbox consoles, but does not support Xbox Live online play. Deathrow has a futuristic electronic dance music soundtrack and over 3,000 words of voice acting. It also supports 5.1 surround sound and customized soundtracks. The game is backward compatible with the Xbox 360.

=== Controls ===
Players use the Xbox controller's left analog stick to move the character, the right stick to strafe, and the main buttons to jump, block, punch, and kick. When on offense, the latter two functions become "pass" and "shoot". Players switch between characters and taunt with the white and black buttons, respectively, and call plays with the directional pad. The left trigger modifies an existing action, such as running into dives, slide-tackles, and grabs, and the right trigger orients the camera towards the objective (either the disc or the goal, depending on the team in possession). This camera control is designed for precision when diving for the disc or shooting on goal. A character in possession of the disc will show a trajectory line of their potential shot or pass, which is altered by player movement, breath, and physical contact. Players charge the disc by holding the shooting button, whereby the disc turns greener as the shot grows more powerful. A fully charged shot called a Deathrow will incapacitate any player it hits, while overcharged shots electrify and stun the carrier.

Before each game and single-player Conquest, players choose between Sports and Action camera views. Action view is a trailing third-person shot similar to looking over the player-character's shoulder, while Sports view is a spectator perspective similar that of a televised basketball game. Enclosed arenas are inaccessible when using Sports view. The camera view cannot be changed once single-player begins, so Conquest mode players in Sports view will not see the arenas they unlock. The Action view camera swings wildly and can be pulled back slightly in the menus.

=== Campaign ===
The in-game story of Blitz begins in 2197 as a Los Angeles gang sport used to find recruits. Over 20 years later, the illegal sport is picked up for broadcast by the Prime Network, who forms the Blitz Disc Association (BDA) and plans for the first Blitz competition with exhibition games and prize money. Through exhibition games and prize money, 13 teams of humans with various competitive augmentations are chosen to compete.

Conquest, the single-player tournament career mode, pits the player's team against the ranked hierarchy en route to the championship. Up to three additional human players can join in the single-player. Players initially choose between four teams, though 13 total are unlockable. Teams begin with four players with no alternates for substitution, and fight their way from fourth place in the Rookie Division to first place against each team in between. Players can continue to take challenges within the division before irrevocably moving on to the next division.

The player's team receives randomized, team-specific textual messages in between games, including offers for free agent offers, training sessions, drugs, bets on the player's performance, and events including accidental gifts from the player's manager, threats from the team's owner, and organized crime extortions. Players can buy character attribute increases with their credits. Single-player progress unlocks concept art and game assets external to the game, as well as new teams, players, and arenas. Each of the unlockable 13 teams has six unlockable players (for a total of 10 players on each), and five additional legacy teams are limited to four players apiece. Multi-disc and "Extreme" difficulty gameplay options are also unlockable.

== Development ==
Deathrow was developed by Southend Interactive and produced by Ubisoft. Five friends opened Southend in Malmö, Sweden in 1998 to fulfill their childhood ambitions to make video games. Southend began Deathrow development in May 1999 and expected the game to be an online PC video game tentatively titled Blitz Disc Arena. The idea for the sports game descended from a combination of Speedball 2, the Quake and Unreal series, and Tekken. Southend's nine-person team received Xbox development kits in June 2000 and decided to move the game to console in early 2001. According to Southend animator Rodrigo Cespedes in a 2002 TeamXbox interview, "Xbox was the only console that would allow [them] to produce the game as it was originally envisioned", adding that Microsoft and Ubisoft encouraged the mature direction with emphasis on blood, brutality, and profanity. Thus they began to port the game to the console for its feature capabilities, including vertex and pixel shaders for bump mapped environmental textures and character animations, specular lighting, and bumped reflection mapping.

The game was developed on an in-house 3D game engine under construction for multiple years. Each character is made of over 7000 polygons and 55 bones, making for players with facial expressions, over 800 animations, and a capacity to blink. Character faces can additionally express emotions like happiness or anger, and feelings of pain. The move to Xbox led to greater variation in the team personalities. The artists drew many options for each team and the developers chose from the lot. Deathrow was designed for the Action camera view, but Sports view was introduced to expand the game's appeal.

Deathrow was displayed at Ubisoft's E3 2002 booth, and was released on 18 October 2002 in Europe, and on 22 October 2002 in the United States as an Xbox exclusive. The game did not include Xbox Live online multiplayer for want of development time. At the time of release, Southend had no plans to release downloadable content, though they implemented a method to do so. (Note: There is an "Upgrade" option on the game's menu that would allow downloadable content to be downloaded to the Xbox.) The game was Southend's first full release.

== Reception ==
Reception

Aggregate score
Aggregator	Score
Metacritic	79/100

Review scores
Publication	Score
1Up.com	C+
Electronic Gaming Monthly	4.5/10
Game Informer	5/10
GameSpot	8.7/10
GameSpy	4/5
IGN	9.3/10
Official Xbox Magazine (US)	7.4/10
TeamXbox	9/10

Deathrow received "generally favorable" reviews, according to video game review aggregator Metacritic. IGN and TeamXbox both named Deathrow an Editor's Choice. The game won TeamXbox's 2002 Breakthrough Game of the Year award and IGN's 2002 Best Xbox Game Nobody Played. It was also runner-up for their Xbox action game of the year. Of the year's praiseworthy yet unappreciated games, IGN said it alone blew us away." GameSpot similarly named it one of the year's most unfairly overlooked Xbox titles. Critics praised the game's fast, chaotic action and use of surround sound. The reviewers bemoaned its high difficulty curve, generic soundtrack, and lack of online multiplayer. Some reviewers thought the game used profanity excessively, while others considered it a highlight.

David Hodgson of Electronic Gaming Monthly (EGM) found Deathrow's European origins apparent as "awkward, over-the-top expletives in obnoxious American accents" were paired with rugby. Hodgson said that Deathrow struggled to show grittiness in a very shiny environment. He added that the game suffered from immoderate violence, frustrating fighting sequences, lack of online play, and "steep learning curve". Hodgson compared the core mechanics to a "mini-game masquerading as sports entertainment". William Racer of the Official Xbox Magazine (OXM) praised the fast-paced nature of the game and its eye for detail, and complained about the camera angles and difficulty. He placed the game in a lineage of invented sports from a dystopian future and found the game more entertaining than the rest. Racer also found the music generic, and the voice acting good. Eric Bush of TeamXbox complimented the computer opponents's artificial intelligence and said that they put up a challenge. GameSpy's Osborne appreciated the game's small details like the streak trailing the disc through the air. IGN's Kaiser Hwang called the arena lighting effects, bump mapping, and textures the best since Halo: Combat Evolved. 1UP.com, OXM's Racer, and IGN's Douglass Perry and David Clayman recommended Deathrow as a party game, with the IGN staff specifically recommending the game with System Link.

GameSpot's Greg Kasavin spoke highly of the tight controls and accessible gameplay in spite of a larger learning curve. IGN's Goldstein described the controls as "relatively simple" and easy to understand within a single game, and Scott Osborne of GameSpy found the controls awkward but easily learned. In comparison, Charles Herold of The New York Times and a friend could not figure out Blitz's rules for 20 minutes, feeling "too macho" to do the tutorial. Pittsburgh Post-Gazette's Jonathan Silver thought the gameplay was too frenzied, like "NHL Hitz on steroids". Hilary Goldstein of IGN's only complaint about the controls was the camera's looseness. She noted the game's "serious attitude" and "very gritty view of sports", and similar to hockey, felt that the non-disc action was "one of the nicest aspects" of the game. She praised the graphics and environments, surround sound, the array of unlockables, the single-player, and its replay value, but bemoaned the lack of options to change between camera views, the Action view in general, and the indistinguishability between players. Goldstein regarded Deathrow's profanity as the "best use of endless cursing in a game... ever". Herold of The New York Times noted violence's centrality to the game and figured that the game's age restrictions were likely due to the "savage profanities", which he felt gave the game personality unlike other sports video games. He added that the game's frantic speed kept him too consumed to curse at the game himself. The Atlanta Journal-Constitution's Troy Oxford also connected the profanity to the game's "'M' rating".

Edge referred to Deathrow as a substance-less and "contrived clone" of the 1990 Speedball 2, which used a ball instead of a disc. David Hodgson of EGM similarly praised the 1990 title in comparison. William Racer of OXM did not mind the two games' similarities and added that "you might as well copy from the best". While Kasavin of GameSpot thought the theme was tired, The Atlanta Journal-Constitution's Oxford wrote that the game felt "fresh". Reflecting on the release year, IGN director Peer Schneider said that games like Deathrow showed the games industry's ability to make new, high-caliber franchises. Two IGN staffers predicted the game to be a sleeper hit: one noted the sparse press compared to the game's quality, and the other explained that Ubisoft was busy promoting bigger titles such as Tom Clancy's Splinter Cell, Dragon's Lair 3D, and Rayman.

=== Legacy ===
In 2006, TeamXbox's Matthew Fisher determined that the game aged well. In 2012, Complex Gaming listed Deathrow 13th on its 15 Most Violent Sports Video Games. Scottish developer Ludometrics described their 2014 video game Bodycheck as a spiritual successor to Deathrow, Speedball 2, and Skateball, though the game is set in the medieval past instead of the ultraviolent future.

Around the time of launch, Southend was interested in producing a sequel. In March 2004, IGN listed Deathrow 2 as one of its five desired Xbox sequels, specifically for Xbox Live online play support. IGN placed its chances at a 90% likelihood. IGN reported a month later that despite interest from Southend, Ubisoft would be unlikely to release a forthcoming Deathrow sequel due to the original's low revenue. Southend separated from its Swedish IT consulting firm parent company, Tacet Holding AB, and became a fully independent company in April 2013. With it, Southend CEO Fredrik Brönjemark announced that "now is the right time for Southend to manage its own destiny and to invest in its own products", of which Deathrow and ilomilo were examples. Southend closed in June 2013 when its full 24-person staff was hired into Massive Entertainment, another Swedish developer.

== Notes and references ==
Notes
