= Last Mission =

Last Mission may refer to

- The Last Mission, 1950 Greek movie directed by Nikos Tsiforos
- Last Mission (arcade game), 1986 arcade game by Data East
- The Last Mission (video game), 1987 video game by Opera Soft
- The Last Mission (documentary), a documentary about the last hours before the Japanese surrender in World War II
- The Last Mission (2000 film), a 2000 Polish film
- The Last Mission (novel), a novel by Harry Mazer about an underage USAAC soldier in World War II
- Hunter × Hunter: The Last Mission, a 2013 animated film based on the Hunter × Hunter series
