= Kid gloves =

Kid gloves may refer to:

== Clothing ==
- Gloves made from kidskin, leather from young goats

== Music ==
- Kid Gloves, a British production duo consisting of Roy Kerr and Anu Pillai
- Kid Gloves, a 1992 album by Larry Carlton
- "Kid Gloves", by Doomtree from the 2008 album Doomtree
- "Kid Gloves", by Fountains of Wayne from the 2005 album Out-of-State Plates
- "Kid Gloves", by Marmaduke Duke from the 2009 album Duke Pandemonium
- "Kid Gloves", by Rory Gallagher from the 1990 album Fresh Evidence
- "Kid Gloves", by Rush from the 1984 album Grace Under Pressure
- "Kid Gloves", by Surkin from the 2008 Next of Kin EP
- "Kid Gloves", by Voxtrot from the 2007 album Voxtrot
- Metaphor used in "Leif Erikson" from Interpol's 2002 debut album Turn On the Bright Lights

== Film ==
- Kid Gloves (film), a 1929 film with Richard Cramer
- Kid Glove Killer, a 1942 crime film starring Van Heflin

== Other ==
- Kid Gloves (video game)
