= Speedball (video game) =

1988 video game

- Cover art by David John Rowe
- Developer: The Bitmap Brothers
- Publisher: Image Works
- Artist: Mark Coleman
- Composer: David Whittaker
- Platforms: Amiga, Atari ST, BlackBerry, Commodore 64, MS-DOS, NES, Master System
- Release: 1988
- Genres: Sports, action
- Modes: Single-player, multiplayer

Speedball is a 1988 sports action video game developed by The Bitmap Brothers and published by Image Works. The game is based on a violent futuristic sport that draws on elements of handball and ice hockey, and rewards violent play as well as goals.

Speedball was released in November 1988 for the Amiga and Atari ST and later ported to MS-DOS, Commodore 64, and the Master System. SOFEL released a port for the NES in 1991, as KlashBall. It was re-released in 2004 as one of the 30 games on the C64 Direct-to-TV.

== Gameplay ==
The game is played by two teams on an enclosed court with a goal at each end, similar to that of ice hockey or five-a-side football. The court contains fixed bounce domes that modify the trajectory and speed of the ball, as well as one hole in the middle at each side where upon entering the ball will appear at the opposite side, keeping its momentum. The layout of the domes on the court changes as the player faces a different team, up to a maximum of 10 variations.

A player has control of only one outfield player on a team at any one time. The game may be played by one or two players; two player games are played competitively. Two game modes are supported: knockout (face increasingly tougher teams controlled by the computer in best of three matches) and league.

The game starts with the player(s) selecting a captain among three available choices, each starting with significantly more points than the other two in one of three stats: stamina, power and skill. All the members in a team start the game with the same stats. During the actual game, as team members hit opponents, the opponent loses a part of his stamina; when stamina drops low enough, that individual player will move slower than the rest. The more powerful a team member is, the more damage he will deliver with a direct hit. Extra skill on the other hand promotes aggression from any team member controlled by the computer towards the opposite team, and improves chances of a successful hit.

While in possession of the ball, the player can either press and immediately release the fire button to do a direct throw, or keep the button pressed to make the ball go higher. Players can then jump to try and catch it, but this makes them more vulnerable to being hit by the opposite team.

As the game progresses, coins and several power-ups appear randomly which can be collected. Power-ups include making the ball become electrified (the opposite team cannot pick it up and will be harmed if they try), and make it teleport to the player's team member. Coins can be traded at the end of each game for different bonuses, such as extra time or several enhancements for all members in the player's team, including a permanent increase to any of their stats. Computer-controlled players (either on the player or the computer's side) cannot collect coins, but the active player controlled by the computer can collect power-ups. The team that has amassed the most goals at the end of the game is the winner.

== Reception ==
Speedball received scores of 862 (MS-DOS) and 834 (Atari ST) out of 1000 from ACE, 79% from Mean Machines and 57% from Power Play. The game won the 1989 Golden Joystick Game Of The Year award. Computer Gaming World gave the game a positive review, praising its graphics and long-lasting gameplay. It was also voted Best 16-bit Game of the Year at the Golden Joystick Awards.

The game's Master System port was given a 90% by French magazine Joypad. The One magazine in 1991 rated the game five out of five stars for the Amiga, Atari ST and PC.

== Sequels ==
Speedball was succeeded by Speedball 2: Brutal Deluxe. Speedball 2 had a greater and more lasting popularity than Speedball, and has been remade and republished a number of times.

A modern re-imagining of the game is released by Rebellion Developments in 2026 for the Microsoft Windows, Playstation 5 and Xbox Series X|S.

== See also ==
- Deathrow
- HyperBlade
- Skateball (a.k.a. Skate Wars)
