= Minigame =

Game often contained within a video game

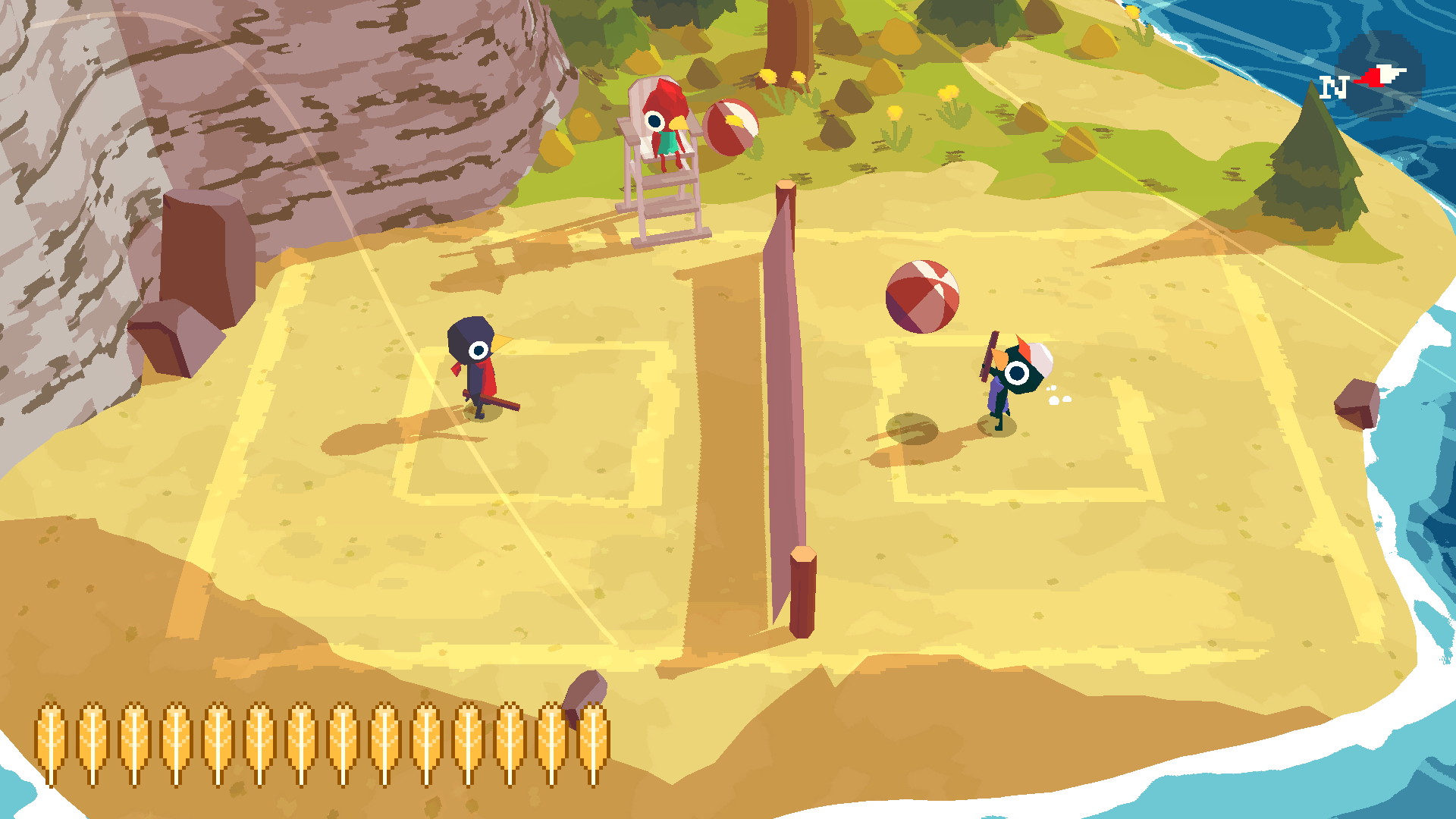
A "beachstickball" minigame in A Short Hike

A minigame (also spelled mini game and mini-game, sometimes called a subgame or microgame) is a short game often contained within another video game. A minigame contains different gameplay elements and is often smaller or more simplistic than the game in which it is contained.

Some video games consist entirely of minigames which tie into an overall theme, such as Olympic Decathlon (1980). Minigames can also be used to represent a specific experience, such as hacking and lock picking, both of which are found in Bethesda games, or scanning an area, that ties into a larger game.

== Minigame compilations ==
Some games are made up of many minigames strung together into one video game, such as Nintendo's WarioWare series (which are called microgames in the series), Universal Research Laboratories' Video Action (1974), David Whittaker's Lazy Jones and the mobile game Phone Story. Some similar games specifically developed for multiplayer are considered party games, such as the Itadaki Street series by Square Enix and Nintendo's Mario Party series. In party games, minigames usually involve performing an activity faster or collecting more of a specified item than other players to win; some may be entirely luck.

== Examples ==
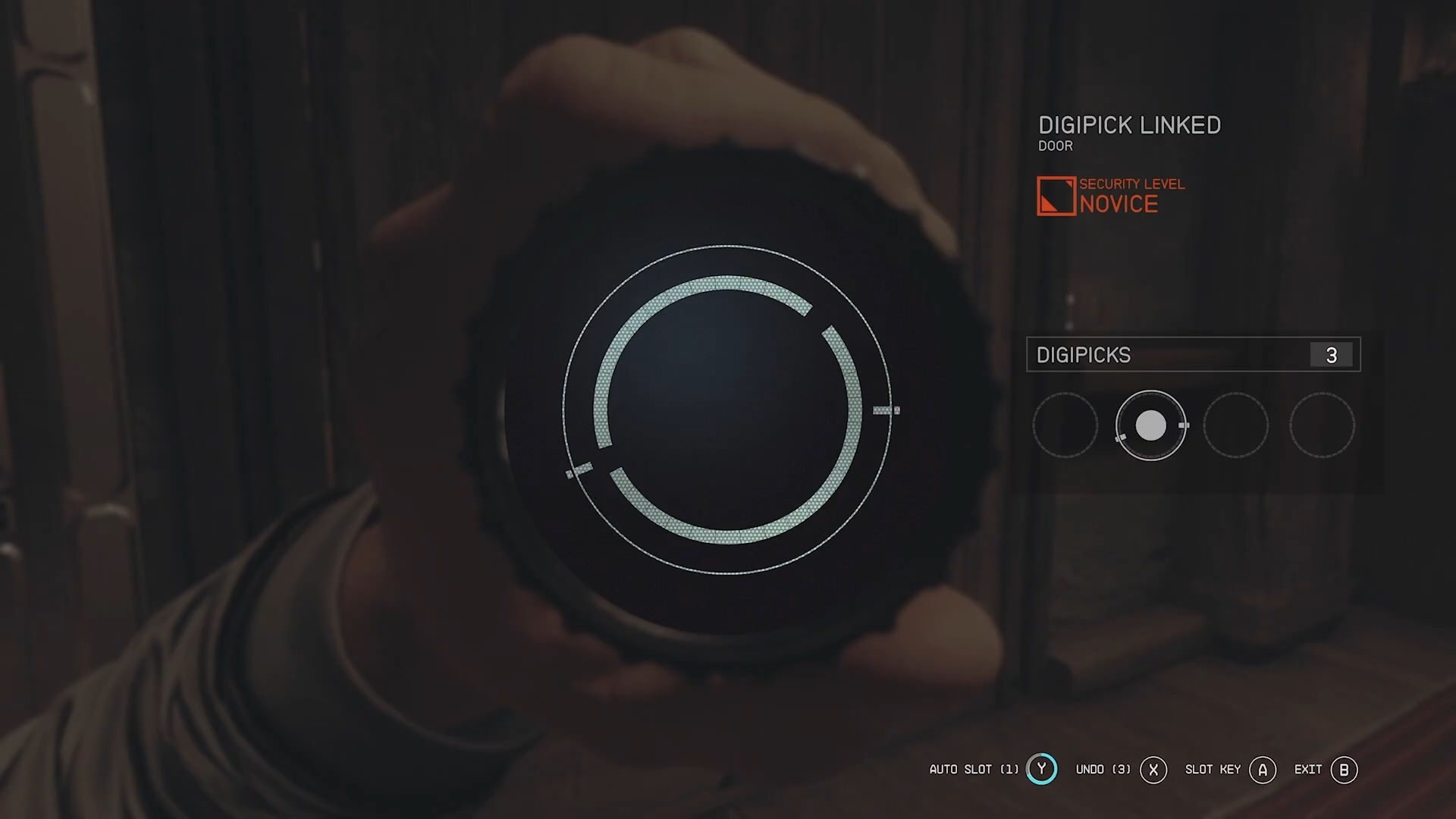
Lock picking minigame in Starfield

The Final Fantasy series includes minigames in every entry, since the first Final Fantasy (1987), in which a 15 puzzle in the form of an Easter egg can be uncovered by entering a specific sequence of inputs while piloting a ship. It was added into the game by programmer Nasir Gebelli despite it not being part of Squaresoft's original game design.

The PocketStation for PlayStation and VMU for Dreamcast accessories allowed the user to download minigames from the main console onto the pocket device, and often then sync progress in the minigame back on to the console. One example of this includes the Chocobo World minigame inside Final Fantasy VIII.

== See also ==
- Casual game
- Invade-a-Load
- Party video game
- Browser game
