= Amaurote =

1987 video game

- Developer: Binary Design Ltd
- Publisher: Mastertronic
- Designer: John Pickford
- Composer: David Whittaker
- Platforms: Amstrad CPC, Atari 8-bit, C64, MSX, ZX Spectrum, Electronika BK 0011M
- Release: 1987
- Genre: Action
- Mode: Single player

Amaurote is a British video game for 8-bit computer systems that was released in 1987 by Mastertronic on their Mastertronic Added Dimension label. The music for the game was written by David Whittaker.

== Plot ==
From the game's instructions:

The city of Amaurote has been invaded by huge, aggressive insects who have built colonies in each of the city's 25 sectors. As the only uninjured army officer left after the invasion (that'll teach you for hiding!) the job falls to you to destroy all the insect colonies.

== Gameplay ==
An insect chases the Arachnus (Atari 8-bit screenshot)

The player controls an "Arachnus 4", an armoured fighting-machine that moves on four legs. The player must first select a sector to play in via a map screen and then control the Arachnus as it wanders an isometric (top-down in the Commodore 64 version) view of the cityscape attacking marauding insects and searching for the insect queen using a scanner. The Arachnus attacks by launching bouncing bombs. It can only launch one at a time so if a bomb misses its intended target the player will have to wait until it hits the scenery or bounces against the fence of the play area before firing again. Once the queen has been located, the player can radio-in a "supa-bomb" which can be used to destroy the queen. The player can also radio-in other supplies such as additional bombs and even ask to be pulled out of the combat zone. Extra weaponry costs the player "dosh", the in-game currency.

== Reception ==
Reception

Award
Publication	Award
Crash	Smash

The game was favourably reviewed by Crash magazine who said it was graphically impressive, well designed and fun to play. It was given a 92% overall rating. Zzap!64 were less impressed by the Commodore 64 version which was criticised for dull gameplay and programming bugs. It was rated 39% overall.
