= Red Max =

1986 video game

- Developer: David Darling
- Publisher: Codemasters
- Composer: David Whittaker
- Platforms: Commodore 64, Atari 8-bit
- Release: 1986 (C64); 1987 (Atari)
- Genre: Action

Red Max is an action game developed by David Darling and published in 1986 for the Commodore 64 as one of Codemasters' launch titles. It was ported to Atari 8-bit computers the following year. This game closely resembles Darling's earlier work, The Last V8 and was originally intended to be published as The Last V8 2. The graphics were created by James Wilson, with music composed by David Whittaker.

== Plot ==
In a dystopian future where the Sun has unexpectedly begun a supernova cycle, the remnants of humanity, surviving a global war, face an urgent need to escape Earth. They colonize the Moon and engineer massive anti-gravity orbs to alter its orbit toward the Sun. As the Moon approaches the Sun, the orbs are used to propel it through the Solar System, aiming to enter a new planetary system to sustain human life.

The colonists' strategy includes entering hibernation for twelve hundred years, hoping to outlast the Sun's supernova event. When they believe they are safely past the Sun, an unforeseen threat arises. The Renegade Death Lords, a group of saboteurs, land on the Moon and disrupt the colony's power plants by planting fission mines. The player must swiftly deactivate these mines and awaken the crew from hibernation before the power outage leads to their permanent demise.

== Gameplay ==
Successfully defused a mine (Atari 8-bit)

The gameplay interface is divided into two primary sections. The top portion of the screen serves as the main play area, while the bottom section includes critical game information displays: a speedometer, tachometer, fuel gauge, and shield status indicator. The player can collect fuel during gameplay; however, shields are not replenishable and will diminish upon collision with obstacles. Losing all fuel or shields results in the loss of a life.

The main view is from above, centering the Red Max bike in the midst of the landscape, which scrolls as the bike moves. Acceleration is controlled by pressing the fire button, and releasing it engages the brakes. The bike can also be steered left or right. The objective is to navigate the lunar surface, deactivating flashing mines by driving over them. Successfully clearing the mines triggers an alarm, signaling the player to proceed to a lift that descends to the engineering level.

The mines are strategically placed in challenging locations, guarded by the Moon's automatic defense mechanisms. These defenses include laser fences that can be temporarily disabled by running over specific switches, persistent laser gates that cannot be turned off, and patches of slime that compromise steering and damage the bike's tires. These hazards gradually deplete the bike’s shields. Additionally, collisions with walls and buildings can result in total destruction of the bike.

Subsequent levels follow a similar gameplay structure but introduce more complex labyrinths of buildings and walls, increasing the difficulty of maneuvering the bike through the environment.

== Reception ==
Red Max was met with mostly positive reviews. A critic from Your Commodore magazine praised the game, highlighting its replay value by stating: "Red Max is yet another highly addictive budget game that drives you back for another game again, and again." Meanwhile, a reviewer from Atari User magazine also responded favorably, despite some reservations about the motorcycle console occupying the bottom two-thirds of the screen, which they felt contributed little to gameplay. Nevertheless, the reviewer concluded positively, noting, "Red Max is one of the best budget games I've seen"" and awarded it a score of 9 out of 10.

== Reviews ==
- Page 6 #47 (1990-12,01)
