= BraveStarr (video game) =

1987 video game

- Developer: Probe Software
- Publisher: U.S. Gold
- Composer: David Whittaker
- Platforms: ZX Spectrum; Amstrad CPC; Commodore 64
- Release: EU: 1987
- Genre: Action
- Mode: Single-player

BraveStarr is a 1987 action game developed by Probe Software and published under U.S. Gold's Go! label. Based on the animated series and toyline of the same name, the player assumes the role of Marshal BraveStarr.

== Gameplay ==
Marshall Bravestarr travels across Planet New Texas to rescue Shamen, who has been taken by Tex Hex under orders from the evil spirit Stampede. The player guides Bravestarr through locations such as Star Peak, the Prairie Mines, and Fort Kerium, collecting Kerium and using it to buy equipment. Along the way, Bravestarr fights enemies, avoids hazards, and searches for clues that lead toward Shamen's location. The game progresses by moving between these areas, gathering resources, and confronting the forces controlled by Tex Hex and Stampede.

== Development ==
BraveStarr was published by Probe Software and developed under US Gold's Go! label.

== Reception ==
Reception

Review scores
Publication	Score
Amstrad Action	39%
Crash	46%
Computer and Video Games	25/40
Sinclair User	5/10
Zzap!64	28%
Iver District Observer	69%

Award
Publication	Award
Your Sinclair	YS Megagame

BraveStarr received mixed reviews from video game critics. The music by David Whittaker was praised.
