= Chrono Quest =

1988 video game

- Cover art by Roger Dean
- Developer: Infomedia
- Publishers: 16/32 Diffusion; Psygnosis
- Director: Marc Fajal; Michel Centelles
- Composer: David Whittaker
- Platforms: Amiga, Atari ST
- Release: September 1988
- Genre: Adventure
- Mode: Single-player

Chrono Quest (Explora: Time Run in France) is an adventure game released in September 1988 for the Amiga and Atari ST. It was developed by French developer Infomedia and published by 16/32 Diffusion in France and Psygnosis in the United Kingdom. Chrono Quest is an historical adventure where the player (accused of murdering their father) travels to different time periods on a quest to find their father's true murderer. The box art was designed by Roger Dean.

== Gameplay ==
The player has just discovered the time machine. The interface shows item icons along the bottom row and action icons on the right side. (Atari ST)

Chrono Quest is a point-and-click adventure game that uses a mouse driven icon-based interface. The game begins in 1922 at a family estate in France, with the player character accused of murdering his father. Using a time-traveling machine hidden within the castle, the protagonist travels to several historical periods to search for clues and prove his innocence.

The player explores several distinct eras such as: upper Paleolithic era, New Kingdom of Egypt, Mexico during the decline of the Maya civilisation or India at the beginning of Jahangir's reign. Each location has unique characters, items, and challenges. Players interact with the environment via mouse driven commands like "pick-up", "examine" or "use". Clues and objects collected in one time zone may be essential in another.

The gameplay emphasizes item-based puzzles and deductive reasoning. Environmental dangers include aggressive animals, hostile humans, and deadly traps. Death is possible if players make incorrect choices or delay action in certain scenes.

== Development ==
Chrono Quest was developed by the French studio Infomedia. The game was programmed by Jean‑Marc Cazale (Amiga) and Herve Hubert (Atari ST), with scenario design by Patrick de Mozas and Fabien Begom. The detailed background graphics were drawn by Fabien Begom, with title screen artwork by Jeff Bramfitt. Music was composed by David Whittaker. The development team utilized custom scripting tools and bitmap editors to construct the game's varied historical settings.

Roger Dean was commissioned by Psygnosis to create the iconic cover art for the UK release. The game was showcased at various trade expos in 1988, generating anticipation for its ambitious visual presentation and time travel storyline. Although an IBM PC version was advertised in 1988, no release is known to have occurred, and it is generally believed the port was either cancelled or never completed.

== Reception ==
Chrono Quest received a mixed reception from critics. Most reviewers praised the quality of the graphics and artwork, often singling out its painterly backdrops and moody atmosphere. The Games Machine gave it a score of 86%, highlighting the compelling plot and impressive visuals.

However, the game's pacing and puzzle design received criticism. Commodore User noted that the game's early stages were slow and required considerable trial and error. ACE (Advanced Computer Entertainment) gave the game 221 out of 400, calling the icons unintuitive and the logic inconsistent.

ZZAP!64 praised the game's atmospheric graphics and ambitious scope, describing it as "great fun and extremely compelling" despite awkward mouse control and translation issues. The magazine highlighted the variety in time eras, the challenging puzzles, and the visual presentation, awarding the game an overall score of 78%.

== Legacy ==
A sequel to the game, Chrono Quest 2, was released in 1989. Explora III: Sous le signe du serpent was never released in English, but saw a French release in 1990. Chrono Quest 2 had a similar critical reception.
