= Beyond the Ice Palace =

1988 video game

- Publisher: Elite Systems
- Programmers: Tim Moore (Amiga, ST); David Perry (CPC); Nick Jones (C64); Ian Upton (Spectrum)
- Artists: Nigel Brownjohn (Amiga, C64, ST, Spectrum); Nick Bruty (CPC)
- Composer: David Whittaker
- Platforms: Amiga, Amstrad CPC, Atari ST, Commodore 64, ZX Spectrum
- Release: 1988
- Genre: Platform
- Mode: Single-player

Beyond the Ice Palace is a platform game published by Elite Systems in 1988 for the Amiga, Amstrad CPC, Atari ST, Commodore 64, and ZX Spectrum.

== Gameplay ==
The game is a 2D scrolling platformer. The player must complete his mission by fighting through three levels of monsters. There are some similarities to Ghosts 'n Goblins, such as the ability to pick up different weapons. The player also has two Spirits of the Forest (circular faces) which may be summoned to attack enemies in difficult battles. More spirits may be collected along the way.

== Plot ==
A mystical land is caught up in a battle between good and evil, as dark spirits sent by an evil witch are destroying the forests. In desperation, the ancient and wise spirits of the woods shoot a sacred arrow into the air. Whoever finds it will be able to defeat the powers of darkness and destroy the witch.

== Reception ==
Sinclair User described Beyond the Ice Palace as "not a classic in any sense, but certainly good enough to occupy you until the NBT (Next Big Thing) comes along." According to Your Sinclair, it was "all in all a rather super little game." Crash gave this "slick, playable and extremely compelling arcade adventure" a review score of 83%.

In a retrospective review of the Amstrad version for Retro Gamer, Gavin Eke noted the game's similarly to Ghosts 'n Goblins. Eke was impressed by the "colourful & smooth" graphics and considered the game to be worth a look for fans of its inspiration. It was said to be a "flattering tribute". Gavin Miller reviewed the Atari ST release for the same publication. He said that although short, consisting of only 3 levels, it did offer a challenge. Miller concluded: "Overall a great little game with some good music. Would have liked a few more levels though."

== Sequel ==
A sequel, Beyond the Ice Palace II, was announced in April 2024 and released on March 10, 2025. It was developed by Storybird Studio for Windows, Nintendo Switch, PlayStation 4, PlayStation 5, Xbox One, and Xbox Series X/S.
