= BraveStarr =

US 1987–1988 animated TV series

- Title card
- Genre: Space Western; Action-adventure; Science fiction
- Voices of: Pat Fraley; Charlie Adler; Erika Scheimer; Lou Scheimer; Alan Oppenheimer; Susan Blu; Ed Gilbert
- Country of origin: United States
- Original language: English
- No. of series: 1
- No. of episodes: 65

Production
- Executive producer: Lou Scheimer
- Running time: 25 minutes
- Production company: Filmation

Original release
- Network: Syndication
- Release: September 14, 1987 – February 24, 1988

BraveStarr is an American space Western animated television series that aired 65 episodes from September 1987 to February 1988 in syndication. The show was broadcast a year after Mattel had released a line of Bravestarr action figures. BraveStarr was the last animated series produced by Filmation and Group W Productions before Filmation shut down in 1989. The show was not a success when it first aired, but has since gained a small cult following due to its mix of Western and science fiction elements.

== Background ==
The idea for BraveStarr began with Tex Hex, his chief adversary. Tex Hex was created by Filmation's staff artists in 1984, during the development of Filmation's Ghostbusters. Lou Scheimer found the character fascinating and pulled Tex Hex from the Ghostbusters cast. He asked Arthur Nadel, Filmation's vice president for creative affairs, and art director John Grusd to develop a science-fiction Western around the character.

Scheimer also believed Native Americans had been either ignored or unfairly stereotyped by American children's television shows, so he wished to create a show with a Native American hero. Scheimer was an admirer of the science fiction novel The Beast Master by Andre Norton, about a Navajo warrior on an alien planet. The Filmation staff thus created the character of Marshal Bravestarr, a futuristic "Western lawman" from a Native American culture, as the show's protagonist. Animation historian Hal Erickson has noted that "Bravestarr" was one of the few American animated series to have a Native American protagonist.

Filmation approached Mattel to create a line of toys based on "Bravestarr", in exchange for creating a TV series to promote the toys. Mattel agreed to this arrangement. As the concepts took shape, staff writer Bob Forward fleshed out the writer's guide and eventually co-wrote the feature film script for BraveStarr: The Legend with writer Steve Hayes. The series cost $20 million.

== Plot ==
It is set in the 23rd century on a multi-cultural desert planet called New Texas.

As on other Filmation series (He-Man and the Masters of the Universe, She-Ra: Princess of Power, Shazam!, The Secrets of Isis, and the animated Ghostbusters), a moral lesson is told at the end of each episode. One notable episode is "The Price", in which a boy buys a drug called "Spin", becomes addicted to it, and dies of an overdose. Another episode, "Sunrise, Sunset", depicts a character's wife giving birth and his elderly father passing away - events that most other 1980s Saturday-morning cartoons did not depict.

== Setting ==
The setting in most episodes is New Texas: a planetary system orbiting three suns, 600 parsecs (2,000 light-years) from Earth. Much of the food and water supply is imported. The majority of land is desert or prairie but there is one wetland area, which is the home of "apecats". Water is also found in cactus-like 'Aqua-Pod' plants.

The chief export is Kerium, a red mineral used as a fuel source, and often therefore the prize of conflicts among characters. Implications exist that New Texas was colonized for Kerium, but will remain inhabited even after the mines are exhausted. The native civilization of New Texas are the Prairie People, who operate most of the Kerium mines.

=== Points of interest ===
The following locations are on New Texas:

- Fort Kerium – A mechanized town capable of armoring itself; BraveStarr's base of operation.
- Starr Peak – A mountain where Shaman lives, concealing the spacecraft in which he arrived on New Texas, atop a Kerium deposit.
- Stone Canyon – A large mining canyon. Also the location of some crime.
- Peaceful Valley – A large agrarian land.
- The Hexagon – Fortress for most of the villains.
- The Badlands – The inhospitable land surrounding the Hexagon.

Two episodes are set on Earth, where the city of London resembles a modernized Victorian England, including a time-traveling Sherlock Holmes.

=== Alien and human species ===
- Apecats – Gigantic non-humanoid felines who live near the only wetlands on New Texas.
- Avianoid – The two-headed criminal Two Face comes from an avianoid species, and had half of his body augmented with cybernetic replacements (for reasons unknown), making him a cyborg. Another avianoid is the 'Cygnian Ambassador', who resembles an ostrich.
- Broncosaurs – A dinosaur-like civilization of which Stampede is the last living representative.
- Dingos (a.k.a. Coyotoids) – Coyote-like humanoids, who often appear as minor antagonists, amenable to a peaceful lifestyle.
- Equestroids – Cyborg equines capable of assuming human attributes (bipedal stance and prehensile forelimbs especially) at will. Thirty/Thirty is the only survivor of this colony.
- Fuufta – Pacifist sheep-like creatures, often targeted by enemy civilizations.
- Humans – A variety of ethnic groups including Native Americans BraveStarr and Shaman, and the British Sherlock Holmes.
- Krang – Cat-like humanoids; warlike and therefore opposed to BraveStarr and his ideals.
- Porcinoid – Hawgtie comes from a porcine (pig-like) humanoid species.
- Prairie People – Anthropoid prairie dog-like creatures and native to New Texas who take pleasure in mining and in the operation of machines.
- Reptilianoid – Vipra and Diamondback are both reptilian and humanoid, and display behaviors of both.
- Rigellian – Drink-seller Handlebar is a member of this race of green-skinned humanoids with bright orange hair and superhuman strength. Dr. Wt'sn is also of this species.
- Sand Walrus – Antagonist Sand Storm comes from this red-skinned humanoid species and has a number of special powers.
- Solacows – A non-sentient cattle-like species, the raising of which is one of the few major non-mining-related industries on New Texas; disputes between Solacow ranchers and Kerium miners are not uncommon and have on occasion resulted in physical altercations.

== Characters ==
=== Heroes ===
BraveStarr and his sidekick/mount Thirty/Thirty

- Marshal BraveStarr (voiced by Pat Fraley) – The title character and galactic marshal of New Texas; a Native American who can call upon the power of "spirit animals", enabling him briefly to perform superhuman feats. The Eyes of the Hawk enhances his vision and can also grant him an aerial view of the adjacent area. The Ears of the Wolf gives him superhuman hearing. The Strength of the Bear gives him superhuman strength. The Speed of the Puma gives him superhuman speed. The Strength of the Bear grants BraveStarr strength sufficient to destroy stone or support steel bridges, whereas the Speed of the Puma allows him speeds akin to comic-book characters Quicksilver and the Flash. In addition to his animal powers, he has electronic equipment such as a computerized visor and a two-way radio. BraveStarr also carries a "Neutra-laser" pistol, a high-tech tomahawk, a beam lasso and a "Trans-freezer" rifle, and the badge on his shirt can shield him at need. Although called "Protector of Peace" and "Champion of Justice", he usually acts in the former role, preferring to serve as a mediator in any conflict. He often seeks peaceful resolution to every problem, unless confronted by the series' periodic villains.
- Thirty/Thirty (voiced by Ed Gilbert) – BraveStarr's Equestroid and chief deputy, capable of assuming a bipedal form at will. BraveStarr affectionately calls him "big partner". His principal weapon is "Sara Jane": a large blunderbuss from which he projects directed energy. He is more belligerent than BraveStarr, and will often prefer fights to resolutions.
- Deputy Fuzz (voiced by Charlie Adler) – A member of the Prairie People and BraveStarr's other trusted deputy. BraveStarr affectionately calls him "li'l partner". Fuzz is typically a figure of comic relief, but also plays more-serious roles at need. The first of the Prairie People to befriend humans, and the only Prairie Person to take up a job in law enforcement.
- Judge J.B. McBride (voiced by Susan Blu) – Fort Kerium's principal (and perhaps only) judge and lawyer, BraveStarr's ally, consultant, and occasional paramour. In battle, she uses an electronic gavel (called a "hammer of justice" in the series) given to her by the Prairie People.
- Shaman (voiced by Ed Gilbert) – An otherwise-unnamed mystic, capable of teleportation, time travel, psychokinesis, and near-omniscient clairvoyance. He is BraveStarr's mentor and foster father. BraveStarr would often telepathically contact Shaman for advice on how to handle certain situations. He is the source/teacher of Bravestarr's four animal-related powers.

=== Supporting characters ===
- Altran (voiced by Alan Oppenheimer) – A human boy from a mining village on the other side of the Iron Mountains.
- Angus McBride (voiced by Ed Gilbert) – The father of Judge J. B. McBride. He is a former Kerium prospector who now operates Fort Kerium's newspaper.
- Billy-Bob (voiced by Ed Gilbert) – A human Kerium prospector.
- Borka (voiced by Alan Oppenheimer) – A settler who briefly became a vigilante to defeat Tex Hex once and for all.
- Commander Karen Kane (voiced by Susan Blu) – A former Star Marine who retired after marrying Angus McBride. She is the stepmother of J. B. Like Angus, she has a Scottish accent.
- Diamondback (voiced by Alan Oppenheimer) – A Reptilianoid Kerium prospector, who owns the Kerium deposit underneath Starr Peak along with his human colleague Billy-Bob.
- Doc Clayton (voiced by Lou Scheimer) – The town's doctor who is frequently an ally of BraveStarr's.
- Handlebar (voiced by Alan Oppenheimer) – A Rigellian bartender and former space pirate from the Rigel star system, with a bright orange handlebar mustache and a Brooklyn accent. He mostly serves BraveStarr and Thirty/Thirty a drink called "sweetwater". Other times he acts as a reserve law enforcement officer. He has a pet cyborg steer named Rampage.
- Iron Arm (voiced by Pat Fraley and Lou Scheimer) – The owner of the town's repair station. He is of an unknown alien species.
- Long Arm John (voiced by Ed Gilbert) – A law enforcement officer with a sophisticated prosthetic arm.
- Mayor Derringer (voiced by Pat Fraley) – The town leader of Fort Kerium who occasionally aides BraveStarr. Although he rarely uses it, he carries a stun pistol for protection.
- Molly (voiced by Susan Blu) – Courier aboard a "Strato-Stage", a mechanized stagecoach traveling above ground. Occasionally, Molly has a security guard to blast away enemies. Molly is also capable of piloting space vehicles.
- Togg Salter (voiced by Pat Fraley in "Tunnel of Terror", Lou Scheimer in "Tex But No Hex") – A prospector and former scientist from the planet Ammitus. He received a Meritus Ecological award for saving green forest and had no criminal record. He is married and has one child, a son.
- Wild Child (voiced by Erika Scheimer) – A baby who wandered into the desert and was adopted by dingoes. He grew up among them until he met BraveStarr and Judge J.B. McBride.
- Zarko (voiced by Charlie Adler in "Wild Child", Ed Gilbert in "Call of the Wild") – The last living member of the Old Ones who hunted anyone that trespassed into the Lost City. After he helped save Wild Child, Zarko gives up hunting and adopts Wild Child.
- Orville (voiced by Susan Blu) – A new arrival to New Texas and Fort Kerium singled out for his stutter. He was kidnapped by thieves Craver and Grumble, during which he befriended Grumble and convinced him to turn on Craver.
- Brad (voiced by Susan Blu) – One of Fort Kerium local school kids who was a close friend to Jay Olman and who turned in Dealer after Jay died.
- Sherlock Holmes (voiced by Pat Fraley) – The famous detective who was brought to the 23rd century through a rift in the space-time continuum. The continuum also gave him the power to blast lightning bolts, much like Tex Hex.
- Dr. Wt'sn (voiced by Peter Cullen) – A Rigellian detective in New London and future counterpart to Dr. Watson.
- Mycroft Holmes (voiced by Mary McDonald-Lewis) – A female agent of Scotland Yard and descendant of Sherlock Holmes, named after his brother.
- Kitty Lestrade (voiced by Mary McDonald-Lewis) – Chief Inspector of Scotland Yard, based on Inspector Lestrade.

=== Villains ===
- Carrion Bunch – An outlaw gang that reside in the Badlands at the Hexagon.
  - Tex Hex (voiced by Charlie Adler) – BraveStarr's rival, opponent and counterpart, distinguished by a withered appearance and lavender skin. He is Stampede's junior partner. Tex Hex was originally Tex, a greedy Kerium prospector who briefly co-owned a Kerium mine with Angus. He crashed a Kerium-overloaded ship while heading home from New Texas and was revived and given a host of magical powers by Stampede. Credited, in the feature film, with the discovery of Kerium on New Texas.
  - Outlaw Skuzz (voiced by Alan Oppenheimer) – Tex's cigar-smoking henchman. A cousin of Deputy Fuzz; apparently the only Prairie Person to practice crime. The moral lesson at the end of one episode had him saying the one bad thing he disliked doing was smoking and warning viewers not to follow his example.
  - Cactus Head (voiced by Pat Fraley) – A short robot with a cactus-shaped headpiece equipped with two energy cannons. Often seen as the comic relief and used as a spy.
  - Sand Storm (voiced by Ed Gilbert) – A red Sandsnake-like creature who can exhale giant clouds of sand. His kind are sometimes called "sand walruses" and are native to New Texas. He can also use his sand to put people to sleep or create sand creatures.
  - Thunder Stick (voiced by Pat Fraley) – A stuttering robot with a directed-energy cannon built into his arm.
  - Vipra (voiced by Susan Blu) – A Reptilianoid female villain who has the power to hypnotize people. She is the assistant to Tex Hex, but envious of his high rank among the villains.
- Stampede (voiced by Alan Oppenheimer) – Chief antagonist and ringleader of the outlaws based at the Hexagon. A monstrous, partly skeletal Broncosaur and apparently the last of his kind. He seldom appears in battle directly, but is usually the source of his subordinates' evil plans. Stampede is the archenemy of BraveStarr's mentor Shaman.
- Billy the Droid – A purple robot with the power to shoot energy bolts from his hands and a gripping arm from his chest.
- Dealer – A dingo drug dealer who was selling a drug called Spin that later killed a boy named Jay Olman. After his plot was foiled by testimony from Brad, Dealer was arrested by BraveStarr.
- "Two Faced" Dingo Dan (voiced by Ed Gilbert) – One of Tex's dingoes with a notionally Australian accent. Dan has the ability to take on a human appearance, but would often forget to change his distinctive "fancy hat". He also leads his own gang of Rustlers and is a member of the Dune Buggy Gang.
- Dune Buggy Gang – A gang residing in the Badlands that causes trouble for travelers.
  - Ryder (voiced by Alan Oppenheimer) – A cyborg human who is the leader of the Dune Buggy Gang.
  - Slither (voiced by Charlie Adler) – A Reptilianoid.
- Hawgtie (voiced by Lou Scheimer) – A humanoid pig dressed in a Union Army uniform. He seemed to be strong, and used bolas to capture or bind his victims.
- Jingles Morgan (voiced by Ed Gilbert) – A former teacher of BraveStarr who hated to lose so much that he went rogue after fatally shooting his opponent Imperial Guard Trooper Salaman Bliss for mocking Morgan during a humiliating defeat.
- Krang – Humanoid felines with green Japanese armor and German accents; a periodic enemy.
- Leaper Riders – A group of dingoes that ride Leapers.
  - Goldtooth (voiced by Charlie Adler, Lou Scheimer in "Wild Child") – An overweight coyote that usually leads other dingoes in battle.
  - Barker (voiced by Lou Scheimer) – A little dingo.
  - Howler (voiced by Lou Scheimer) – Another coyote. He can assume human form.
- Moribund (voiced by Ed Gilbert) – An outlaw with a Russian accent who was briefly hired by Stampede to replace Tex Hex. He later escaped prison and returned to New Texas with Dingo Dan to find treasure, but was again defeated by BraveStarr.
- Professor Moriarty (voiced by Jonathan Harris) – A criminal mastermind and archenemy of Sherlock Holmes. He constructed a suspended animation chamber which allowed him to survive into the 23rd century, where he plotted world conquest.
- Rustlers – An outlaw gang led by Dingo Dan.
  - Weasel (voiced by Charlie Adler) – A dingo.
  - Mick (voiced by Alan Oppenheimer) – An alien.
  - Buster (voiced by Pat Fraley) – A robot.
- Queen Singlish (voiced by Susan Blu) – A woman that commandeered an entire island, which floats through space. She constantly wants slaves to assist her, but is defeated by the Prairie People.
- Slug Moody (voiced by Alan Oppenheimer) – A Rigellian outlaw who seeks revenge on two aliens for sending him to prison.
- Thoren (voiced by Alan Oppenheimer) – An alien slaver dressed like a sultan who employs Tex Hex to bring him slaves and betrays him.
- Two-Face (voiced by Charlie Adler and Alan Oppenheimer) – A cyborg Avianoid with a normal head and a cyborg head.
- Brian (voiced by Pat Fraley) – One of Fort Kerium local school kids nicknamed "Gappie" who is friends with Judy and Clorg and who regularly teases new students such as Wild Child.
- Craver – (voiced by Charlie Adler) – A mutant dingo with the power to fly, he used Grumble to rob miners. He was captured by BraveStarr after Grumble finally realized his "friend" was using him.
- Grumble – (voiced by Lou Scheimer) – A slow-witted but superhumanly strong being who was Craver's partner until a boy they captured called Orville convinced him he was being used by Craver.
- Bart (voiced by Alan Oppenheimer) – A former outlaw who robbed Stratostages with his younger brother Billy. He grew tired of being a criminal and tried to convince Billy to change his ways, but eventually turned him in to BraveStarr.
- Billy (voiced by Charlie Adler) – The leader of an outlaw gang that included his older brother Bart and some dingoes. He robbed several Stratostages along with them and later stole a medicine as ransom, but BraveStarr recovered it and arrested him with help from Bart.

== Episodes ==
| No. | Title | Directed by | Written by | Original release date | Prod. code |
|---|---|---|---|---|---|
| 1 | "The Disappearance of Thirty-Thirty" | Lou Kachivas; Tom Tataranowicz | Don Heckman; Bob Forward | September 14, 1987 | 053 |
After an argument with BraveStarr over the use of Sara Jane, Thirty/Thirty goes to the Equestroid Temple and travels to the past before he met BraveStarr. BraveStarr and Thirty/Thirty tell viewers even the best of friends may disagree, but fighting is not the right solution.
| 2 | "Fallen Idol" | Ernie Schmidt | Bob Forward | September 15, 1987 | 037 |
BraveStarr is horrified to learn that his hero and former mentor, Jingles Morgan, is now a wanted murderer and must apprehend him. BraveStarr tells viewers immoral behavior must not be copied regardless of who does it and there are plenty of good role models out there.
| 3 | "The Taking of Thistledown 123" | Ernie Schmidt | Bob Forward | September 16, 1987 | 007 |
Tex Hex captures a space freighter for its kerium cargo and takes Mayor Derringer and an ambassador hostage. BraveStarr tells viewers teamwork is important, as often a job may be too big or dangerous for only one person to do.
| 4 | "Skuzz and Fuzz" | Bill Reed | Don Heckman | September 17, 1987 | 021 |
Skuzz breaks into the Prairie People kingdom to steal a batch of kerium for Tex Hex. After Skuzz sets off the self-destruct mechanism of the kerium's force dome and an accidental blast of kerium binds him and Fuzz together, the two are forced to cooperate as BraveStarr tries to prevent the destruction of the kingdom. BraveStarr and Fuzz tell viewers there may be a little good in even the worst of people.
| 5 | "A Day in the Life of a New Texas Judge" | Ernie Schmidt | Bob Forward | September 18, 1987 | 048 |
Dogmatic judge Twangli checks up on J.B. on behalf of the galactic Court of Justice. Her overzealousness puts J.B. and BraveStarr at risk of losing their jobs, just as a conflict is brewing between ranchers and miners. J.B. tells viewers teamwork is important, as it often helps people solve problems which they otherwise would not be able to solve themselves.
| 6 | "Rampage" | Marsh Lamore | Bob Forward | September 21, 1987 | 041 |
While helping a young man named Altran rescue his people from Sand Storm, BraveStarr is unable to alert Thirty/Thirty. Believing his partner has been captured by Tex Hex, Thirty/Thirty goes berserk as he looks for BraveStarr. BraveStarr tells viewers it is very important to let their parents know where they will be whenever they are going to a place.
| 7 | "To Walk a Mile" | Richard Trueblood | J. Larry Carroll | September 22, 1987 | 020 |
Lucas Conway has abandoned the use of guns ever since he caused an accident. But when his son Mark is kidnapped by Two-Face, Lucas must pick up his gun again to save him with BraveStarr. BraveStarr tells viewers sometimes they have to walk a mile in another person's shoes to understand them better.
| 8 | "Big Thirty and Little Wimble" | Marsh Lamore | John Shirley | September 23, 1987 | 038 |
Thirty/Thirty becomes the temporary foster father of young Prairie Person Wimble and enrolls him in a school as BraveStarr doubts his abilities to take care of Wimble. A Dingo named Howler wants to kidnap Wimble and attacks the class to set a trap for BraveStarr.
| 9 | "BraveStarr and the Law" | Richard Trueblood | Denis Higgins | September 24, 1987 | 010 |
Tex Hex decides to legally claim Starr Peak for its rich source of kerium and evict the Shaman from his home. BraveStarr and J.B. tell viewers the law must be respected even if one does not agree with it and there are legal ways to change a law.
| 10 | "Kerium Fever" | Ed Friedman | Dennis O'Flaherty | September 25, 1987 | 006 |
Human prospectors become jealous of the Prairie People due to their accessibility of kerium. Taking advantage of the conflict, Tex Hex frames the Prairie People for kidnapping J.B. McBride to instigate war between the two parties. Shaman tells viewers to accept responsibility if they do something wrong, instead of blaming others.
| 11 | "Memories" | Lou Kachivas | Bob Forward | September 28, 1987 | 039 |
The Krang arrive on New Texas and capture Angus. BraveStarr and J.B. team up with Commander Kane, whom Angus has known for a long time. BraveStarr, J.B. and Thirty/Thirty tell viewers being afraid of something may make it seem scarier than it really is and is nothing to be ashamed of.
| 12 | "Eyewitness" | Bill Nunes | Eric Orner | September 29, 1987 | 014 |
Two alien schoolboys wish to join the Carrion Bunch. Tex Hex uses them in a plot to capture the Shaman. Thirty/Thirty and BraveStarr tell viewers crime does not pay.
| 13 | "The Vigilantes" | Bill Reed | Harvey Brenner | September 30, 1987 | 023 |
Borka takes the law into his own hands and rallies the town against Tex Hex. BraveStarr tells viewers to respect the law for the good of everybody.
| 14 | "Wild Child" | Bill Nunes | Dennis O'Flaherty | October 1, 1987 | 027 |
While venturing into the Badlands in search of a wild boy who was raised by Dingoes, BraveStarr, Thirty/Thirty and J.B. find him as well as the Lost City, where Zarko seeks to hunt them. BraveStarr tells viewers love is the best way to solve problems and includes willingness to talk to the other person and listen to their side.
| 15 | "Hail, Hail, the Gang's All Here" | Bill Reed | Dennis O'Flaherty | October 2, 1987 | 018 |
When the Space Pirates arrive on New Texas to exact revenge on Handlebar, a former comrade, he must help BraveStarr stop them. BraveStarr and Thirty/Thirty tell viewers trust is about believing in somebody and is one of the best parts about human nature.
| 16 | "Eye of the Beholder" | Tom Sito | Tom Tataranowicz; Michael Stevens | October 5, 1987 | 011 |
Blind woman Ally Kingston comes to New Texas for a shipment of kerium which she plans to make blind children see again. While trying to steal the kerium, Tex Hex shows a soft side when she reminds him of his love from the past. J.B. and BraveStarr tell viewers blindness does not mean a person is incapable of a job and there are some jobs which blind people can do better than people with sight.
| 17 | "The Wrong Hands" | Bill Reed | John Shirley | October 6, 1987 | 025 |
The Krang create a powerful laser cannon for them to take over the galaxy, starting from New Texas. BraveStarr tells viewers power must be used carefully and for the good of everyone.
| 18 | "An Older Hand" | Richard Trueblood | J. Larry Carroll | October 7, 1987 | 030 |
Skuzz has taken over Fuzz's uncle Mern's village as the High Wizard and as a result Fort Kerium's supply of X-kerium is running short. BraveStarr tells viewers old and young people can be successful when they work together.
| 19 | "Showdown at Sawtooth" | Marsh Lamore | Charles Kaufman; Mark Nasiter | October 8, 1987 | 009 |
Tex Hex provokes unrest among the miners and demands the population of Sawtooth to leave. The miners must gather the courage to fight back, as BraveStarr challenges him to a duel. BraveStarr tells viewers even when they are frightened, if they reach deep down inside themselves they will still find courage.
| 20 | "Unsung Hero" | Ed Friedman | Bob Forward | October 12, 1987 | 029 |
Impressed by BraveStarr's heroics, the son of a pod farmer is disappointed his father is not a fighter. When Thirty/Thirty is captured by Dingoes, BraveStarr sends the farmer to rescue him and must help the son learn the true meaning of being a hero. BraveStarr tells viewers there are many types of heroes, including ones who fight for law and order and to keep everyone safe as well as ones who work hard to make life better for everyone.
| 21 | "Lost Mountain" | Lou Kachivas | Don Heckman | October 13, 1987 | 034 |
During a reconnaissance mission, BraveStarr and Fuzz lose control of their shuttle due to a magnetic field and crash-land on Lost Mountain. While BraveStarr takes care of an injured Fuzz, Tex Hex learns about the crash and sets off to capture him. BraveStarr tells viewers everyone should know what to do in an emergency.
| 22 | "Trouble Wears a Badge" | Richard Trueblood | John Shirley | October 15, 1987 | 043 |
BraveStarr must supervise the internship of recently-graduated Marshal Carson, whose arrogance and irrational hatred of non-humans creates a near-catastrophe when an alien spacecraft lands near Fort Kerium. BraveStarr tells viewers people should not be judged by their appearances or differences in culture.
| 23 | "Who Am I?" | Tom Sito | Martha Moran | October 16, 1987 | 022 |
Vipra steals the Lost Book of the Ancients, and overthrows Tex Hex and blocks BraveStarr's memory using its evil magic. BraveStarr tells viewers love and friendship are stronger than almost anything.
| 24 | "BraveStarr and the Treaty" | Bill Nunes | Shirley Hartman | October 20, 1987 | 033 |
The intergalactic senate decides to have a spaceship base built on New Texas, giving Tex Hex the chance to steal a battleship so he could take over the planet. BraveStarr and Shaman tell viewers it is all right to want something, but greed may lead a person to act unwisely.
| 25 | "Thoren the Slavemaster" | Tom Sito | Steven Zak | October 21, 1987 | 019 |
Thoren, an alien slaver, enlists the aid of Tex Hex to capture the Prairie People for him in return for a powerful weapon. But when he double crosses Tex, BraveStarr and Tex Hex must join forces to defeat him. BraveStarr tells viewers what goes around often comes around.
| 26 | "The Price" | Marsh Lamore | Bob Forward | October 22, 1987 | 049 |
BraveStarr and Thirty/Thirty must stop a peddler that is selling a drug called Spin in New Texas. Among those addicted is a young boy, whose best friend wants to help but has also promised not to tell. BraveStarr tells viewers to not mess with drugs as they are dangerous and can kill.
| 27 | "Revolt of the Prairie People" | Ed Friedman | Don Heckman | October 23, 1987 | 047 |
The Galaxy Council decides to establish a force field around the territory of the Prairie People to protect them. Seeing this as a threat to their freedom, the Prairie People start a rebellion against the council. BraveStarr tells viewers to stick up for what they know is right.
| 28 | "Hostage" | Ed Friedman | Egidio Dal Chele | October 26, 1987 | 031 |
Shaman is seriously ill and is kidnapped by Tex Hex while healing, who uses him to extort from BraveStarr. J.B. must rescue Shaman. BraveStarr tells viewers promises are meant to be kept.
| 29 | "Tunnel of Terror" | Ernie Schmidt | Steven J. Fisher | October 27, 1987 | 042 |
An old miner named Digger Knox discovers a load of kerium in his mine and shows it to BraveStarr and J.B. However, a poor and desperate miner named Togg Salter tries to steal some, accidentally trapping them in a cave-in as a result. BraveStarr, Thirty/Thirty and J.B. tell viewers stealing is wrong, regardless of the reason.
| 30 | "The Good, the Bad, and the Clumsy" | Lou Kachivas | Robby London | October 28, 1987 | 026 |
Billy the Droid and his gang rob the Fort Kerium bank and manage to escape due to Fuzz's clumsiness. Losing his confidence, Fuzz sets out to prove himself by capturing Billy the Droid, but backfires. BraveStarr and Thirty/Thirty must rescue Fuzz and help him regain his confidence. BraveStarr tells viewers making a mistake is the best way to learn from it.
| 31 | "Balance of Power" | Bill Nunes | John Shirley | October 29, 1987 | 052 |
With help from Skuzz and Thunder Stick, Stampede steals Shaman's staff and uses it to create a monster to attack Fort Kerium. BraveStarr and Thirty/Thirty must retrieve the staff before Fort Kerium is destroyed. BraveStarr tells viewers everybody makes mistakes, but learning from them will benefit one in the end.
| 32 | "Call to Arms" | Ernie Schmidt | Bob Forward | October 30, 1987 | 051 |
The Krang take Shaman prisoner and demand a huge ransom of kerium. BraveStarr, J.B. and Thirty/Thirty tell viewers no one should inappropriately touch their body and to tell a trusted adult if they have been touched in such a way.
| 33 | "BraveStarr and the Three Suns" | Richard Trueblood | Shirley Hartman | November 2, 1987 | 044 |
Stampede dismisses Tex Hex for his failures and calls in Moribund, who removes two of the three New Texas suns using a magic arrow created by Stampede to drive out the citizens of the planet. BraveStarr, J.B. and Thirty/Thirty tell viewers to appreciate the good things in their life instead of complaining about them.
| 34 | "The Witnesses" | Bill Reed | Michael Utvich | November 3, 1987 | 024 |
BraveStarr must protect two alien stowaways from a space outlaw looking for them. BraveStarr and Thirty/Thirty tell viewers size does not determine one's courage.
| 35 | "Handlebar and Rampage" | Tom Sito | Bob Forward | November 4, 1987 | 035 |
The Krang invade New Texas to take villagers as slaves. Meanwhile, Handlebar meets a mechanical bull named Rampage. Handlebar tells viewers kindness helps people make friends.
| 36 | "Runaway Planet" | Marsh Lamore | Rowby Goren | November 5, 1987 | 032 |
A planet has broken away from its planetary system and is about to crash into New Texas. BraveStarr and Doc Clayton must save the life forms on the planet and destroy it with a Magnamite bomb on time. Doc Clayton tells viewers the life of any living thing is important.
| 37 | "The Bounty Hunter" | Lou Kachivas | Coslough Johnson | November 6, 1987 | 060 |
Bounty hunter Luke Jones arrives on New Texas to arrest Doc Clayton for a crime he did not commit. Clayton must prove his innocence. BraveStarr and Thirty/Thirty tell viewers running away from a problem will not make it disappear and the only way to solve the problem is to face it.
| 38 | "Buddy" | Ed Friedman | Barry O'Brien | November 9, 1987 | 040 |
BraveStarr's old friend Dallas Dodson and his handicapped son Buddy move to New Texas. BraveStarr makes Buddy an honorary undercover deputy, which the boy uses as an opportunity to prove to his father he is capable of doing things. BraveStarr and J.B. tell viewers talking is important in forming good relationships.
| 39 | "The Day the Town Was Taken" | Bill Nunes | Don Heckman | November 10, 1987 | 059 |
While BraveStarr, Thirty/Thirty and Fuzz help J.B. and Handlebar fend off a group of Dingoes in the desert, Tex Hex closes up Fort Kerium, trapping them outside. BraveStarr and Thirty/Thirty tell viewers to never judge somebody by their size.
| 40 | "BraveStarr and the Medallion" | Ernie Schmidt | Shirley Hartman | November 11, 1987 | 015 |
BraveStarr meets a stranger who appears to be a harmless man wearing the same medallion as his but is secretly conspiring with Tex Hex. Thirty/Thirty and Fuzz tell viewers things are not always what they seem.
| 41 | "Legend of a Pretty Lady" | Richard Trueblood | Richard Beban | November 12, 1987 | 062 |
J.B. is transported to one million years into the past due to a heat lightning accident. BraveStarr travels back in time to rescue her through a magic portal which Thirty/Thirty and Fuzz must protect from outlaws. Shaman and BraveStarr tell viewers to respect the beliefs of others.
| 42 | "Sunrise, Sunset" | Bill Reed | Bob Forward | November 13, 1987 | 061 |
A good man named Dorn Traymond joins a group of outlaws and they try to rob a bank. After nine months in hiding, by the time when his wife is pregnant and his father is dying, he sends a message to his family about his whereabouts and asks them to visit him, which BraveStarr finds out. BraveStarr tells viewers running away from trouble will not make it disappear.
| 43 | "Call of the Wild" | Tom Sito | Bob Forward | November 16, 1987 | 057 |
Wild Child has trouble adjusting to life in school due to classmates teasing him for being raised by Dingoes. When a disease infects the entire population of Fort Kerium except him and BraveStarr, the two must get the cure from the Dingo Llama. Wild Child tells viewers two wrongs don't make a right.
| 44 | "Tex But No Hex" | Marsh Lamore | Robert Lamb | November 17, 1987 | 050 |
Stampede punishes Tex Hex for his failures by taking away his powers. Tex is thus easily arrested and put on trial. BraveStarr and J.B. tell viewers being smart means obeying the law, not breaking it.
| 45 | "Space Zoo" | Lou Kachivas | Richard Beban | November 18, 1987 | 004 |
A strange, space warp portal has opened up on New Texas and Fuzz is asked to investigate. When Fuzz disappears into it, BraveStarr goes to rescue him and finds out an alien has been collecting creatures for himself. BraveStarr and Thirty/Thirty tell viewers friends are made through the Golden Rule.
| 46 | "Tex's Terrible Night" | Tom Tataranowicz | Don Heckman | December 14, 1987 | 046 |
When Tex Hex learns BraveStarr will be going away for Christmas, he plans to attack Fort Kerium. However, Shaman takes him on a journey to his past, present and future, and reveals his old girlfriend is coming to town on the day of the planned attack. BraveStarr and Shaman tell viewers there can be good even in the worst people and if one looks for it in people, they might find a friend. Note: This episode is based on A Christmas Carol.
| 47 | "Running Wild" | Ed Friedman | Don Heckman | January 29, 1988 | 045 |
Angus and BraveStarr investigate the damage on the water pod trees in New Cheyenne. The town blames it on a girl's pet ape cat and forms a mob. BraveStarr tells viewers wild creatures don't make good pets.
| 48 | "Thirty-Thirty Goes Camping" | Bill Nunes | Shawn Elizabeth Lamb | February 1, 1988 | 058 |
Moribund and Dingo Dan escape from prison and return to New Texas to find buried treasure that happens to be located in the same spot where Thirty/Thirty and a group of children are camping. BraveStarr tells viewers it is important to let their parents know where they are going.
| 49 | "The Haunted Shield" | Ernie Schmidt | Rowby Goren | February 2, 1988 | 036 |
After raiding a weapons department, Skuzz and Thunder Stick find the Haunted Shield of Specterius, which Stampede uses to defeat Shaman and leave the Prairie People to defend themselves. BraveStarr and Shaman tell viewers people don't always have to depend on someone else to do something difficult and may not realize what they can do until they try.
| 50 | "Ship of No Return" | Richard Trueblood | Dennis O'Flaherty | February 3, 1988 | 056 |
J.B.'s brother Kevin is the captain of a Kerium freighter that arrives on New Texas. BraveStarr, Thirty/Thirty, Fuzz, J.B. and Angus must help him find the crew when the computer that runs the ship decides to trap them. BraveStarr tells viewers love is powerful when given to people.
| 51 | "The Little Lie That Grew" | Bill Reed | Sy Gomberg | February 4, 1988 | 065 |
After their home is destroyed by Dingo Dan and the Rustlers, a family is invited to stay at Fort Kerium and agree to help out in the jail. Dan blackmails their young daughter, Posey, into helping him free his gang and then kidnaps her. BraveStarr and Thirty/Thirty tell viewers stealing always hurts somebody else.
| 52 | "Brothers in Crime" | Tom Sito | John Shirley | February 5, 1988 | 054 |
Orville, a shy boy with a stutter, learns that outlaws Craver and Grumble have been robbing miners at South Bend. He is captured by them, but befriends the latter, who is just looking for a friend like Orville is. BraveStarr, Grumble and Thirty/Thirty tell viewers a real friend does not get their friends in trouble, but helps them.
| 53 | "Sherlock Holmes in the 23rd Century: Part 1" | Tom Tataranowicz | Bob Forward | February 8, 1988 | 016 |
After falling down the Reichenbach Falls, Sherlock Holmes is transported to the year 2249 through a natural time warp. Meanwhile, BraveStarr travels to New London in search of a runaway alien boy named Fleeder and soon teams up with the detective.
| 54 | "Sherlock Holmes in the 23rd Century: Part 2" | Ernie Schmidt | Bob Forward | February 9, 1988 | 017 |
BraveStarr, Mycroft and Fleeder are captured by Professor Moriarty (voice of Jonathan Harris), who has survived as a result of suspended animation and now plots to take over Earth using Fleeder's special power of hypnotic singing.
| 55 | "New Texas Blues" | Marsh Lamore | Don Heckman | February 10, 1988 | 001 |
A galactic battle of the bands is held on New Texas. Stampede has Tex Hex give a guitar called the Black Widow, which when strummed will cause people to riot, to a contestant. BraveStarr tells viewers to not give in to temptation, no matter what is offered in return.
| 56 | "Jeremiah and the Prairie People" | Lou Kachivas | J. Larry Carroll | February 11, 1988 | 028 |
An old miner named Jeremiah has a map to a lost kerium treasure, which Sand Storm and Thunder Stick intend to steal. After he is attacked by one of the former's land crabs and saved by BraveStarr, Jeremiah is taken to recover in the Prairie People kingdom, where he learns about friendship. BraveStarr tells viewers friendship is more valuable than anything and works both ways.
| 57 | "The Ballad of Sara Jane" | Ed Friedman | Buzz Dixon | February 12, 1988 | 013 |
Thirty/Thirty attaches a turbo booster to Sara Jane that increases her firepower and later loses her. An innocent Fuufta child finds Sara Jane and uses it as a toy, unaware that it may explode due to the booster. BraveStarr tells viewers a real gun is not a toy.
| 58 | "Brother's Keeper" | Bill Nunes | Coslough Johnson | February 15, 1988 | 005 |
BraveStarr must prove the guilt of two crooks that have been robbing Stratostages. One of them wants to become good and must help BraveStarr obtain a rare serum that was stolen by the other and could save a sick man's life. BraveStarr tells viewers to listen to advice from family as they are the most loving and caring.
| 59 | "BraveStarr and the Empress" | Ernie Schmidt | John Shirley | February 16, 1988 | 063 |
BraveStarr is assigned to protect alien Empress Nadia, who is on the way to a peace conference with the leader of the Krang. He and Fuzz must stop her two aides who are trying to prevent her from making it to the summit. BraveStarr tells viewers the best way to make friends to find the ways they are alike.
| 60 | "Night of the Bronco-Tank" | Richard Trueblood | Michael Utvich | February 17, 1988 | 002 |
Stampede creates a gigantic robot called the Bronco-Tank, a combination of a brontosaurus and a tank, to destroy Fort Kerium. BraveStarr tells viewers sometimes cooperation is the best way to get something done.
| 61 | "Nomad Is an Island" | Bill Reed | Bob Forward | February 18, 1988 | 012 |
The evil Queen Singlish has her two minions capture Prairie People as slaves and Thirty/Thirty as her birthday present. BraveStarr, Thirty/Thirty and Fuzz tell viewers everyone has freedom and rights that cannot be taken away.
| 62 | "The Blockade" | Tom Sito | Shirley Hartman | February 19, 1988 | 064 |
Stampede uses his magic and a magnetic comet to create a blockade of asteroids surrounding New Texas. While BraveStarr goes into space to destroy it, the others must supply food for Fort Kerium and stop a Krang wizard. Handlebar tells viewers sharing is very important.
| 63 | "No Drums, No Trumpets" | Marsh Lamore | Don Heckman | February 22, 1988 | 008 |
A retired marshal named Paco moves to New Texas to start a new life as a farmer. His daughter Michelle views him as a coward because he refuses to fight. But when Sand Storm claims their valley as his and kidnaps her, Paco must team up with BraveStarr to rescue her, even if it means using his gun. Skuzz tells viewers smoking is addictive and dangerous.
| 64 | "Shake Hands with Long Arm John" | Lou Kachivas | John Shirley | February 23, 1988 | 055 |
Newcomer Long Arm John is deputized by Mayor Derringer after helping to save him when the Dune Buggy Gang attacks the Stratocoach. Fuzz is worried he will be replaced, but finds a chance to prove himself when Dingo Dan wreaks havoc in Fort Kerium. Long Arm John and BraveStarr tell viewers to always be careful where and what they touch.
| 65 | "Strength of the Bear" | Ed Friedman | James Davis | February 24, 1988 | 003 |
BraveStarr has lost his Spirit Animal powers. In order to regain them, he must renew his bond with the animal spirits. To this end, Shaman sends him alone and unarmed to the wilderness to face a trial of courage. BraveStarr and Shaman tell viewers their most important powers are the ones deep inside themselves.

== Broadcast ==
Bravestarr aired in US syndication beginning in September 1987. In the UK and Ireland, the show was broadcast on the satellite network The Children's Channel in 1988. In Germany, Bravestarr was broadcast on the satellite channel Tele 5, as part of the "Bim Bam Bino" children's show.

Reruns of the show aired on Qubo Night Owl from 2010 to 2013, and on the Retro Television Network from 2010 to 2015.

== Action figures and other merchandise ==
In 1986, a year before the TV series premiered, Mattel released an action figure line based on the Filmation cartoon series. These figures were large for the time at nearly eight inches (20 cm) tall and came in a windowed box with artwork similar to that of their Masters of the Universe contemporaries. Each figure had a unique action feature and was packaged with one or more Kerium nuggets.

Marshal BraveStarr and Tex Hex were packaged with a Laser Fire Backpack, which shot infrared beams and had "space-age" sound effects. Such backpacks were individually available—blue for heroes and black for villains. Other figures available were Handlebar, Sand Storm, Thirty/Thirty, Skuzz, Fuzz, Col. Borobot and Thunder Stick. The Neutra-Laser weapon, which worked with the infrared technology, and Fort Kerium playset also made their way to toy shelves. A second series of figures was designed but never produced. This included Dingo Dan, Judge J. B., Long Arm John, Rampage, and the Starr Hawk vehicle.

Lou Scheimer stated that Mattel hindered Bravestarr's success by releasing the toys before the pilot movie or TV series were released, leading viewers to think the show was based on the toy line.

Other forms of BraveStarr merchandise made their way to the market, including a Colorforms adventure set, View-Master reels, Ladybird storybook, pillow case, sticker album, and water gun, among others. A comic book series, BraveStarr in 3-D, began under Blackthorne Publishing in January 1987.

Recently, Ramen Toys, that specialise in producing third party toy products of 80s toy lines and icons, started producing a third party spin-off of Bravestarr, called The Marshal. A 6” figure of the titled character has been released, featuring multiple joints of articulation and swap-out limbs and accessories. The line has now seen the announced release of Thirty-Thirty, named Techno Horse.

== Video game ==
In 1987, a BraveStarr video game was released for Commodore 64, Amstrad CPC and ZX Spectrum. It is a side-scrolling shooter game.

== Unrealized projects ==
During Bravestarr's development, the show's writers planned a cross-over episode between Bravestarr and He-Man and the Masters of the Universe. This would have had a young Bravestarr encountering He-Man and being inspired by the former hero to become a lawman. Lou Scheimer also planned to create two animated series as spin-offs of Bravestarr. The first, Sherlock Holmes in the 23rd Century, would have continued from the events of the two Bravestarr episodes, and feature Holmes having adventures in a futuristic London. The second series, Bravo!, would have been a humorous series, about a group of Prairie People. The Prairie People (led by the titular Bravo) would have travelled in time back to prehistoric New Texas to fight the evil Bitter Root. Due to the closure of Filmation, neither of these projects ever came to fruition.

The pilot episode of Bravo!, "Fun with the Fuzzy Folk", was included as a bonus on the Bravestarr: Volume One DVD.

== Home releases ==
BraveStarr made its way to VHS in compilations such as Filmation All-Star Theatre and Sampler Collection. Individual episodes of the series found their way to shelves as late as 1989.

BCI Eclipse Entertainment, under its Ink & Paint classic animation entertainment label, under license from Entertainment Rights, released the entire series on DVD in Region 1 for the very first time in 2007/2008. Each episode on BCI Ink & Paint's DVD releases of BraveStarr was uncut, digitally remastered and presented in its original broadcast presentation and story continuity order. The series was released in two single-volume sets, with the first volume featuring several bonus features. As of 2009, these releases have been discontinued and are out of print as BCI Eclipse ceased operations.

In December 2010, Mill Creek Entertainment acquired the rights from Classic Media to re-release the series on DVD in North America. In May 2011, they released a complete series set, and two single-volume releases .

| DVD name | Ep # | Release date |
|---|---|---|
| BraveStarr – Volume One | 20 | May 10, 2011 |
| BraveStarr – Volume Two | 20 | May 10, 2011 |
| BraveStarr – Volume Three | 25 | Unreleased |
| BraveStarr – Complete Series | 65 | May 10, 2011 |

== Reception ==
Hal Erickson, discussing Bravestarr wrote, "The premise was viable, the graphics watchable, the animation servicable. What held Bravestarr back from being totally enjoyable was its sermonizing". Erickson argued that although the show contained laudable messages, "most of the Bravestarr episodes were nothing but lessons, hammering their points home in the blunt style of a homeroom detention teacher." Erickson did, however, praise Bravestarr for its "respectful and noncondesending treatment" of its Native American characters.

Mark Oakley of Den of Geek praised Bravestarr, writing "this was a well scripted show that remained faithful to its source inspiration...Bravestarr was a truly brilliant cartoon." However, Oakley criticised the character of Deputy Fuzz, saying "of all the annoying, gimmicky creatures to beset children's television, Fuzz is surely of Premier League class."

Spencer Bollettieri of Comic Book Resources also lauded the show, calling Bravestarr "a major milestone for Indigenous representation on Saturday mornings, and offering young viewers deeper stories and a sprawling sci-fi world that often bordered on horror." He compared Bravestarr favourably to Firefly and added "Bravestarr is a different kind of sci-fi western, but one that deserves a place beside the genre's most enduring stories."

== In popular culture ==
The music video for the Canadian electronic group The Halluci Nation's 2010 track, "Brave Step", features footage from Bravestarr.

== See also ==
- BraveStarr: The Movie
- The Adventures of the Galaxy Rangers
- Saber Rider and the Star Sheriffs

== Sources ==
- "BraveStarr". epguides.com. Archived from the original on February 8, 2006.
- "Filmation Associates: BraveStarr". The Big Cartoon Database.
