= Milk Race (video game) =

1987 video game

- ZX Spectrum box art
- Developer: Icon Design
- Publisher: Mastertronic
- Designers: Phil Berry; Stuart Ruecroft
- Composer: David Whittaker
- Platforms: ZX Spectrum, Commodore 64 Atari 8-bit, MSX, Amstrad CPC
- Release: 1987
- Genre: Racing
- Mode: Single-player

Professional ratings
Review scores
Source	Rating
Sinclair User	8/10
Commodore User	6/10
Tu Micro Amstrad	7/10
Crash	41%

Milk Race is a racing game released in 1987 for the ZX Spectrum, Commodore 64, Atari 8-bit computers, MSX, and Amstrad CPC. It was developed by Phil Berry, Stuart Ruecroft, and composer David Whittaker for Icon Design.

== Gameplay ==
The cyclist is about to grab a bottle of milk that will renew his energy bar (Atari 8-bit screenshot)

Based around the internationally acclaimed event in world cycle race The Milk Race (now known as Tour of Britain). This simulator was designed to coincide with the 1987 event, starting in Newcastle upon Tyne, through the North of England, and down through the Midlands, to London for the finishing line.

The player's bike moves from side to side to avoid potholes or other riders during the cycling race, which is conducted on a path that scrolls horizontally. The rider topples upon making contact with any danger, and valuable time is lost while he remounts. There are 12 gears on the bike, and as higher speeds are selected, the speed increases. The cyclist's energy is reduced as a bar on the screen decreases towards zero. The race must be abandoned if the cyclist is completely exhausted, however touching the milk bottles that frequently appear by the side of the road can restore energy reserves. There is the clock issue in addition to the energy issue. A timer counts down on several of the time trial stages. The race again ends early if the course isn't finished before the timer reaches zero.

Each stage is scored based on distance travelled, and the completion of a stage earns additional points. The cyclist who completes the race in the shortest amount of time is declared the winner.
