= Bad Company (video game) =

1990 video game

- Developer(s): Vectordean
- Publisher(s): Logotron
- Composer(s): David Whittaker
- Platform(s): Amiga, Atari ST
- Release: 1990
- Genre(s): Rail shooter, third-person shooter
- Mode(s): Single player

Bad Company is a video game developed by Vectordean and originally published by Logotron in 1990. Released for the Amiga and Atari ST computer systems, the game was based on the concept of 1984 arcade game Space Harrier, with a grittier and more militaristic visual design. In 1991, the Amiga version was reissued in the UK on Prism Leisure's "16-Bit Pocket Power" imprint.

== Reception ==
Bad Company received somewhat positive reviews from contemporary gaming magazines. Zero rated the game 78/100, calling it "very good value" and comparing it to a budget version of Space Harrier. Amiga Joker gave the Amiga version a 74%, and Amiga Format gave it a 71%. The Games Machine gave the Atari ST version a 72%, calling the graphics "well-detailed" but the £24.99 price "too expensive for such an old formula."

ACE gave the game a 642/1000, calling it "strong on atmosphere" and describing defeating tougher enemies as imparting "a considerable sense of achievement". However, it concluded that the game suffers from too little content, stating: "you soon tire of the simple pleasure of wasting things." Amiga Power gave it a 44/100, describing it as "failing to be [...] anything remotely complex" and "reasonably entertaining for five minutes or so." Power Play gave the game a 28/100, praising its presentation but stating there's "nothing behind it", concluding: "You are indeed in bad company with Bad Company if you bought it by mistake."
