= Total Recall (video game) =

1990 video game

- Developers: Ocean Software (CPC, C64, ZXS); Active Minds (Amiga, Atari ST); Interplay (NES)
- Publishers: Ocean Software; Acclaim (NES)
- Programmers: Alan Pavlish (NES); Michael Quarles (NES)
- Composers: George Sanger (NES); David Warhol (NES); David Whittaker (Amiga, Atari ST); Jonathan Dunn (C64, CPC, ZXS)
- Platforms: Amstrad CPC, Commodore 64, ZX Spectrum, NES, Amiga, Atari ST
- Release: 1990, 1991
- Genre: Platform
- Mode: Single-player

Total Recall is a 1990 platform game developed and published by Ocean Software that was released for the Commodore 64, Amiga, Amstrad CPC, ZX Spectrum, Atari ST, and Nintendo Entertainment System. Total Recall is based on the 1990 film of the same name.

== Development and release ==
Total Recall was released in 1990, and 1991 by Ocean Software for the ZX Spectrum, Commodore 64, and Amstrad CPC. The game was originally developed by Active Minds for the Amstrad CPC, ZX Spectrum and Commodore 64 until the project was rebooted by Ocean Software. The versions for Amiga and Atari ST was also developed in its original form without rebooting the project by Active Minds, of which Bobby Earl completed when he joined Ocean Software.

There was also a NES version which was notably different from the others, being developed by a different team (Interplay), who were subcontracted by Acclaim Entertainment. Interplay defended the changes, however, claiming that their alteration stuck closer to the spirit of the original short story, which they said "read more like a platformer." In a tie-in with the NES game, the August 1990 version of Nintendo Power promoted the game for their well-known monthly mail-in contests, with the Rekall slogan of "Making the Impossible Possible" whereby first prize would be one of the Martian police uniforms along with a videotaped trip to Hollywood with a chance to meet Schwarzenegger. Years later, the magazine admitted that it was their worst promotion, as "our winner did not get to meet Arnold until late 1991, and even then only for a quick handshake."

== Gameplay ==
The game includes platform segments and top-down racing scenes, with the player controlling Douglas Quaid.

== Reception ==
Reception

Review scores
Publication	Score
Amiga Action	78% (AMI); 78% (AMI)
Amiga Format	77% (AMI); 70% (AMI)
Amiga Power	41% (AMI)
Computer and Video Games	62% (AMI)
Electronic Gaming Monthly	3/10, 3/10, 3/10, 2/10 (NES)
Zzap!64	76% (C64); 70% (AMI)
Amiga Mania	81% (Amiga)
CU Amiga	77% (AMI); 63% (AMI, budget)
The One	70% (AMI)
Power Play	39% (NES); 33% (Amiga); 34%(C64)

Awards
Publication	Award
Crash	Crash Smash
Sinclair User	SU Classic
Amstrad Action	Mastergame

Crash reviewer Mark rated the game 94%. Richard rated the game 93% and believed players would love the game, saying "don't bother getting Rekall to remember it for you: go out and experience Total Recall for real!" Zzap! #71 (Mar 1991) rated the game C64 version of the game at 76%. Another Power Play reviewer rated the Amiga version at 33% and the C 64 version at 34%, criticizing both editions for having endless opponents and sloppy controls.

Several reviewers rated the Amiga version of the game. CU Amiga rated the game 77% and said "It's by no means a bad game, just a little stale. It follows a very successful formula but fails to rise above it." Computer and Video Games #111 (Feb 1991) rated the game 62% and said "a very polished game, but one I can only recommend to very patient players who haven't become bored of Ocean's film license format, which is beginning to look pretty tired nowadays." Amiga Action rated the Amiga version of the game 78% and said "Total Recall wasn't on the top of my list for games I was looking forward to I must confess. However, it is in fact quite good." Amiga Format rated the game 77% and said "A solid, polished package, only its late arrival, due to slipping in the schedules, deprived it of a full review." Zzap! #72 (Apr 1991) rated the game 70%.

The NES version was much more negatively received. A reviewer from German magazine Power Play rated the NES version 39% and questioned Quaid's intelligence, "trying to get rid of every bad guy on the right path and lure them into dark alleys only to offer a boring fight". He commented that these sequences "should not have been programmed at all, and that a lot of parts seem like a graphically strong, stripped-down Double Dragon". In Electronic Gaming Monthly (EGM), Steve Harris called it "a new low" for NES games due to its poor graphics and weak action, and Ed Semrad regarded it as a shocking disappointment given publisher Acclaim Entertainment's strong track record at the time. According to EGM, Acclaim pulled their ads from the magazine in response to the negative review.

Amiga Mania rated the Hit Squad re-release of the game at 81% and said "It's all full of style and all the things you wouldn't expect to find in a normal budget game, from the way Quaid crouches and fires to the fact that there's even a car chase!" Amiga Format #40 (Nov 1992) rated the game at 79% and said "The overall impression is one of a competent game which doesn't push the Amiga to within a tenth of its abilities." Amiga Action #37 (Oct 1992) rated the game 78% and said "If you like your games to give you a challenge at an affordable price then this is worth checking out, but there are far better products out there." CU Amiga rated the game 63%. Amiga Power rated the game 41% and said "Nice graphics, not-very-nice gameplay. Total Recall? (Totally predictably) Total Rubbish, more like."

The One gave the Amiga version of Total Recall an overall score of 70%, noting it as having 'limited lastability' due to its gameplay 'feeling the same throughout', but expressed that it's "inconsistent difficulty" provided variety. The One criticized Total Recall's graphics and sound, expressing that they are of 'inconsistent quality', calling the game's music "bland" and graphics "unspectacular" at times, but otherwise 'okay'. The One criticized the frequent disk swapping required, and further called Total Recall 'unoriginal', expressing that the game ought to have incorporated more elements from the film, and further stating that there are "so many better platform and race games [than Total Recall]".

The game reached number 2 in the UK ZX Spectrum sales charts, behind Teenage Mutant Ninja Turtles. In 1997 EGM ranked the NES version number 5 on their "Top 10 Worst Games of All Time". EGM's Seanbaby placed the NES version as number 15 in his "20 worst games of all time" feature.
