= Obliterator =

1988 video game

- Cover art by Roger Dean
- Publisher: Psygnosis
- Programmer: David H. Lawson
- Artists: Garvan Corbett; Jim Ray Bowers
- Composer: David Whittaker
- Platforms: Amiga, Amstrad CPC, Atari ST, MS-DOS, ZX Spectrum
- Release: 1988
- Genre: Action-adventure
- Mode: Single-player

Obliterator is a side-scrolling action-adventure game published by Psygnosis in 1988. It was released for Amiga, Atari ST, ZX Spectrum, Amstrad CPC, and MS-DOS. The game was programmed by David H. Lawson with graphics by Garvan Corbett and Jim Ray Bowers. The soundtrack was composed by David Whittaker, and the cover art is by Roger Dean.

== Plot ==
The game begins when the main character Drak, the last of the elite genetically enhanced super soldiers known as "Obliterators", has been sent on a suicide mission to stop an invincible alien spaceship that is approaching the earth. The objective of the game is to destroy the spaceship by finding certain objects from the ship. When the self-destruction is active, Drak has to find an escape shuttle before the spaceship blows up in order to survive.

== Gameplay ==
The gameplay mostly consists of Drak teleporting around the ship while searching for four symbols which are required to destroy the ship. Drak can jump, duck, and make diving rolls to avoid enemies and obstacles. Enemies start firing lasers once he enters their area. Enemies can respawn, and are mostly stationary. Drak has four weapons that are necessary to get past certain regions of the ship (certain powerful enemies require use of Drak's more powerful weapons).

== Reception ==
Obliterator was reviewed in Computer Gaming World as a fun, well-executed action game, albeit not a challenging one. The game was praised for using score not just as an arbitrary value, but also to determine the time left for the hero to escape.

C-lehti (3/1988) gave five stars for Amiga version and also full ten points for its music, graphics, interest-factor and "atmosphere". The review says that the game shows that the Amiga computer is capable of delivering what users have been awaiting, using computer's capabilities in a way that makes gaming experience a visual enjoyment. The review notes that the game is relatively easy to finish but still leaves a feeling that the game was worthy of its price. A possibility to save a game state on a disk is seen as an improvement to the previous game, Barbarian, from the authors.
