= Grange Hill (video game) =

1987 video game

- ZX Spectrum cover art
- Developer: Binary Design
- Publisher: Argus Press Software
- Designer: Colin Jones
- Platforms: Commodore 64, ZX Spectrum, Amstrad CPC
- Release: 1987
- Genre: Adventure
- Mode: Single-player

Grange Hill is a 1987 video game published by Argus Press Software for the Commodore 64, ZX Spectrum, and Amstrad CPC. It is based on Grange Hill, a popular children's television show. The music was done by David Whittaker, but did not include the TV show's theme tune.

The Commodore 64 version was coded by Michael Delves.

== Plot ==
The game's protagonist is Luke "Gonch" Gardener, with Paul "Hollo" Holloway as an assistant (see the list of pupils in Grange Hill). The object of the game is to retrieve Gonch's personal stereo from the school after hours, which his teacher confiscated.
