= 4 Soccer Simulators =

1988 video game

4 Soccer Simulators aka Pro Soccer Simulator
- Developer: Codemasters
- Publisher: Codemasters Gold
- Composer: Allister Brimble (NES)
- Platforms: Amstrad CPC, Commodore 64, ZX Spectrum, Nintendo Entertainment System, MS-DOS
- Release: 1988
- Genre: Soccer

4 Soccer Simulators (later released as Pro Soccer Simulator) is a collection of four association football video games developed by Codemasters and published in 1988. It includes 11-a-Side Soccer, Indoor Soccer, Soccer Skills and Street Soccer. The games all have vertically scrolling fields. The collection was released for ZX Spectrum, Amstrad CPC, MS-DOS, Nintendo Entertainment System and Commodore 64. It was advertised for Atari ST and Amiga, but these versions were never released.

== Reception ==
The Spanish magazine Microhobby valued the game with the following scores: Originality: 80%, Graphics: 70%, Motion: 70%, Sound: 80%, Difficulty: 70%, Addiction: 90%.
