= The Gold of the Aztecs =

1990 video game

- Developer(s): U.S. Gold
- Publisher(s): U.S. Gold
- Platform(s): Amiga, Atari ST, MS-DOS
- Release: 1990
- Genre(s): Platform

The Gold of the Aztecs is a platform game published in 1990 by U.S. Gold for the Amiga, Atari ST, and MS-DOS.

== Gameplay ==
The Gold of the Aztecs is a game in which Special Forces veteran Bret Conrad explores an Aztec tomb.

== Reception ==
Peter Olafson reviewed the game for Computer Gaming World, and stated that "as with any good game, players will learn the ways of The Gold of the Aztecs because they will want to and the game's conventions will quickly become second nature. Once this occurs, action gamers simply cannot help but fall for it... and fall... and fall... and fall."

Tom Malcom for Info gave the game three stars and said "I suppose I might like it better if I practiced enough to get used to the lethargic controls, but I'd rather not."

John Davison jnr for Page 6 said "I was not entirely impressed with Gold of the Aztecs. The graphics and sound are quite good, but the game is far from original and it is practically unplayable. I don't particularly like it, but you may well think it's brilliant. It is definitely not worth all the hype which has been spouted about it."
