= Kernkraft 400 =

1999 single by Zombie Nation

Single by Zombie Nation

from the album Leichenschmaus
- Released: 20 October 1999
- Genre: Electro; electroclash
- Length: 6:06 (Dj Gius mix); 3:27 (Dj Gius radio edit); 4:46 (original mix)
- Label: Drehscheibe
- Songwriters: Emanuel Günther; Florian Senfter; David Whittaker
- Producer: Zombie Nation

Music video
- "Kernkraft 400" on YouTube

"Kernkraft 400" (English: Nuclear Power 400) is a song performed by German techno musician Zombie Nation and the first single from the 1999 debut album, Leichenschmaus. It is a remix of the SID track "Star Dust" by David Whittaker, from his 1984 Commodore 64 game Lazy Jones. Though permission for the sampling was not initially granted, Whittaker was paid an undisclosed sum from Zombie Nation.

The remix of the original song, done by Cristiano Giusberti (as DJ Gius, also known as the hardstyle producer Technoboy) was issued as a single in October 1999. This version peaked at number 22 in Germany in February 2000 and became a top-10 hit in Flanders and the Netherlands several months later. In September, the song debuted and peaked at number two on the UK Singles Chart, remaining there for two weeks, and has received a platinum certification from the British Phonographic Industry (BPI) for sales and streams of at least 600,000 units. In the United States, the song peaked at number 99 on the Billboard Hot 100 chart.

The DJ Gius mix of "Kernkraft 400" is commonly used as a sports chant at sport stadiums (such as in American football, association football, baseball, basketball, and hockey) all over the world and was ranked number eight by Sports Illustrated in their list of "Top 10 Stadium Anthems".

In 2026, a popular white label bootleg version of DJ Gius' remix entitled Apocalyptic Mix appeared on the underground market. This new mix included the raw vocal of So Get Up by Californian poet-vocalist Ithaka Darin Pappas, an a capella that DJ Gius (as Technoboy) has utilized in other tracks he has been involved with such as Hardventure (by Italian artist K-Traxx) and Intensity (by his own group, TNT), leading some to speculate that DJ Guis himself had created the bootleg.

== Release ==
"Kernkraft 400" was first released in Germany (through Drehscheibe) and Spain (through Insolent Tracks) as a 12-inch single on 20 October 1999. The following year, the single was issued in the United Kingdom on 18 September by Data Records and in New Zealand on 27 November through the Bang On! label.

== Music video ==
The music video of "Kernkraft 400" starts out inside a nuclear power plant room where an infomercial host (Florian Senfter) dressed in '70s disco clothing comes out and later two models (Cindy and Mindy) come onto scene dancing. One model puts a plate of food into a trademarked Kernkraft 400™ microwave oven, which cooks the food much faster and hotter than the other model's conventional microwave oven. Mindy then gets into a standard tanning bed, while Cindy waits before getting into a Kernkraft 400™. Mindy reveals a sunburnt tan, while Cindy has a perfect sun tan which has even worked under her beachwear. Finally, the host sits on a couch in the studio, off camera, where he examines a standard vibrator and a Kernkraft 400™ version. As the camera pulls away, both women are seen running towards the host while the video production staff are seen wearing hazmat suits.

The video was produced and directed by Hendrik Hölzemann, Grischa Schmitz and Dominique Schuchman who at that time were studying film at the Filmacademy Ludwigsburg, under the name Panic Pictures. Cindy is played by Julia Pritzel, while Mindy is played by Silke Fernald.

== Reception ==
Select reviewed the single and noted its widespread popularity, calling it "as welcome in Pacha as in the Munich underpass, Tongo and Coxo like this Teutonic techno," as well as noting it was "Not bad for a couple of DJs called Splank and Mooner".

In the liner notes of the Kiss mix album Kiss House Nation 2001, Mixmag music editor Matthew Kershaw named the song among 2000's "uncategorisable" club tracks, noting it "was championed everywhere from children's television to the most underground techno clubs. Was it techno, trance, electro or house? No-one knew, and frankly, no one cared."

== In popular culture ==
"Kernkraft 400" first received US radio airplay on now defunct station Energy 92.7 & 5 in Chicago, Illinois in 2001. Due to its popularity with all ages on that station, it was first introduced to sports fans at Chicago Rush arena football games. The song was not a featured song during player introductions but received regular play during timeouts and commercial breaks to assist in keeping the indoor American Football fans loud and aroused at the team's home field at Allstate Arena in suburban Rosemont, Il.

The song was briefly featured in 2004 Edgar Wright film Shaun of the Dead.

Collegiate athletic teams have been using the song during sporting events as early as 2005. Notably, Skip Prosser introduced the song to Wake Forest men's basketball games as early as the 2004/05 season while head coach of the Demon Deacons. The song gained prominence and became a staple of both men's and women's teams during tip-offs and fast breaks. Penn State football also famously began using "Kernkraft 400" in the fall of 2005. During the break in the song, fans chant "We Are Penn State."

The UCF Knights began using "Kernkraft 400" as their rallying anthem at least as early as 2007 with the opening of FBC Mortgage Stadium. When the song plays, UCF fans jump chanting "U-C-F Knights" during the breaks in the song. The song became controversial on campus as it became a cue for fans to start jumping, which when done in unison makes the stadium reverberate and bounce, earning it the nickname, "The Bounce House". University officials originally wanted to stop playing the song all together for the longevity of the built stadium, but after safety inspections showed no structural damage, they instead settled on playing shorter clips of the song fewer times during a game.

Many professional sports teams, most prominently the Boston Bruins but also including Leigh Leopards, Milwaukee Admirals, Toronto Maple Leafs, Los Angeles Dodgers, New Jersey Devils, Atlanta United, Atlanta Braves, Atlanta Thrashers, Gent, Real Valladolid, Celtic, A.C. Milan, Beitar Jerusalem, Southampton, PSV Eindhoven, Tranmere Rovers, Pittsburgh Steelers, Cleveland Monsters, Indianapolis Colts, Gillingham, Geelong Cats, Vanderbilt University athletics and the Oklahoma City Thunder play (or have played) "Kernkraft 400" either as part of pregame introductions, after scoring, or for wins. The Seattle Mariners also play the song after a big hit or during rallies at T-Mobile Park.

In 2015, the Stadium Chant Anthem Mix was used in the film Focus.

The song became a semi-official anthem for Welsh football fans during their country's qualification campaign for UEFA Euro 2016. This stems from an incident after their 0–0 draw with Belgium at Stade Roi Baudouin in Brussels, in which the travelling Welsh fans danced enthusiastically to the song being played over the stadium's public address system. As a result, the song was played before the return fixture at Cardiff City Stadium on 12 June 2015. The song is still played before every Wales game at the Cardiff City Stadium.

"Kernkraft 400" has been sampled by various artists, including rapper The Game in the single "Red Nation".

"Kernkraft 400" is featured in the soundtrack of the 2012 video game NHL 13, which uses the "Stadium Chant Mix" version.

On 8 May 2022, W268BB 101.5 in State College, Pennsylvania launched the station by playing this song over and over for a week.

Elemental (2023) uses the "Live Remix" version (credited in-film as the "Sport Chant Stadium Remix") of this song during the airball game at Cyclone Stadium.

It is the entrance theme of the relief pitcher Yasuaki Yamasaki, the cheering entrance is also known as Yasuaki Jump (ヤスアキJUMP, Yasuaki janpu).

== Charts ==
=== Weekly charts ===
Chart (1999–2001)	Peak position
Australia (ARIA)	86
Belgium (Ultratop 50 Flanders)	10
Canada (Nielsen SoundScan)	16
Canada Dance/Urban (RPM)	1
Europe (Eurochart Hot 100)	12
France (SNEP)	100
Germany (GfK)	22
Greece (IFPI)	1
Ireland (IRMA)	2
Ireland Dance (IRMA)	1
Netherlands (Dutch Top 40)	8
Netherlands (Single Top 100)	5
Scottish Singles Sales (Official Charts)	2
UK Singles (Official Charts)	2
UK Dance (Official Charts)	1
US Billboard Hot 100	99
US Dance Club Play (Billboard)	47
US Maxi-Singles Sales (Billboard)	3

=== Year-end charts ===
Chart (2000)	Position
Belgium (Ultratop 50 Flanders)	67
Ireland (IRMA)	39
Netherlands (Dutch Top 40)	82
Netherlands (Single Top 100)	67
UK Singles (OCC)	38
US Maxi-Singles Sales (Billboard)	12

== Certifications ==
Region	Certification	Certified units/sales
United Kingdom (BPI)	Platinum	600,000^{‡}
^{‡} Sales+streaming figures based on certification alone.

== "Kernkraft 400 (A Better Day)" ==
On 17 June 2022, German DJ Topic and Swedish singer A7S released the cover "Kernkraft 400 (A Better Day)". The song charted at 26 on the German chart.

=== Charts ===
==== Weekly charts ====
Chart (2022–2026)	Peak position
Austria (Ö3 Austria Top 40)	34
France (SNEP)	133
Germany (GfK)	26
Hungary (Rádiós Top 40)	30
Netherlands (Dutch Top 40)	10
Netherlands (Single Top 100)	29
Switzerland (Schweizer Hitparade)	100

==== Year-end charts ====
Chart (2022)	Position
Germany (GfK)	77
Netherlands (Dutch Top 40)	57

=== Certifications ===
Region	Certification	Certified units/sales
Austria (IFPI Austria)	Platinum	30,000^{‡}
Canada (Music Canada)	Gold	40,000^{‡}
France (SNEP)	Gold	100,000^{‡}
Germany (BVMI)	Gold	200,000^{‡}
Poland (ZPAV)	Gold	25,000^{‡}
^{‡} Sales+streaming figures based on certification alone.
