= Sweet Vacation =

Japanese pop music group

- Also known as: Suibake/スイバケ
- Origin: Japan
- Genres: Pop, house
- Years active: 2007-present
- Labels: Victor Entertainment; production = Bug Corporation
- Members: Hayakawa Daichi (Sound producer, Keyboard); May (Vocals)
- Website: www.sweetvacation.jp/

Sweet Vacation（スウィート・バケイション）is a Japanese music unit made of members Hayakawa Daichi and Thai vocalist May. Both come from a history of high level universities. Hayakawa left Tokyo University's Graduate School before graduating while May was previously enrolled in Chulalongkorn University in Bangkok, and began taking classes at Waseda University in fall 2009.

== History ==
In order to begin a new project with a new vocalist, Daichi was traveling when he met May in Bangkok, and in 2006, Sweet Vacation was formed.

Their official MySpace page began on August 19, 2007, and they made their debut on the iTunes Store Japan on October 10 of the same year with their song "I Feel So Good" advertised as the free download of the week. They then released their first indies album "Do the Vacation!!" on November 21.

In January 2008, they released their song "Shining Groove (Your Song 2008)" on Yahoo! Music Japan's website. This song was licensed by Creative Commons.

On March 27, 2008, the Japan Rights Clearance (JRC) made an agreement with YouTube over copyrighted material being used, and through this management of music distribution through the JRC, a plan for a Sweet Vacation official channel on YouTube was also begun.

On August 20, 2008, Sweet Vacation made their major debut under Victor Entertainment with the mini album "I Miss You" EP. Beginning their career as a major label artist on August 27, they allowed for 10,000 free rentals of the CD "I Feel So Good (2nd edition)" from TSUTAYA shops across the nation.

On February 18, 2009, their first major single "Sayonara my days" was released.

On March 24, 2009, the album "Kira Kira Pop!!" (limited time sale) was released in Thailand.

On July 8, 2009, the Tower Records exclusive single "Ai ni ikou ~I・NEED・TO・ GO~" was released.

On August 5, 2009, the album "pop save the world!!" was released and topped in the oricon music charts at #61. There was also a worldwide simultaneous release on iTunes on the same day.

== Members ==
=== Hayakawa Daichi ===
  - Name: Hayagawa Daichi
  - Position: Chorus, Sound Producer, Keyboard
  - Birthday: August 19, 1977
  - Height: 172 cm (5 ft 8 in)
  - Hometown: Tokyo

=== May ===
  - Real Name: Sitapha Uttaburanont
  - Position: Lead Vocals
  - Birthday: May 4, 1990
  - Height: 160 cm (5 ft 3 in)
  - Hometown: Bangkok, Thailand
  - Languages: Thai, English, Japanese, Chinese[Mandarin]
  - Siblings: 1 older brother

In 2003, May became a member of the Thai talent project G-Junior and in 2006 made her debut in the girls only section of that project in an 11-person unit called Preppy G. That same fall, she met Daichi while he was in Thailand and in 2007 began working in the unit Sweet Vacation with him. In addition to doing vocals, she is also the talent icon for FITS' "Sexy Girl Hair Cologne" television commercial.

In April 2008, she began taking classes at Chulalongkorn University, and so was managing both her university life and work in the entertainment world simultaneously. She took a break from classes the following semester, and after moving to Japan in June 2009, she entered the School of International Liberal Studies at Waseda University in September 2009 with excellent entrance exam results and was selected as the grantee for Waseda University's 125th anniversary scholarship.

== Discography ==
=== Studio albums ===
==== Indies ====
- Do the Vacation!! （2007.11.21）
  1. Trick or Treat （Lyrics: Sweet Vacation / Music: Daichi Hayakawa / Arrangement: Daichi Hayakawa）
  2. The Goonies 'r' Good Enough （Cyndi Lauper cover）
  3. I Feel So Good (2nd edition) （Lyrics: Sweet Vacation / Music: Daichi Hayakawa / Arrangement: Daichi Hayakawa）
  4. Material Girl （Madonna cover）
  5. Magic Smile （Lyrics: Sweet Vacation / Music: Daichi Hayakawa / Arrangement: Daichi Hayakawa & Kazumi Yudo）
  6. HONKY TONKY CRAZY （BOØWY cover）
  7. Get up Boys and Girls （Lyrics: Sweet Vacation / Music: Daichi Hayakawa / Arrangement: Daichi Hayakawa & GROOVE UNCHANT）
- More the Vacation!! （2008.4.16）
  1. Looking For The Future
  2. Speed of Sound （Coldplay cover）
  3. Sexy Girl （Sexy Girl Hair Cologne commercial song）
  4. Girls & Boys （Blur cover）
  5. Asobi ni ikou yo (遊びに行こうよ) (2nd edition)
  6. We love the EARTH （TMN cover、first performed live at a Yokohama concert）
  7. World Is So Grooving （a song introduced on MySpace）

==== Major label ====
- I Miss You EP （2008.8.20）
  1. I miss you (Yume de aetara (ユメデアエタラ))
  2. Summer Day (ver.1.0)
  3. Super Slider Boy
  4. Sweet Child O' Mine (2nd edition) （Guns N' Roses cover）
  5. Sexy Girl (A-bee Remix)
- Kira Kira Pop!!! (2009.3.24) – Thailand Only Release
  1. Looking For the Future
  2. Sexy Girl (Thai Version)
  3. Speed of Sound
  4. Bitter or Sweet
  5. Girls & Boys
  6. 遊びに行こうよ - 2nd edition
  7. We Love the EARTH
  8. World is So Grooving
  9. The Goonies 'r' Good Enough
  10. Summer Day (Thai Version)
  11. Material Girl
  12. I Feel So Good (Thai Version)
  13. Sexy Girl (Japanese Version)
  14. I Feel So Good (Toy Piano Mix)
- pop save the world!! (2009.08.05)
  1. sexy girl returns ～intro～
  2. why don't you（2nd edition）
  3. あいにいこう ～I・NEED・TO・GO～（2nd edition）
  4. キラメキジェット (Kirameki Jet)
  5. さよならマイデイズ 2nd edition (Sayonara my days)
  6. Vacation ～Interlude～
  7. Life is MiRACLE
  8. Magical Mystery Tour
  9. Brandnew Wave
  10. Shooting Star
  11. 8bit darling
  12. Escape!!
  13. I miss you ～ユメデアエタラ～
  14. believe in, pop will save the world？ ～outro～
- Suibake No Early Best +8 (2011.04.13)
  1. Magic Smile
  2. Asobi ni Ikou Yo ~2nd Edition~
  3. I Feel So Good (Thai version)
  4. Sexy Girl (Thai version)
  5. Summer Day (Thai version)
  6. Get up Boys and Girls
  7. World is so grooving
  8. Bitter or Sweet
  9. Catch Me Now
  10. Love Camera ~ Sekai ga Koisuru Message [Toku P Re-mix]
  11. TOKYO DAYS [U-ji Re-mix]
  12. Heavens Discotheque [Iieru P Re-mix]
  13. Magic Smile [Peperon P Re-mix]
  14. Kiramekijetto! [SWANTONE Re-mix]
  15. Summer Day [Sugimoto P Re-mix]
  16. Unbalance [Shizuku P Re-mix]

DVD Contents:

  1. あいにいこう 〜I・NEED・TO・GO〜 PV
  2. さよならマイデイズ
  3. I miss you 〜ユメデアエタラ〜
  4. Summer Day PV
  5. why don't you PV
- Re;未来派宣言 (Re; miraiha sengen) (2010.07.14)
  1. Futurhythm
  2. グッディグッディ (Goody goody)
  3. ラブカメラ ～セカイが恋するメッセージ～ (Love camera ~sekai ga koisuru message~)
  4. TOKYO DAYS
  5. re-boot
  6. さよならBye Bye (Sayonara Bye Bye)
  7. Tic tac
  8. アンバランス (Unbalance)
  9. heaven's discotheque
  10. ラブカメラ retweet (Love camera retweet)
  11. [Extra Track] I Feel So Good More（★STARGUiTAR RMX）

=== Singles ===
==== Major label ====
Sayonara my days (さよならマイデイズ)（2009.2.18）
1. Sayonara my days (さよならマイデイズ)
2. Calling You （Ario Bazaar commercial song）
3. Suddenly I See （KT Tunstall cover）
4. I miss you 〜ユメデアエタラ〜 (FREEDOMBUNCH CLUBMIX) (Extended Version)
5. Sayonara my days (さよならマイデイズ) (Instrumental)

Ai ni ikou (あいにいこう) ～I・NEED・TO・GO～ (2009.7.8)
1. あいにいこう～I・NEED・TO・GO～
2. Because of you (Ne-Yo cover)
3. Summer Day (DJ TARO "hbs" Remix)

=== Digital releases ===
- 「Summer Day (ver.0)」 - mF247 （Music Distribution Website） Limited Time Release （2007.9.21）
- 「Bitter or Sweet」 - Limited Time Release Valentine's Day song（2008.1.30）
- 「Shining Groove 〜Your Song 2008〜」 - Yahoo!ミュージック （2008.1）
- 「heavens discotheque (ver.0)」 - Digital TSUTAYA （Chaku uta website） free demo version download
- ラブカメラ ～セカイが恋するメッセージ～ (Love camera ~sekai ga koisuru message~) (2010.02.10)
