= Last Mission (video game) =

1986 video game

- Arcade flyer
- Developer: Data East
- Publisher: Data East: EU: U.S. Gold (ports)
- Designers: Akira Sakuma; Kenji Nishikawa, Tomotaka Osada, Kenichi Fujimoto (hardware)
- Programmers: Akira Sakuma, Satoshi Imamura (arcade); Keith Purkiss (C64)
- Artists: Harumi Nomura; Atsushi Kushima; Shinji Noda; Koji Akibayashi; Super; Tak
- Composers: Yukihiko Kitahara, Michiya Hirasawa, Azusa Hara (arcade); David Whittaker (C64)
- Platforms: Arcade, Commodore 64, ZX Spectrum
- Release: 1986
- Genre: Multidirectional shooter
- Modes: Single-player, multiplayer

Last Mission is a 1986 multidirectional shooter video game developed and published by Data East for arcades. The game is similar to Time Pilot as players have full movement control over their ship and can move it in all eight directions.

== Plot ==
The players assume the role of an alien-humanoid space pilot who has been exiled from their home galaxy for committing an unlearned crime. The only way the player character can return is to restore their honor; the only way to do so is to invade and defeat the alien invaders who have been known to frequently attack the player character's people using a ship called the Main Fighter.

== Reception ==
Reception

Award
Publication	Award
Computer and Video Games	C+VG Hit

In Japan, Game Machine listed Last Mission on their December 1, 1986 issue as being the fourth most-successful table arcade unit of the month.
