= The Legend of William Tell (video game) =

1990 video game

- Developer(s): Electronic Zoo
- Publisher(s): Electronic Zoo
- Series: Crossbow
- Platform(s): Atari ST, Amiga
- Release: 1990
- Genre(s): Action-adventure

The Legend of William Tell (also Crossbow: The Legend of William Tell) is a 1990 video game published by Electronic Zoo, based on the TV series Crossbow. It was released for the Atari ST and Amiga.

== Gameplay ==
The Legend of William Tell is a game in which the player is William Tell traveling through the English countryside and into the fortress of Austrian tyrant Gessler.

== Reception ==
Allen L. Greenberg reviewed the game for Computer Gaming World, and stated that "The Legend Of William Tell is a very limited product for adventure gamers and offers only a modicum of appeal to the action gamer."
