= Kid Gloves (video game) =

1990 platforming video game

- Publisher: Millennium Interactive
- Composer: David Whittaker
- Platforms: Amiga, Atari ST
- Release: EU: 1990
- Genre: Platformer
- Mode: Single-player

Kid Gloves is a 1990 computer game for the Amiga and Atari ST published by Millennium Interactive. A flick-screen platform game, Kid Gloves involves the player progressing through a series of themed single-screen stages. The game was cover-mounted on the second issue of Amiga Power magazine in 1991.
