= Super League Manager =

1995 video game

- Developer(s): Audiogenic
- Publisher(s): Audiogenic
- Platform(s): Amiga
- Release: 1995
- Genre(s): Sports game, simulation

Super League Manager is a 1995 football management simulation computer game published and developed by Audiogenic for the Amiga platform. The game was noticed for avoiding the statistics heavy approach common in football management simulation games and instead focused on the human side. The game could be combined with Emlyn Hughes International Soccer or Wembley International Soccer (depending on their system) to allow the player to directly control the team for every fifth game. Amiga computing rated the game at 46% speaking positively of the game's attempt to focus on the human side of management while criticising the games interface and sound. Amiga Action gave the game a rating of 34%.
