= Skateball =

1989 video game

- Cover art (C64)
- Developer: Ubi Soft
- Publisher: Ubi Soft
- Platforms: Amstrad CPC, GX4000, Atari ST, Commodore 64, ZX Spectrum
- Release: EU: 1989
- Modes: Single-player, multiplayer

Skateball is a video game developed by Ubi Soft. It features a violent futuristic sports game part ice skating, part soccer. It was released in 1989 for the Amstrad CPC and GX4000, Atari ST, Commodore 64 and ZX Spectrum.

In 1990, Ubi Soft re-issued the game with a new title: Skate Wars. This title was also used by Ocean Software for the 1992 budget release on their Hit Squad label.

== Gameplay ==
A Skateball match is played by two teams on an ice court with steel walls and ball. There are several different courts with holes and other lethal obstacles. The game lacks any rules and any kind of contact is allowed.

The game can be played by one or two players. Each team has three players, one of them a goalkeeper. The object of the game is to score five goals or kill the three players of the opposite team.
