= International Monster Truck Hall of Fame =

Museum of monster truck competition history

Coordinates: 41°19′59″N 85°05′30″W

The International Monster Truck Hall of Fame, based in Auburn, Indiana, is a shrine to the best drivers in history of monster truck competition. The hall is part of the Kruse Automotive and Carriage Museum.

The hall also displays monster trucks from the earliest days of competition.

== First class (2011) ==
These were drivers recognized as the "originals" of the sport

- Bob Chandler – Bigfoot
- Jeff Dane – King Kong
- Dan Degrasso – Beast
- Jack Willman – Taurus
- Everett Jasmer – USA-1
- Fred Shafer – Bear Foot

== Second class (2012) ==
- Jim Kramer – Bigfoot
- Mike Welch – Mike Welch Motorsports
- George Carpenter – Promoter, Safety Director, and Tech Official
- Dennis Anderson – Grave Digger
- Pablo Huffaker – Jus Showin Off, Grave Digger

== Third class (2013) ==
- Gary Porter – Carolina Crusher, Grave Digger, Spider-Man
- Allen Pezo – Predator racing
- Dan Patrick – Patrick Enterprises, Samson
- Scott Stephens – King Krunch, Coors Brewer, Auto Value
- Army Armstrong – TV/Live Event Personality/Motorsports Radio

== Fourth class (2014) ==
- Michael Vaters – Black Stallion, Vaters Motorsports
- Kirk Dabney – Blue Thunder, Nitemare, Extreme Overkill, Monster Patrol
- Jon Breen – Mad Dog
- Diehl Wilson – Virginia Giant
- Andy Brass – Bigfoot

== Fifth class (2015) ==
- Billy Joe Miles – President at TNT Motorsports
- David Morris – Equalizer
- Gene Patterson – Stomper Bully, Bigfoot, Snake Bite (As Colt Cobra until 1995)
- Alan Tura – Goliath, G-Force

== Sixth class (2016) ==
- Bob George – Founder of USHRA/SRO (PACE, now FELD)
- Charlie Pauken – Excaliber, Grave Digger, Monster Mutt
- Jerry Richmond – Terminator, Weapon 1, Lethal Weapon, Overkill
- Terry Woodcock – Unnamed and Untamed, Cyclops, Generation X

== Seventh class (2017) ==
- Gary Cook – Creator of Equalizer
- Jeff Bainter – Driver of Captain USA, High Voltage/Hot Stuff Jeeps
- Mike Galloway – Retired Television/Live Event Personality
- Seth Doulton – Owner of Golden State Promotions
- Jim Reis – Retired driver at Golden State Promotions

== Eighth class (2018) ==
- Gary Bauer – Driver of Lon-Ranger, Nitemare, Screamin Demon
- Marty Garza – Founder of Overkill Monster Truck racing
- Jack Koberna – Driver of Grave Digger 4, Savage Beast, Cyborg, and Tuff-E-Nuff
- Mike Nickell – Retired Driver of Excaliber

== Ninth class (2019) ==
- Dan Runte – Driver of Bigfoot, Sometimes drove Snake Bite under the name "Rick Rattler"
- Aaron Polburn – Founder of Thunder Nationals/Monster Nationals
- Cliff Starbird – Monster Vette, Wild Stang, Frankenstein
- Jesse Birgy – Driver of Playn For Keeps (Deceased)

== Tenth Class (2020) ==
- Dave Marquart- Excaliber (Deceased)
- Scott Hess- Bear Foot Sport, Hercules (Retired)
- Kevin Dabney- Alien, Chi Town Hustler (Retired)
- Mark Bendler- Kodiak, Shockwave (retired)

== Eleventh Class (2021) ==
- Tim Hall (Executioner, Rammunition, Iceman, Big Boss, Heavy Metal, crew chief at Hall Brothers Racing)
- Mark Hall (Executioner, Raminator, Big Boss, Heavy Metal, Bulldozer, Smoke Craft)
- Bobby Holman (Holman's BEAST, Lucas Oil Stabilizer, Craniac, Bear Foot)
- John Moore (No Problem!)

== Twelfth Class (2022) ==
- Steve Hess (Nitemare)
- Don Maples (Samson)
- Charlie Mancuso (USHRA)
- Steve Combs (Knight Stalker)

== Thirteenth Class (2023) ==
- Frank Schettini (Big Dummy)
- Guy Wood (Bulldozer, Heartland Express)
- William Townes (Virginia Beach Beast)

== Fourteenth Class (2024) ==
- Jeff Cook (Founder of museum/War Wagon)
- Rob Fuchs (First Blood)
- Scott Douglass (announcer)

== Fifteenth Class (2025) ==
- Ron Bachmann (Bigfoot)
- Jim Koehler (Avenger)
- Steve Dane (King Kong)
