= Raminator (truck) =

Monster truck

Raminator, Rammunition & Hotsy
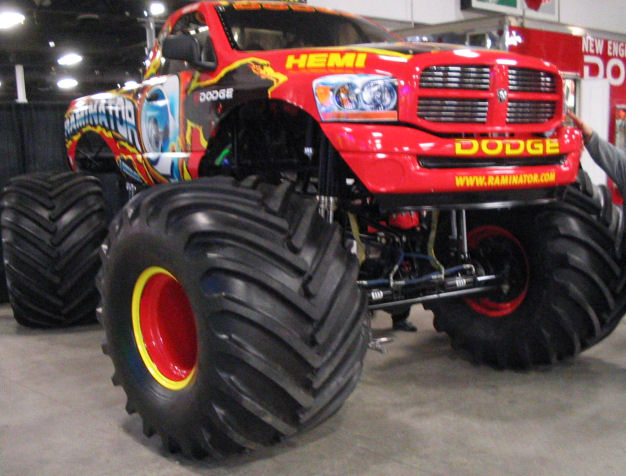
- Raminator at the 2006 Boston World of Wheels

Owner and driver information
- Owner: Hall Bros. Racing
- Driver(s): Mark Hall, Kurt Kraehmer, Geremie Dishman, Mat Dishman, Dale Benear, Mike Miller, Tim Hall

Truck information
- Engine: 565 CI. BAE Supercharged Hemi

Raminator, Rammunition and Hotsy are monster trucks that race on the Monster Jam, Monster Nationals and ProMT tours. They are currently driven by Mark Hall and Kurt Kraehmer. The team is sponsored by Ram Trucks. Until recently, the team was, along with Team Bigfoot, one of the most high-profile teams to not run in Monster Jam, although since 2017, they have competed in several Monster Jam tours.

== History ==
In 1986, Tim and Mark Hall of Thomasboro, Illinois officially formed 'Hall Brothers Racing', and began campaigning their first creation: the "Heavy Metal" tracked monster truck. The team soon acquired sponsorship from remote control car manufacturer Kyosho. The Halls then created the "Big Boss", their first venture into the world of more traditional "rubber tire trucks", a.k.a. monster trucks as they are known today. "Big Boss" was the first monster truck to derive its paint scheme from that of an RC car, as opposed to the other way around. The "Big Boss" was destroyed during a race in 1991, around the time their first true tube-chassis race monster truck was completed. The truck debuted as "USA-1" as a partnership with Everett Jasmer (with Kyosho and True Value as sponsors), the truck did not run for long with that particular moniker because the Halls wanted to go back out on their own.

"Executioner" would be the new name for the Halls' truck, which went on to campaign very respectably in USHRA (1992-Feb 2002), Special Events' PENDA Series (1992-96), USA Motorsports (1993-98), and ProMT (2000-01). Several custom race chassis built by Hall Brothers Racing carried the "Executioner" nameplate during these years, at first using GMC and Chevrolet bodies, and eventually switching to Dodge bodies just prior to the millennium. The truck featured a recognizable black & white (later changed to red & white) checkerboard paint scheme, designed and painted originally by Tim Hall and close friend and associate Darrell Wagner. The truck adopted a far more radical paint scheme in 2000, which featured flames, tribal pinstriping, and detailed airbrushing. This scheme appeared on the Dodge bodies only.

Seeing the success the Halls were having as privateers in the monster truck industry, Dodge decided to return to corporate sponsorship of monster truck racing after a nearly six-year hiatus (having last sponsored Fred Shafer's Bear Foot team from 1992-96). After a year of scouting and preparations in 2001, the Dodge division of Daimler-Chrysler signed a three-year deal with the Halls. Hall Brothers Racing debuted the first Dodge Raminator truck at a USHRA event in the Pontiac Silverdome in January 2002. The truck ran one more weekend with USHRA, then ceased to compete at any more Monster Jam events. This would subsequently gain strong support from fans who disagree with their spectacle-oriented shows. The team would return to Monster Jam in 2007.

With Mark Hall driving and brother Tim Hall serving as crew chief, the team won 4 of 7 ProMT races in 2002 en route to earning their first championship. With strong showings at Monster Nationals and Special Events races that year as well, along with the addition of the "Rammunition" race truck piloted by rookie Dale Benear, the team exceeded Dodge's expectations.

In 2003, the Halls entered a streak of dominance that had not been seen since Team Bigfoot's 4-straight PENDA Series championships. That year, the team clinched the Monster Nationals and Special Events titles (the ProMT series took a hiatus). 2004 would see a repeat, as Hall and Raminator clinched yet another Monster Nationals championship and the combined ProMT/Special Events title as well. 2005 proved to be an even further extension of the team's dominance, as Hall would once again claim the Monster Nationals and Special Events championship honors. These feats on-track combined with the team's ever growing fleet of trucks and dealership appearances would incite Dodge to renew the team's sponsorship through 2007, with an option for further involvement after that.

== Hallmarks ==
Raminator and Rammunition are both among the most feared opponents in racing. The factory backing has allowed for significant performance gains, especially concerning the engine. The team is especially notable for ending Bigfoot's dominance in ProMT and the Special Events series, where the Ford had previously been untouchable.

The horsepower advantage has also translated into high-flying freestyles, although the drivers are markedly more conservative than their Monster Jam counterparts. However, as the Halls have often criticized the destructive nature of USHRA events, and are quick to point out how few rollovers they have had, their conservatism is a point of pride for the team. As a result, the team is tremendously popular with fans who dislike Monster Jam, particularly those who would like to see a racing-exclusive series.

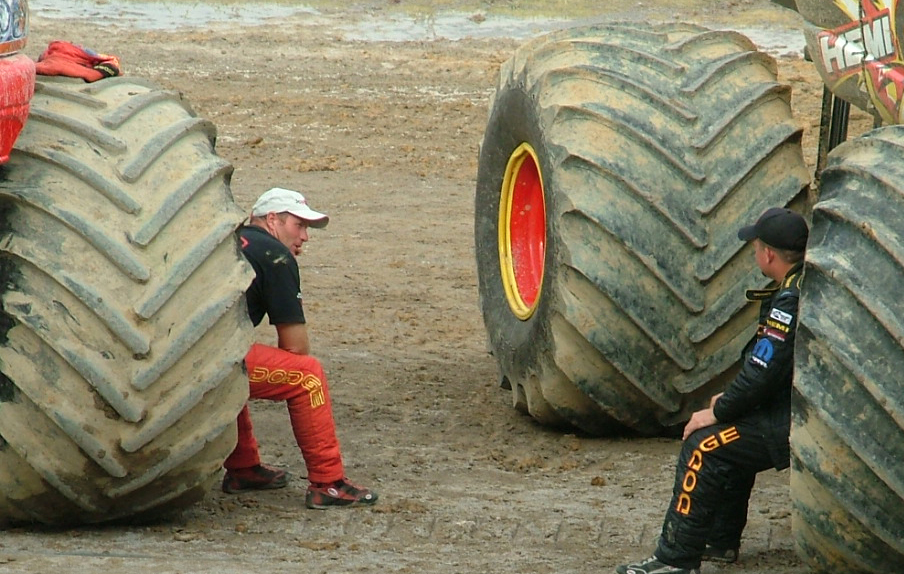
Taking a short rest before the second race at Canfield, OH

=== Monster Truck Racing Association ===
- 1996: Driver of the Year, Mark Hall
- 2001: Driver of the Year, Mark Hall; Truck of the Year, Executioner
- 2002: Driver of the Year, Mark Hall; Truck of the Year, Raminator Rookie of the Year, Dale Benear - Rammunition
- 2003: Driver of the Year, Mark Hall; Truck of the Year, Raminator
- 2004: Truck of the Year, Raminator; Rookie of the Year, Geremie Dishman - Rammunition; Mechanic of the Year, Tim Hall; Most Improved, Dale Benear & Travis Howard - Rammunition
- 2005: Driver of the Year, Mark Hall; Truck of the Year, Raminator; Safety Award, Tim Hall
- 2006: Driver of the Year, Mark Hall; Truck of the Year, Raminator; Safety Award, Kyle Doyle; Most Improved Team Award, Rammunition; Mechanic of the Year, Tim Hall;

=== ProMT ===
- Series Champion - 2002, 2004

=== Special Events ===
- Series Champion - 2001 (Executioner), 2002, 2003, 2004, 2005, 2006, 2009, 2010, 2012, 2013, 2014

=== Monster Nationals ===
- Series Champion - 2003, 2004, 2005, 2006, 2007 (fastest clinch of the title in the series history), 2013, 2014

== See also ==
- Monster Truck
- List of Monster Trucks
