= Bear Foot =

Monster truck

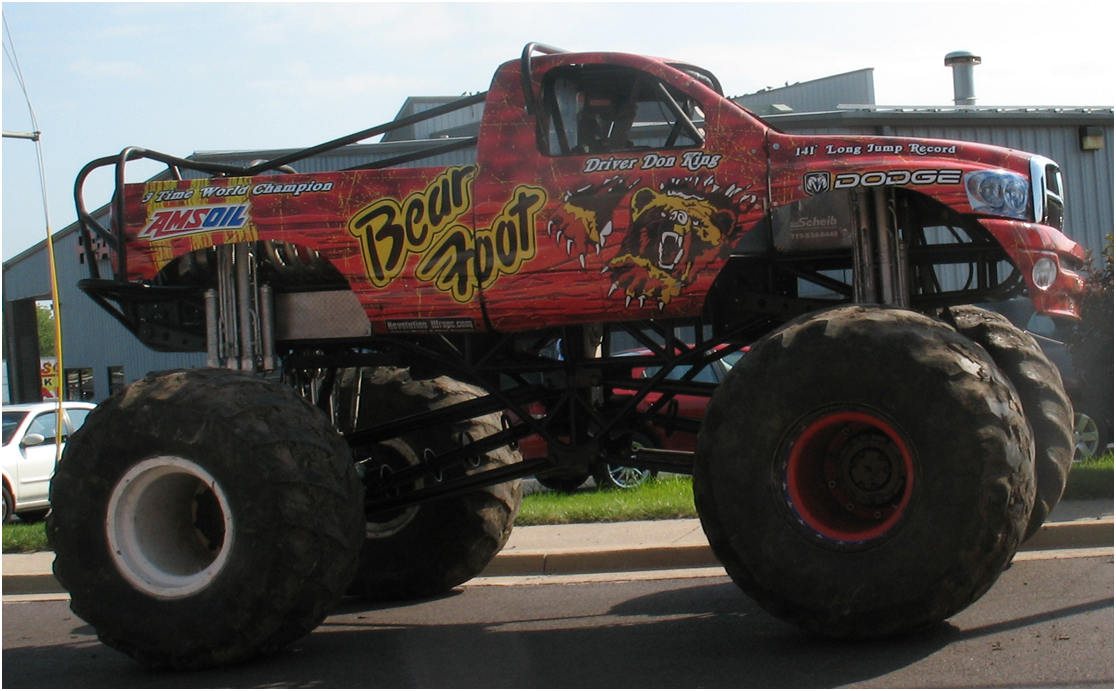

Owner and driver information
- Owner: Triple B Motorsports
- Driver(s): TBA
- Home city: St. Cloud, MN

Truck information
- Year created: 1979
- Body style: 2007 Dodge Ram
- Chassis: PEI XT3
- Engine: 525ci Chevrolet Big Block
- Transmission: FTI
- Tires: 2nd Generation BKT

Bear Foot is a monster truck currently owned by James Trantina of Triple B Motorsports. It was originally built by Jack Wilman and Fred Shafer and, along with Bigfoot and USA-1 was one of the first monster trucks. It won the 1990, 1992, and 1993 USHRA Camel Mud and Monsters championships. Originally a Chevrolet, it became a Dodge in 1992 as a result of a factory sponsorship which lasted until 1997. Shortly thereafter, the truck was sold to Paul Shafer (no relation to Fred) and Fred retired from the sport at the age of 50. In 2022, Paul would sell Bear Foot with the rest of his operation to James Trantina after not competing under its own team since 2008.

The truck was, for a long time, the primary rival of Bigfoot, and their meetings were heavily promoted. Under Paul Shafer's ownership, the truck primarily competed under his own promotion until his body being shelved.

In 2011, Fred Shafer was inducted into the International Monster Truck Hall of Fame.

On January 27, 2022, Paul Shafer's operation including Bear Foot was sold to James Trantina of Triple B Motorsports.

In 1985, the truck appeared in the music video for ZZ Top's single "Sleeping Bag", as well as appearing along with the smaller "Lil' Bear Foot" on an episode of Knight Rider. Bear Foot also starred in a 1990 commercial for Volvo, although the ad campaign was pulled.

== See also ==
- Monster Truck
- List of Monster Trucks
