= Gary Porter =

Gary Porter may refer to:

- Gary Porter (driver), American monster-truck driver
- Gary Porter (footballer) (born 1966), English footballer
- Gary Porter (American football), American football player
- Gary Porter (rugby union) (born 1996), South African rugby union player
- Gary Porter, Baron Porter of Spalding, British politician
