= Take This Job and Shove It (film) =

1981 film by Gus Trikonis

- Directed by: Gus Trikonis
- Screenplay by: Barry Schneider
- Story by: Jeffrey Bernini; Barry Schneider
- Based on: "Take This Job and Shove It" by David Allan Coe
- Produced by: Paul Baratta (associate producer); Greg Blackwell (producer); William J. Immerman (executive producer); Al Kasha (associate producer); J. David Marks (executive producer)
- Starring: Robert Hays; Art Carney; Barbara Hershey; David Keith; Tim Thomerson; Martin Mull; Eddie Albert; Penelope Milford; David Allan Coe
- Cinematography: James Devis
- Edited by: Richard Belding
- Music by: Billy Sherrill
- Production company: Cinema Group Ventures
- Distributed by: Avco Embassy Pictures
- Release date: May 15, 1981
- Running time: 100 minutes
- Country: United States
- Language: English
- Budget: $3.8 million
- Box office: $17,569,030 (US)

Take This Job and Shove It is a 1981 American comedy film directed by Gus Trikonis and starring Robert Hays, Barbara Hershey, Art Carney, and David Keith.

The film was named after a popular country song, "Take This Job and Shove It", which was written by David Allan Coe and sung by Johnny Paycheck; both men had minor roles in the film.

== Plot ==
A corporate conglomerate called "The Ellison Group" acquires four breweries, all of them experiencing financial trouble. Enter Frank Macklin, a young manager hired by Ellison to help reorganize one of the ailing breweries, a major employer in his home town. Initially his old friends, who work at the brewery, give him a cold welcome as they think he'll be unable to revitalize the brewery. But when Frank informs them that the brewery is drowning in red ink, and that they may be losing their jobs soon, they welcome him with open arms, and ramp up the brewery's sales and production. The brewery improves so much that the Ellison Group decides to sell it to a Texas oil millionaire, who doesn't know the first thing about running a brewery or — apparently — running a business.

== Cast ==
- Robert Hays as Frank Macklin
- Art Carney as Charlie Pickett
- Barbara Hershey as J.M. Halsted
- David Keith as Harry Meade
- Tim Thomerson as Ray Binkowski
- Martin Mull as Dick Ebersol
- Eddie Albert as Samuel Ellison
- Penelope Milford as Lenore Meade
- David Allan Coe as Mooney
- Lacy J. Dalton as Mrs. Mooney
- Royal Dano as Beeber
- Virgil Frye as Cleach
- James Karen as Loomis
- Len Lesser as Roach
- Suzanne Kent as Charmaine
- Joan Prather as Madelyn
- George Lindsey as semitruck driver
- Johnny Paycheck as Man with hamburger
- Charlie Rich as Hooker
- Fran Ryan as Mrs. Hinkle
- Robert Swan as Virgil
- Stephan Meyers as Harry Meade, Jr.
- Bob Chandler as the race flagman

== Production ==
Most of the film was shot in Dubuque, Iowa, and the Dubuque Star Brewery; some minor scenes were shot in Minneapolis, Minnesota. The Dubuque Star Brewery still stands today in the same location. It has been renovated and is now a private bar and grill.

=== Bigfoot ===
Take This Job and Shove It was the first film to feature monster trucks. Bob Chandler's Bigfoot #1 is seen throughout the movie as Ray's pick-up truck. Everett Jasmer's USA-1, credited as "Thunderin' Lightning", is the blue truck at the starting line that (in the script) breaks down when the race starts. Jasmer's daily delivery truck was used as the rival truck to Bigfoot, known as Silver Bullet. Both trucks are shown with 48-inch tires that were the then-standard monster truck tire (as opposed to the 66-inch tires that became standard later). Bob Chandler is seen as the flagman at the beginning of the race, and his family can be seen throughout the picnic sequences.

== Release ==
The film was released by Avco Embassy in the United States on May 15, 1981, and became somewhat of a sleeper hit. The film's final box office total was $17,569,027. Rentals were $7.3 million.

== See also ==
- List of American films of 1981
