= Video Power =

American television series

- Created by: Allen J. Bohbot
- Presented by: Stivi Paskoski; Terry Lee Torok
- Starring: Michael Donovan; Lee Jeffrey; Terry Klassen; Jason Michas; Richard Newman; John Novak; Dale Wilson
- Country of origin: United States
- No. of seasons: 2
- No. of episodes: 83

Production
- Running time: 30 minutes
- Production companies: Saban Entertainment; Acclaim Entertainment; Bohbot Entertainment

Original release
- Network: Syndication
- Release: 1990 – 1992

Video Power is an American television series that aired in two different formats from 1990 to 1992 in syndication. Both formats revolved around video games, and actor Stivi Paskoski presided over both series playing video game master Johnny Arcade.

Allen J. Bohbot (CEO and Founder of Bohbot Entertainment) was the co-creator and co executive producer of Video Power with Saban Entertainment's founder as well Video Power creator and executive producer himself Haim Saban, along with Shuki Levy and Winston Richard. The series was taped in New York City at Kaufman Astoria Studios.

== First format (Season 1) ==
The first format of Video Power consisted of both live-action segments and cartoon segments from the Acclaim Entertainment-produced series, The Power Team. The cartoon was an adventure featuring Johnny Arcade and a team of heroes from different NES games and a Game Boy game published by Acclaim: Max Force, a policeman from NARC; Kuros, the knight from Wizards and Warriors; Tyrone, a basketball player from Arch Rivals; Kwirk, a tomato from the game of the same name; and Bigfoot, a monster truck that had its own video game. The main enemy of each episode was mostly Mr. Big and his thugs, Joe Rockhead and Dr. Spike Rush, from NARC. Outside of the crime factor, Malkil from Wizards and Warriors sometimes appeared, and was a much more sophisticated and intelligent villain. One episode did have the villains from NARC fighting the Power Team, who were suddenly interrupted by the appearance of Malkil. Mr. Big fails to understand magic, but elects to forge an alliance with Malkil to try to get rid of the Power Team.

In the live action segments, Stivi Paskoski, in character, would review and preview games that were currently out or forthcoming for consoles. When giving hints and tips for gamers that were having trouble achieving certain tasks in games, he would end the tip giving segment with the phrase, "and that's the Video Power Edge!". Sometimes he would go to an expo or a convention to show the booths of forthcoming titles. Viewers were also able to write into the show to receive hints.

== Second format (Season 2) ==
For the show's second season which began in the fall of 1991, the producers of Video Power completely overhauled its format and turned it into a game show. Paskoski was joined by Terry Lee Torok, a former Nintendo of America employee who also was the MC at many Nintendo events, including the Nintendo World Championships, who was officially the show's co-host but performed much of the actual hosting duties himself. An in-house band was also added and led by keyboardist Steve Treccase, who had previously been on the MTV game show Remote Control.

=== Gameplay ===
==== Round 1: "Johnny on the Spot" ====
Torok would go into the audience for this first segment after introducing Johnny Arcade, searching for four pre-chosen children to ask Johnny questions (he called this "putting the spot on Johnny by putting Johnny on the spot"). All the questions were game related and Johnny would almost always have the correct answer. In the event that he did not know the answer (an excuse was always prepared for those instances), the audience would yell out "stump, stump, stump" and the child would receive a prize. The four audience members chosen served as that day's players.

==== Round 2: Video game playing ====
The four players began by playing an elimination round, where they were given 2:02 to play an NES game or rarely a different game system (on some shows, the time limits were 1:01 and 1:41). The two players with the highest "score", which varied based on the game that was being played, advanced to the next round.

The scores, as noted above, were tallied in various ways. For example, when playing Bases Loaded 3, the two winners would be the players who had scored the most runs within the time limit. If no runs were scored, then the winners were based on how many balls versus strikes were called against the contestant. When playing Little Nemo: The Dream Master, the scoring was based on how many keys were picked up and, if that resulted in a tie, how "far" in the level the contestants reached.

==== Round 3: Quiz ====
The two remaining players at this stage of the game were given a "Power Vest" and a "Power Helmet" to wear (both of which were completely covered with Velcro). Johnny would then ask the contestants some video game trivia questions. Each question was a toss-up, meaning players had to buzz in to answer. Answering a question correctly earned points, which were represented by various Velcro-backed items. If a player buzzed in and answered incorrectly, however, the other player would receive three multiple-choice answers to help them answer the question. If neither player rang in before a set time limit, Johnny would reveal the multiple choice answers but there was only one chance for the question to be answered.

Three 10-point questions, represented by slices of pizza, were asked in each round, with one being an audio question where the players had to identify a game based on a piece of music that was played in studio from it. A 20-point question, represented by a mushroom, was also asked, and a fifth question (added partway through the year) earned the player a video game as a prize for answering it.

==== Round 4: Video game playing ====
After the quiz portion, the two players faced off against each other in one final video game for 1:01. As before, the object was to get a higher score within the time limit. Whoever did so earned a 50-point star icon, and the player that was ahead at the end of the last game playing round was declared the winner. If the score was tied, the person who had the highest score in the first video game playing round wins.

==== Prize round ====
The winning player played a bonus game called the "Prize Round". The player had 41 seconds (originally 30 seconds) to run through a maze with various video games and other items stuck to its walls with hook-and-loop fastener. A player could grab whatever they wanted, which they then stuck to their Power Helmet or Power Vest, and exited the maze through a giant tube slide. Although a player technically did not win the round if they did not exit the maze before the time limit expired, this rule was often disregarded and players would be allowed to exit with whatever was stuck to them, but they could not grab any more prize items. Anything the player had stuck to them when the run was finished was theirs to keep. There was also a "secret game" hidden somewhere in the Prize Round maze; the winner would be told its location and if the game was found the player won a bonus prize (such as a Neo Geo). Also, there were several sacks containing multiple games placed in the maze which a player was able to grab during their run.

==== Other format notes ====
In addition to earning a bonus round trip, each day's winner earned the right to come back on Friday to face off against the other three winners from the week. Whoever won on this episode won a larger prize such as a console. The Friday winners got to play in an ultimate tournament held on a special week, where Friday winners, along with wild card winners, dueled it out. Whoever won that ultimate tournament won a trophy, a trip to Universal Studios Hollywood and a $10,000 scholarship.
