= Predator (truck) =

Monster truck team

Predator, Prowler, Pouncer, and Lone Eagle
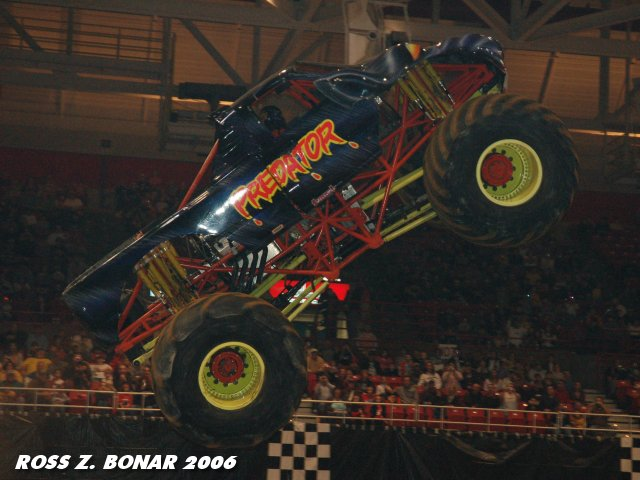

Owner and driver information
- Owner: Allen Pezo
- Driver(s): Allen Pezo, Dave Pezo, Brandon Pezo, Larry Jaruzel, Dale Mitchell, Lenny Kuilder
- Home city: Nashville, TN

Truck information
- Year created: 1988
- Body style: Experimental Panther (based on 2002 Chevy)
- Engine: 557 CI Keith Black Hemi

Predator Racing, Inc. is a monster truck team consisting of the trucks Predator, Prowler, Pouncer and Lone Eagle all of which currently compete primarily on the USHRA Monster Jam circuit. The team is owned by Allen Pezo, and includes Pezo, Larry Jaruzel, Lenny Kuilder and Dale Mitchell as drivers. The trucks are famous for their "cat" designs, with the trucks modeled after a panther, tiger, and leopard, respectively. The team also occasionally runs a conventional Dodge Ram by the name of Lone Eagle.

== History ==
Allen Pezo built his first monster truck, the original Lone Eagle, out of a brand-new 1985 Chevrolet Silverado at the age of 15. After campaigning this truck, and another truck known as White Knight, for several years, he rebodied Lone Eagle and named it Predator. The truck originally started out as a 1988 Chevrolet Silverado that was on the former Lone Eagle chassis. The second Predator was an all new truck, also a Chevy Silverado. The chassis was painted yellow, but cosmetically the truck was a duplicate of the original truck. This truck was later converted to a race truck, with 12" shocks, was sold and became Radioactive. Near the end of the 1980s, Allen bought an M42 tank and converted it into the competition vehicle, Predator Trax.

The third Predator was Pezo's first "stage three" monster truck, and featured a four-link suspension, mid-mounted engine, and a new pink chassis and neon colored body. This chassis ;;(7678( also ran as Hyperactive, whenever Pezo had Predator 4 and 3 at the same event. This truck was sold and is now running independent events as "Terminator".

Prowler in Cape Girardeau, MO

In 1993, Pezo second stage three monster truck was the first panther design Predator. This chassis was one of the first Patrick Enterprises Incorporated chassis that Dan Patrick didn't build for Bigfoot 4x4. Alan modified the chassis by adding a front-facing four-link suspension, which allowed the front tires to push the chassis, like the rear tires. The new body design and image was created for the Monster Wars television show. Although Predator had made several television appearances before this point, it was Monster Wars which put Pezo in the national spotlight for the first time. After being sold, the chassis was reacquired by the team in 2003 and now runs as both Predator and Lone Eagle.

Pezo's fifth Predator is a production Patrick chassis. The truck debuted in 1995 with a cantilever rear suspension, but was quickly changed to a more conventional straight-shock setup the next year. In 1999, a second Patrick chassis, identical to the first, debuted, with the new Prowler body. This truck was created to be a travelling partner to Predator, however it can "wear" the Predator body if necessary. Both Predator and Prowler have been Monster Jam World Finalists, with Predator most recently competing in the 2006 finals. Also in 2006, the team debuted a third identity called Pouncer, which was designed by Hot Wheels and typically runs as an alternate body for the Prowler chassis.

For the 2007 season, Allen built a brand-new Predator. The truck is similar to the others, utilizing Clark planetaries, an Aries engine, SCS transfer case and F-106 housings. Unlike the other three trucks Alan currently owns, the truck has one 4" Knight stalker shock on each corner, and is loosely based on Grave Digger 19 and 20. The truck also sports a paint scheme that resembles the Hotwheels die cast of Predator.

== Hallmarks ==
Pezo is known as one of the best freestylers in the sport. He excels at keeping up momentum and performing huge jumps. Typically, he is also able to finish the run with his truck intact, although he does perform stunts which have a high degree of danger. One of his most famous moments is when Pezo was racing in the New Orleans Superdome. Pezo got massive air and the truck landed on its rear end. It was such a hard impact that it damaged the floor. His cartwheel crashes in Jacksonville, Florida in 2004 and Indianapolis, Indiana in 2005 were among the most spectacular moments of their respective years. Prowler/Pouncer drivers Larry Jaruzel, Dale Mitchell, and Lenny Kuilder are less spectacular and more consistent, but still post high scores often. The Predator team also has the reputation of being formidable racing opponents.

In 2013, Allen Pezo was the 13th person to be inducted into the International Monster Truck Hall of Fame.

== Awards ==
=== Predator ===
- Monster Jam World Finals Qualifier - 2000, 2001, 2002, 2006

=== Prowler ===
- Monster Jam World Finals Qualifier - 2000

== See also ==
- Monster truck
- List of monster trucks
