= The Power Team (TV series) =

- Created by: Bohbot Entertainment
- Starring: Michael Donovan; Lee Jeffrey; Terry Klassen; Jason Michas; Richard Newman; John Novak; Dale Wilson
- Country of origin: United States
- No. of episodes: 40

Production
- Running time: 15 minutes
- Production companies: Saban Entertainment; Bohbot Entertainment

Original release
- Release: 1990 – 1991

The Power Team is an American animated series that aired as a segment of the video game reviewing show Video Power during the show's first season. The cartoon is a crossover between various video games published by Acclaim Entertainment, and was produced by Bohbot and Saban Entertainment.

== Premise ==
The cartoon show featured characters from five different console video games published by Acclaim Entertainment. They included Max Force from NARC, Kuros from the Wizards & Warriors series (originally created by Rare), Kwirk from the eponymous Game Boy title, Tyrone from Arch Rivals and Bigfoot from the game of the same name. The cartoon show also featured a cartoon version of the host of Video Power, Johnny Arcade, as they fought against villains from the Acclaim lineup, mainly Mr. Big and his henchmen Spike Rush and Joe Rockhead from NARC, although Malkil from Wizards & Warriors or Kwirk's enemies from his own game occasionally appeared as well.

A common device on the show was the characters trying to recover the "game paks" from Mr. Big which would send them home. Mr. Big would actually use the Game Paks to try to blast the characters back home during their battles. The heroes' rationale was that they needed to thwart Mr. Big. In one episode where Kuros was sent home, the other teammates had been along with him, and Kuros explained that he must return to the real world as he was now part of a team, and could not go home for good until the other members could safely go home as well. During battles, Johnny would use a special communication device that looked like an NES Advantage controller to direct the Power Team members from his room.

=== Characters ===
A few of the characters underwent radical redesigns from their game incarnations: Max Force, for example, looked like a SWAT officer and had a utility belt instead of machine guns, and Kuros bore more resemblance to a barbarian (as Kuros was depicted on the Wizards & Warriors box art), especially the original He-Man, than a knight in armor. Tyrone was given a small afro, likely so he would not resemble Michael Jordan as much as his Arch Rivals counterpart. Mr. Big more closely resembled his game counterpart, but he did not use a wheelchair and did not have a "second form", instead of using cigar-related gadgets and weapons ("cigar missiles", for example). Secondary villain Malkil did not look like the stereotypical wizard of the games, although his depiction remained true to form by wearing a skullcap, robes, and a forked beard, which gave him a sinister, albeit regal appearance.

== Episode list ==
=== Season 1 ===
1. "Yes We Have No Tomatoes"
2. "Treasure of Bangladar"
3. "Hooray for Hollyweird"
4. "New Gang in Town"
5. "Burnt Rubber"
6. "Speedway Assault"
7. "Turf Wars"
8. "Big Footenstein"
9. "It Came to Millburg"
10. "Pull the Plug"
11. "Deaf Ears"
12. "Back to the Game World"
13. "Tunnel Radish"
14. "Rigged Deal"
15. "Criss Cross Double Cross"
16. "The Day Johnny Stayed After School"
17. "Train Game"
18. "Video Virus"
19. "A Man and His Belt"
20. "Slice & Dice"
21. "The Bride of Mr. Big"
22. "Whose Game World Is This Anyway?"
23. "Ski Patrol"
24. "The Greatest Heist of All"
25. "The Golden Joystick"
26. "Bums"

=== Season 2 ===
1. "On the Ball"
2. "Bust The Buster"
3. "Who's Fueling Who"
4. "Oil's Well That Ends Well"
5. "Mr. Really Big"
6. "The Big Payoff"
7. "The Runaway"
8. "Tut Tut"
9. "Water Water Everywhere"

== Development ==
The show seemed intended to capitalize on the audiences of Captain N: The Game Master, a co-production between DIC and Nintendo, but instead of having the protagonist getting transported into an alternate world filled with video game heroes, The Power Team took the opposite tack by having the game characters come to the "real world".

Max Force's design was changed for the cartoon, due to the mature tone of the original game.

While there were 33 episodes in the first season of Video Power, only 26 episodes of The Power Team were produced. As a result, some episodes of The Power Team would be aired more than once. The Power Team segments were re-edited and repackaged as a stand-alone show after Video Power underwent a format change for its second season. The Power Team was directed by Steven Martiniere and Jack Olesker was the developer and story editor.

The cartoon series was produced by Bohbot Entertainment with Saban Entertainment.
