= Dan Runte =

American monster truck driver (died 2025)

Dan Runte (1964 or 1965 – September 5, 2025) was an American monster truck driver. He was best known as the driver of the Bigfoot monster truck, winning a Guinness World Record for the longest monster truck jump, with the record of 144 ft (44 m).

According to The Birmingham News, he was a five-time monster truck champion. He died on September 5, 2025 after an SUV hit his motorcycle.
