= Ford F-Series (sixth generation) =

Sixth generation of the Ford F-Series pickup trucks

Sixth generation
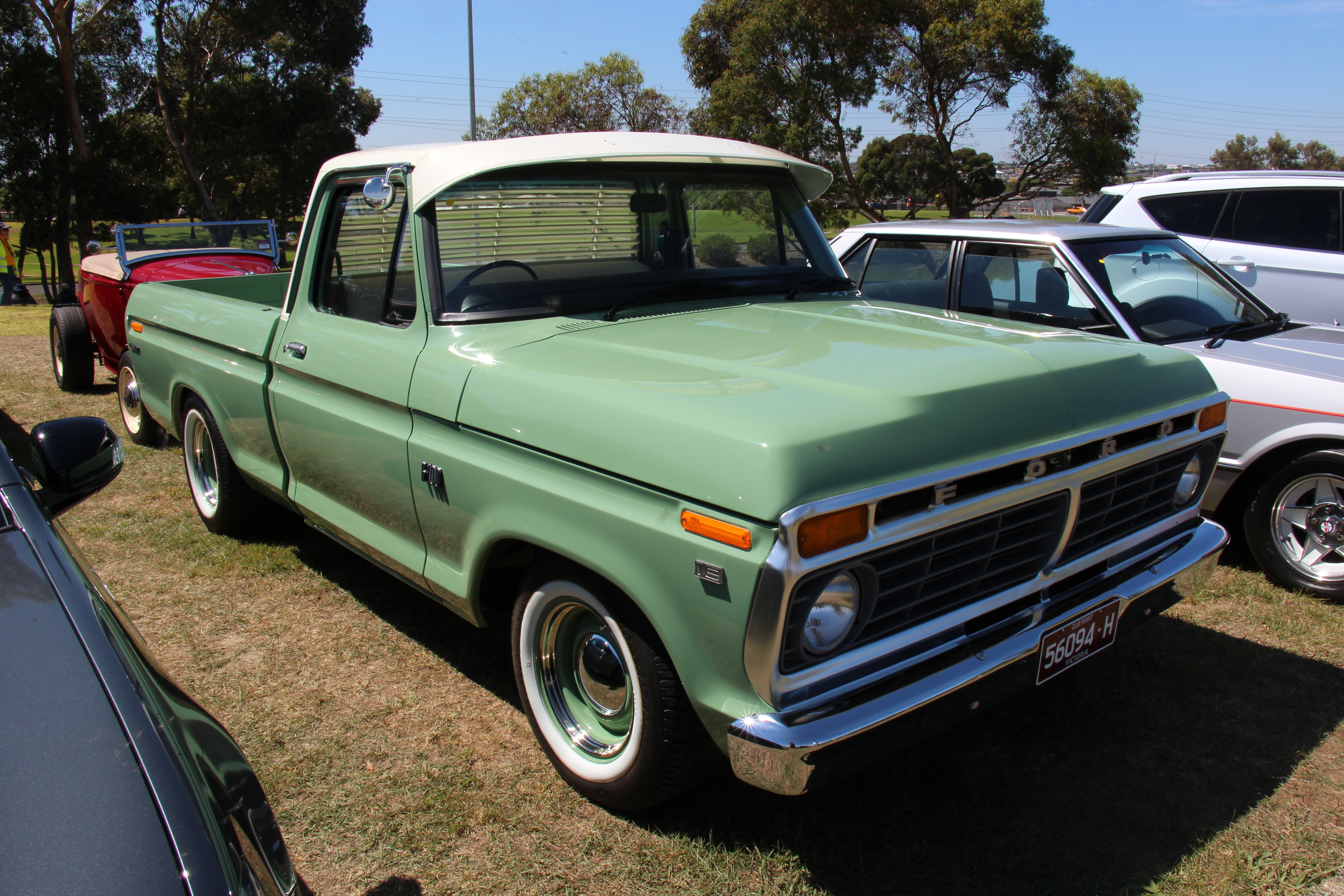
- 1974 F-100

Overview
- Manufacturer: Ford
- Production: 1972–1979 (USA); 1973–1979 (Mexico, Australia and Venezuela); 1974–1980 (Argentina, F-100, F-250, F-600 and F-700); 1974–1981 (Argentina, F-350)
- Model years: 1973–1979
- Assembly: Dearborn, Michigan, USA; Edison, New Jersey, USA; Kansas City, Missouri, USA; Louisville, Kentucky, USA; Norfolk, Virginia, USA; San Jose, California, USA; St. Paul, Minnesota, USA; Wayne, Michigan, USA; Cuautitlan, Mexico; General Pacheco, Argentina (Ford Argentina); Oakville, Ontario, Canada (Ontario Truck Plant); Melbourne, Australia (Broadmeadows Assembly Plant, Ford Australia)

Body and chassis
- Class: Full-size pickup truck
- Body style: 2-door regular cab 2-door extended cab 4-door crew cab
- Layout: Front engine, rear-wheel / four-wheel drive
- Related: Ford Bronco; Ford F-500/F-600/F-700/F-800

Powertrain
- Engine: Petrol; 221 CID (3.6 L) Falcon I6 (F-100, Argentina); 240 CID (3.9 L) I6; 250 CID (4.1 L) I6 (1974-79, Australia); 292 CID (4.8 L) Fase II V8 (Argentine F-100/250/350/600); 300 CID (4.9 L) I6; 302 CID (5.0 L) Cleveland V8 (1974-79, Australia); 302 CID (5.0 L) small block V8; 351 CID (5.8 L) 351M V8; 351 CID (5.8 L) Cleveland V8 (1978-79, Australia); 360 CID (5.9 L) FE V8; 390 CID (6.4 L) FE V8; 400 CID (6.6 L) 335 V8; 460 CID (7.5 L) 385 V8; Diesel; 203 CID (3.3L) Perkins 4.203 I4 Diesel (F-100, Argentina)
- Transmission: 3-speed Ford C4 automatic 3-speed Ford C6 automatic 3-speed manual (column); 4-speed manual (floor)

Dimensions
- Wheelbase: 117.0 in (2,972 mm) - F-100 Regular Cab 6.75' box 133.0 in (3,378 mm) - F-100/150/250 Regular Cab 8' box 139.0 in (3,531 mm) - F-100/150/250 SuperCab 6.75' box 155.0 in (3,937 mm) - F-100/150/250/350 Crew Cab 8' box 140.0 in (3,556 mm) - F-350 Regular Cab 8' box 166.5 in (4,229 mm) - F-350 Crew Cab 8' box 137.0 in (3,480 mm) - F-350 Regular Cab 9' stake/platform 161.0 in (4,089 mm) - F-350 Regular Cab 12' stake/platform

Chronology
- Predecessor: Ford F-Series (fifth generation) (1967–1972)
- Successor: Ford F-Series (seventh generation) (1980–1986)

The sixth generation of the Ford F-Series, also known as the "dentside Ford" to enthusiasts, is a line of pickup trucks and medium-duty commercial trucks that were produced by Ford Motor Company from the 1973 to 1979 model years. Produced by Ford in North America, Argentina, and Australia, this is the third and final generation of trucks derived from the 1965 Ford F-Series.

The sixth generation marked several functional design changes and an expansion of the model line. For 1973, the regular cab F-350 became available with a wide "Styleside" bed for the first time. For 1974, a "SuperCab" extended cab pickup truck was introduced, between the two-door standard cab and the four-door crew cab. For 1975, the F-150 was introduced; a higher-payload version of the F-100 (intended to circumvent emissions standards), the F-150 would become the most popular version of the model line (ultimately replacing the F-100). A second generation of the Ford Bronco SUV was released for 1978 (after several years of delays) on a shortened F-100 chassis.

In 1977, the model line surpassed the Chevrolet C/K to become the best-selling truck in the United States, a position it has held ever since.

== Model history ==
This generation was launched in December 1972 for the 1973 model year. While retaining the same chassis of the previous generation, several revisions were made. To fight corrosion, Ford increased its use of galvanized sheet metal, zinc coated steel, and zinc-rich primer. To increase safety, the fuel tank was moved out of the cab (to below the pickup bed), creating a storage area behind the bench seat.

=== 1973–1975 ===
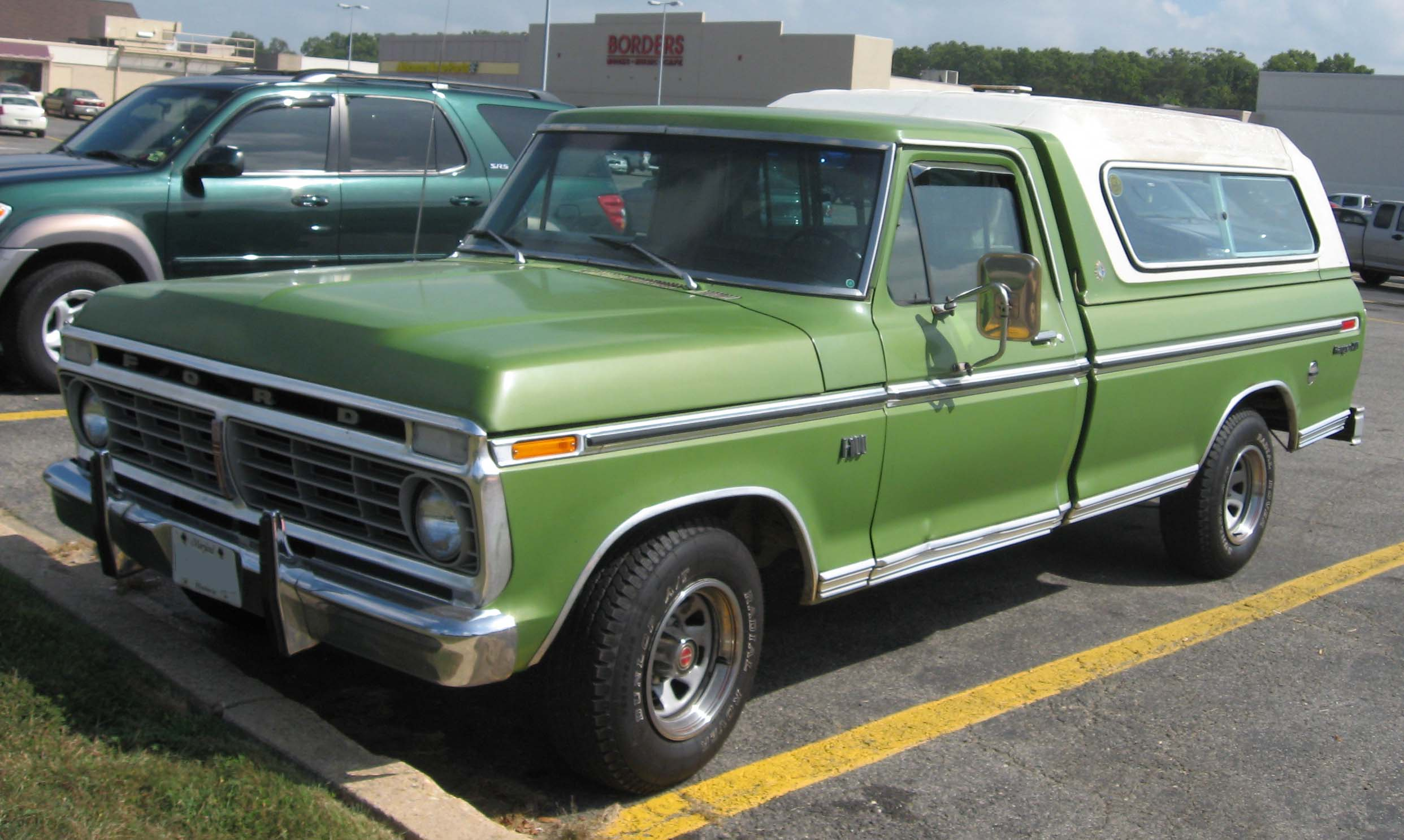
1973–1975 Ford F-100 XLT

For 1973, a new model was offered: The heavy duty F-350 V8. This was a new heavy-duty pickup made with contractors and camping enthusiasts in mind. It rode on a longer wheelbase than an F-100 or F-250 (140 in (3,556 mm) vs. 133 in (3,378 mm)) but had the same overall length. Ordering the Camper Special package for the F-350 SRW made it a "Super Camper Special", which was designed for the much heavier slide-in campers coming on the market at that time.

For 1974 (introduced September 21, 1973), the F-Series became available in an extended cab for the first time. Dubbed the "SuperCab", it offered the six-passenger seating of the crew cab in a shorter length, and competed with Dodge's Club Cab.

For 1975, the F-150 was introduced; this truck was designed with a heavier GVWR (over 6,000 lb (2,722 kg)) and maximum payload.

=== 1976–1977 ===
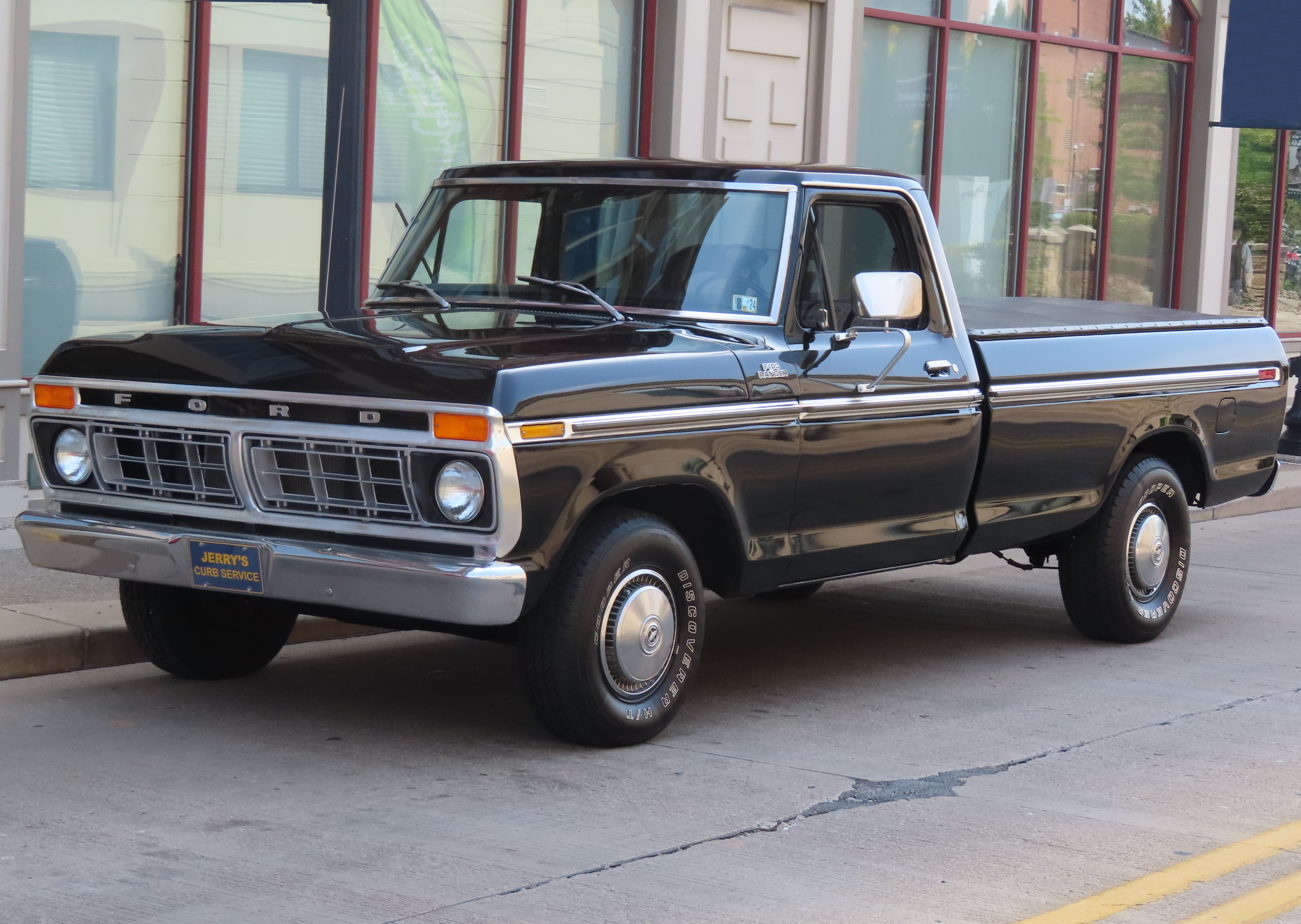
1977 Ford F-100 Ranger

In 1975 (1976 model year), this familiar "split-grille" design was given a slight facelift to feature black accents around the headlights and a refined overall appearance.

For the 1976 model year, a limited edition Bicentennial Option Group was offered on Custom styleside pickups, in either Wimbledon White or Bahama Blue, with a golden eagle stripe on the side, and red, white, and blue cloth inserts on the seats.

1977 models received a redesign of exterior trim, with the cowl insignias made smaller and moved near the windshield. The bed received a rectangular fuel door to conceal the gas cap. The fuel tank located behind the seat was discontinued due to safety concerns. It also would be the last year of the medium-duty F-500.

Starting in the 1977 model year Ford dropped the "Super" from "Super Camper Special" in favor of calling the F-350 models with camper packages "Camper Special", a name that was previously only assigned to F-250's with camper packages.

=== 1978–1979 ===
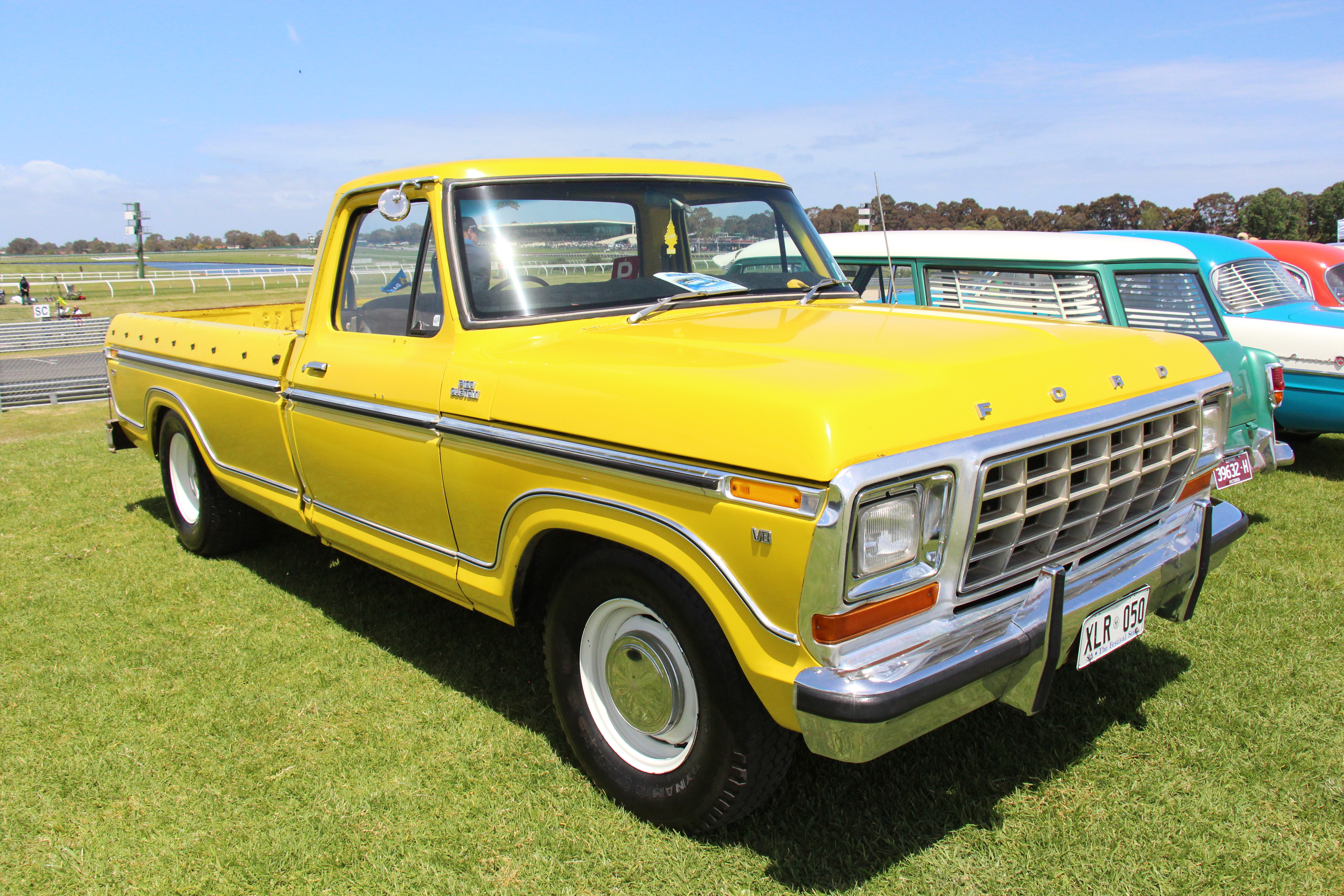
1979 Ford F-100 Custom, Australian-market version with right-hand drive

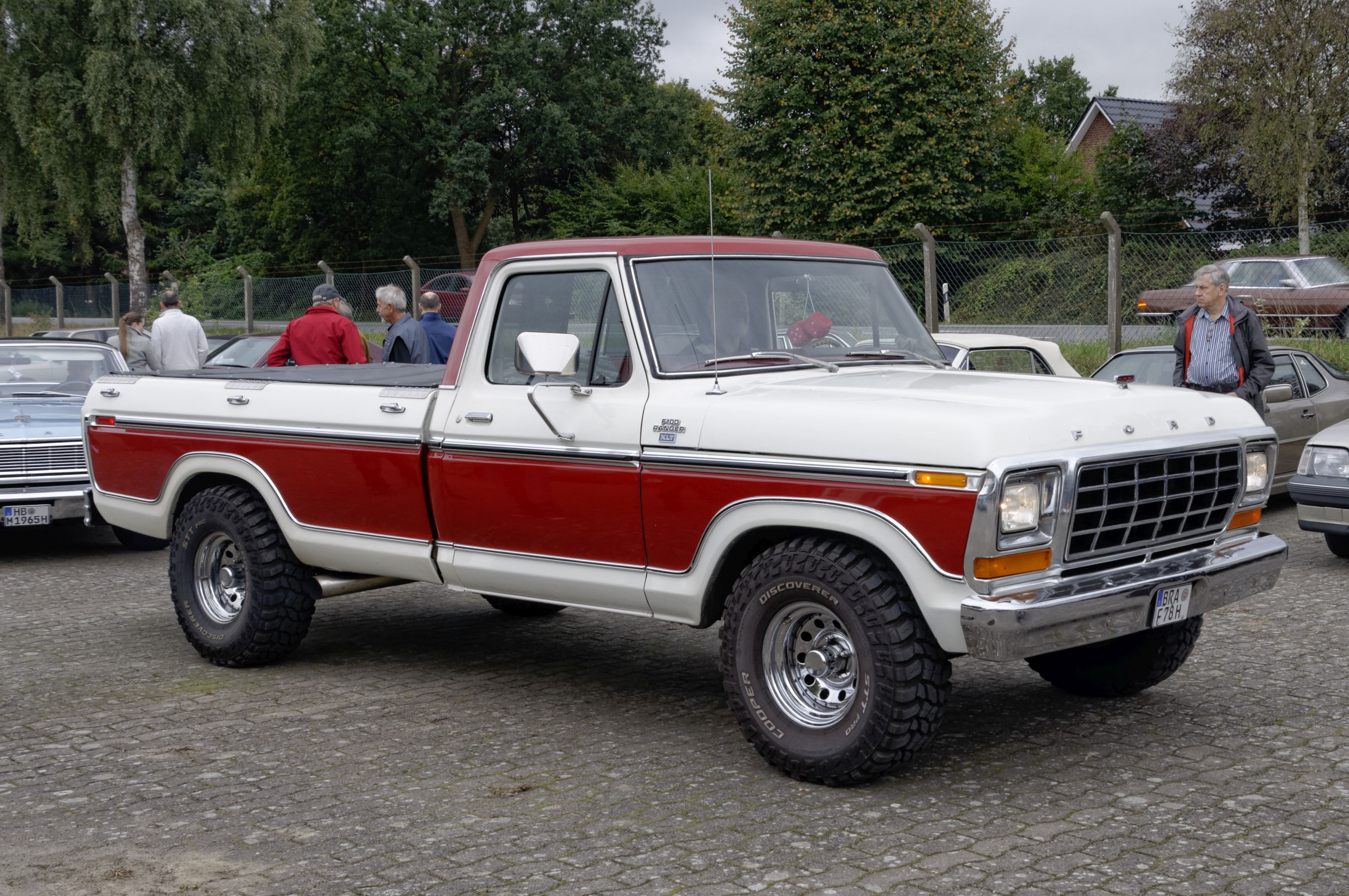
Ford F-100 Ranger XLT

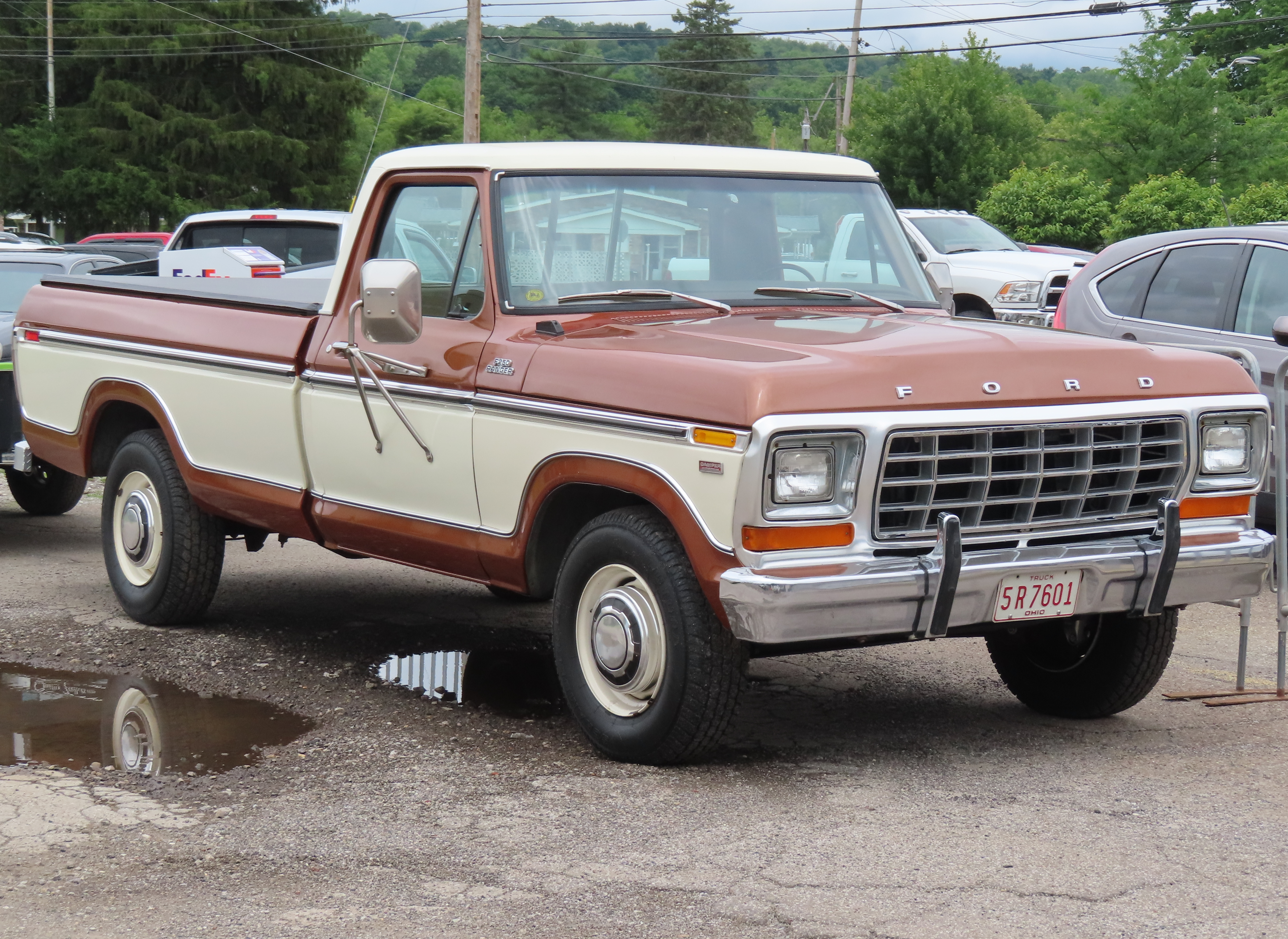
Ford F-250 Ranger Camper Special

For 1978, the split grille gave way to a larger single-piece item which no longer incorporated the headlamps, the turn signals, or the ford callout. The headlamps were located in housings outboard of the grille, with the turn signal lamps below them. A new chrome-plated ford callout was placed on the hood immediately above the grille. Round headlamps were used on the 1978 Custom trim level; the higher Ranger, Ranger XLT, and Ranger Lariat trim levels had new rectangular headlamps with optional chrome bezels and a chrome grille insert. Dual Fuel tanks in the bed became standard. New for 1978 was the option of part- or full-time four-wheel-drive on SuperCab models. Full-time four-wheel drive models had a chain-driven NP203 transfer case, while part-time four-wheel drive trucks were equipped with a gear-driven NP205.

For 1979, all models used the rectangular headlamps, with bezels available in either black or chrome to match the aluminum grille frame.

=== Models ===
Marketing name	Platform code(s)	Classification	GVWR
F100	F100: F101 F102 F103 F104 F105 F106 F107 F108 F109 F10N F110 (4x4): F111 F112 F113	1/2 ton	4,550–5,700 pounds 4x4: 5,250–6,500 pounds
F150	F151	"heavy" 1/2 ton	6,050–6,500 pounds
F250	F250: F251 F252 F253 F254 F255 F256 F257 F258 F259 F260 (4x4): F261 F262 F263 F264 F265 F266	3/4 ton	6,200–8,100 pounds 4x4: 6,500–8,400 pounds
F350	F350: F350 F351 F352 F353 F354 F355 F356 F357 F358 F359 F35P F360 (4x4): F360	1 ton	6,000–10,000 pounds 4x4: 8,550 pounds

The GVWR ratings for these trucks was tied to a combination of wheel, spring, axle and brake combinations. The series code on the ID tag denotes which model and from that it can be determined what weight rating each vehicle has. 4x4 trucks can also be identified by the Vehicle Identification Number and on the ID plate as a serial number. For example, F10 is an F-100 2-wheel drive, but F11 is an F-100 4x4, and so on. Serial numbers beginning with an "X" are SuperCab models.

=== Trim ===
The sixth generation F-Series underwent a slight revision of its trim lines. The base and Sport Custom trims were dropped (with Custom becoming the standard trim). The Ranger and Ranger XLT returned, with the Ranger Lariat trim introduced in 1978 with cloth interior trim, specific two-tone body and tailgate trim.

- Custom
- Ranger
- Ranger XLT
- Ranger Lariat (1978–1979)

The model line was offered with several appearance packages . For 1974, the Explorer package was offered on the F-100, F-250, and F-350 (and the Ranchero and Bronco), consisting of color-keyed exterior and interior trim, badging, and wheelcovers. The 1977-1979 "Free Wheeling" package (offered on the Custom and non-Lariat Rangers, along with the Bronco and Econoline), consisted of multi-colored tape stripes, silver or black interior, white-letter tires, and optional alloy wheels, bed-mounted roll bar, and bumper-mounted push bar.

=== Powertrain ===
Engine	Years	Power (SAE net)	Torque (SAE net)	Notes
240 CID Straight-6	1973–76			F-100 only
300 CID Straight-6	1973–79	117 hp (87 kW)		
302 CID small block V8	1973–79	130 hp (97 kW)		Only available in 2wd pickups
360 CID FE V8	1973–76	143 hp (107 kW)		
390 CID FE V8	1973–76	161 hp (120 kW)		Only available in 2wd pickups
460 CID 385 V8	1973–79	200–239 hp (150–162 kW)		Only available in 2wd pickups
351 CID 351M V8	1977–79	156 hp (116 kW)		
400 CID 400 V8	1977–79	169 hp (126 kW)		

== Production outside North America ==
=== Australia ===
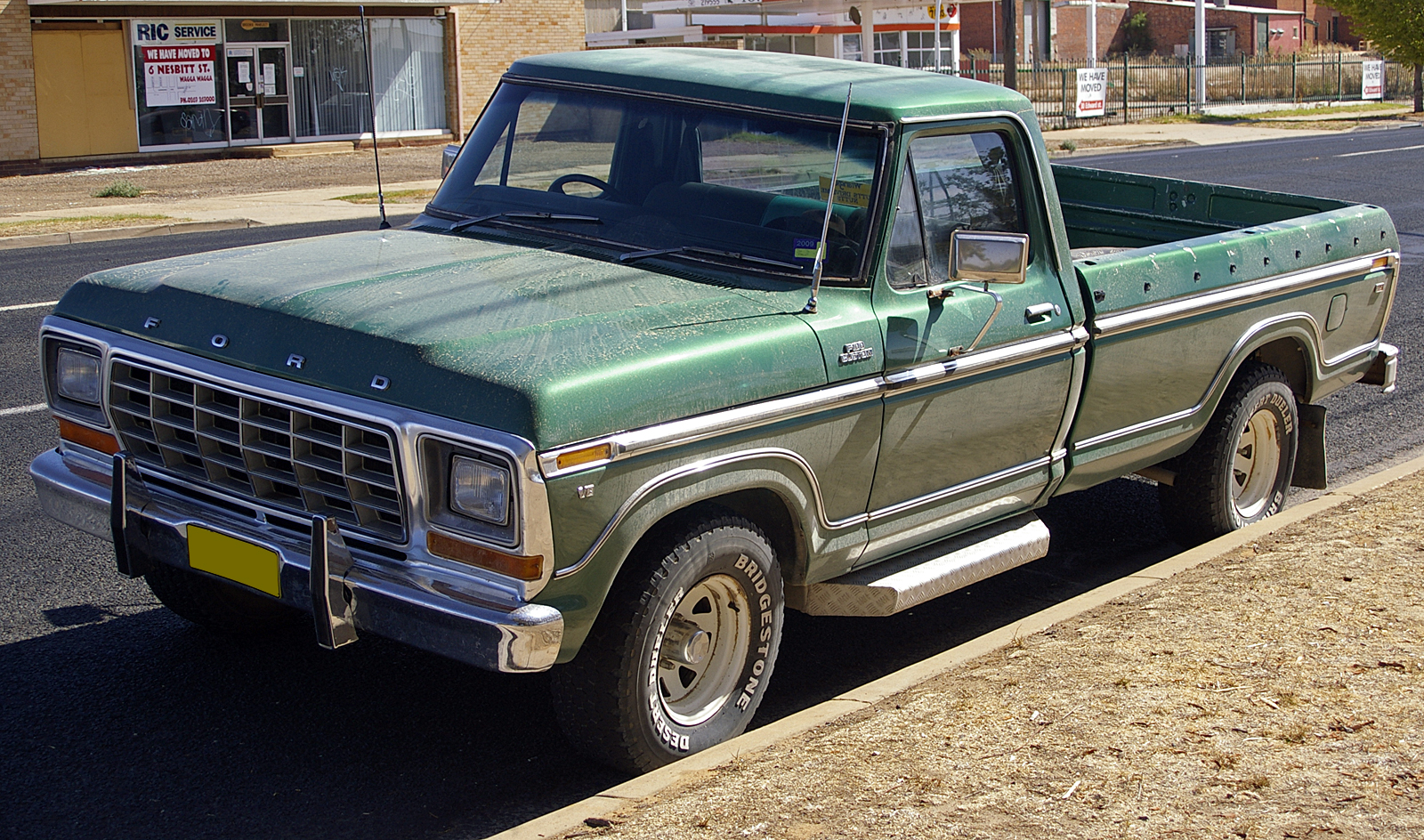
1978–79 Ford F-100 Custom XLT, with right-hand drive in Australia

Ford Australia assembled right-hand drive sixth generation F-Series that were fitted with a lineup of locally sourced engines. The base trim level was called Custom, with a higher spec XLT level only available on the F-100.

==== 1973–1975 ====
Initially they were available with US sourced 240 and 300 CID Straight-6 engines. From August 1974 the 240 CID engine was replaced with locally sourced 250 CID Straight-6 and the 300 CID was replaced by the locally sourced 302 Cleveland V-8 engines. The 302 Cleveland was a destroked 351 Cleveland built using tooling exported to Australia after the closure of the Cleveland production line. The F-100 with a 302 Cleveland model was the first Australian Sixth Gen to receive an automatic transmission as an option, the six cylinder powered models and the larger F-250 and F-350 were limited to a four-speed manual. The Canadian built 4x4 F-250 was added to the lineup in 1975 with the 300CID Straight-6 engine to supplement the locally assembled rear-wheel drive F-100, F-250 and F-350.

==== 1976–1977 ====
The 250CID Straight-6 was upgraded with a new crossflow head and rebadged as the 4.1 litre, increasing power and lowering emissions to meet new legislation being introduced in Australia. At some point during 1976, the GVM of the F-100 was quietly increased from 2,586 kg (5,701 lb) to 2,770 kg (6,107 lb) ahead of the release of the 1977 specs. In 1977, a locally assembled 4x4's F-100 with Australian built engines was added to the lineup to replace the fully imported 4x4 F-250.

==== 1978–1979 ====
In 1978, the 351 Cleveland V-8 replaced the 302 Cleveland V8 in the F-250 and F-350. The 302 Cleveland continued alongside the 351 Cleveland in the F-100. The 4.1 litre inline 6 cylinder continued to be sold across the range. In 1979, the 302 Cleveland was discontinued, leaving the standard engine as the 4.1 litre Straight-6, with the 351 Cleveland (badged as the 5.8), as the only upgrade, except the F-100 4x4's which was only available with the 5.8 Cleveland litre V8. The F-250 and F-350 had an automatic gearbox as an option for the first time in Australia, though still only on the V8 engine.

==== Powertrain details ====
Engine	Years	Power (SAE net)	Torque (SAE net)	Notes
240 CID Straight-6	1973–74			
250 CID Straight-6	1974–79	106 hp (79 kW) @ 3500 rpm in 1975	190 lb⋅ft (258 N⋅m) @ 1400 rpm in 1975	
300 CID Straight-6	1973–77	117 hp (87 kW)		F-250 4x4 only after 1974
302 CID Cleveland V8	1974–79	130 hp (97 kW) @ 4000 rpm in 1975	224 lb⋅ft (304 N⋅m) @ 2200 rpm in 1975	
351 CID Cleveland V8	1978–79			

=== Argentina ===
Ford Motor Argentina also produced the sixth-generation F-series, continuing production through 1982. The F-100 was offered as a pickup truck, with the F-350 chassis cab (the F-3500 was a diesel-engine version of the F-350).

Sharing its grille design with 1968-1972 American medium-duty trucks, Ford Motor Argentina offered the F-600/F-6000 (Ford 292 V8, Perkins 6-cylinder diesel) and the F-7000 (Perkins and Deutz 6-cylinder diesels) through 1983.

==== Powertrain details ====
The F-100 was available with three engine choices, the 221 CID "Econ" straight-six, the 292 CID Y-Block V8 and a 203 CID Perkins 4 cylinder and 6 cylinder diesel engines. The only transmission on offer was a 3-speed manual.

Engine	Years	Power (SAE gross)	Torque (SAE gross)	Notes
221 CID Straight-6		120 hp (89 kW) @ 4,000 rpm		Argentina Market
292 CID Y-block V8		160 hp (119 kW) @ 4,000 rpm		Argentina Market
203 CID Perkins I4		74 hp (55 kW) @ 2,800 rpm		Argentina Market

== Variants ==
=== Ford Bronco (1978-1979) ===
For 1978, after several years of delays, Ford released a second generation of the Ford Bronco. To compete directly against the Chevrolet K5 Blazer and the Dodge RamCharger, the Bronco grew in size, adopting a shortened F-100 4x4 chassis. While continuing the two-door wagon bodystyle of the previous generation (the most popular version), the 1978 Bronco adopted a half-cab/hardtop design (also used by the Blazer); the configuration was used through the 1996 model year.

Along with greater sales potential (the first-generation Bronco competed nearly exclusively against the International Scout), the redesign of the Bronco allowed for product commonality with the Ford F-100 (and the F-150 that eventually replaced it); for the next two decades, the two model lines would share nearly all exterior body panels from the front doors forward, many interior and trim panels, and would also have powertrain commonality. The 1978-1979 Bronco was fitted exclusively with four-wheel drive; the 351M V8 was standard, with the 400 V8 offered as an option.

=== Medium-duty F-Series ===
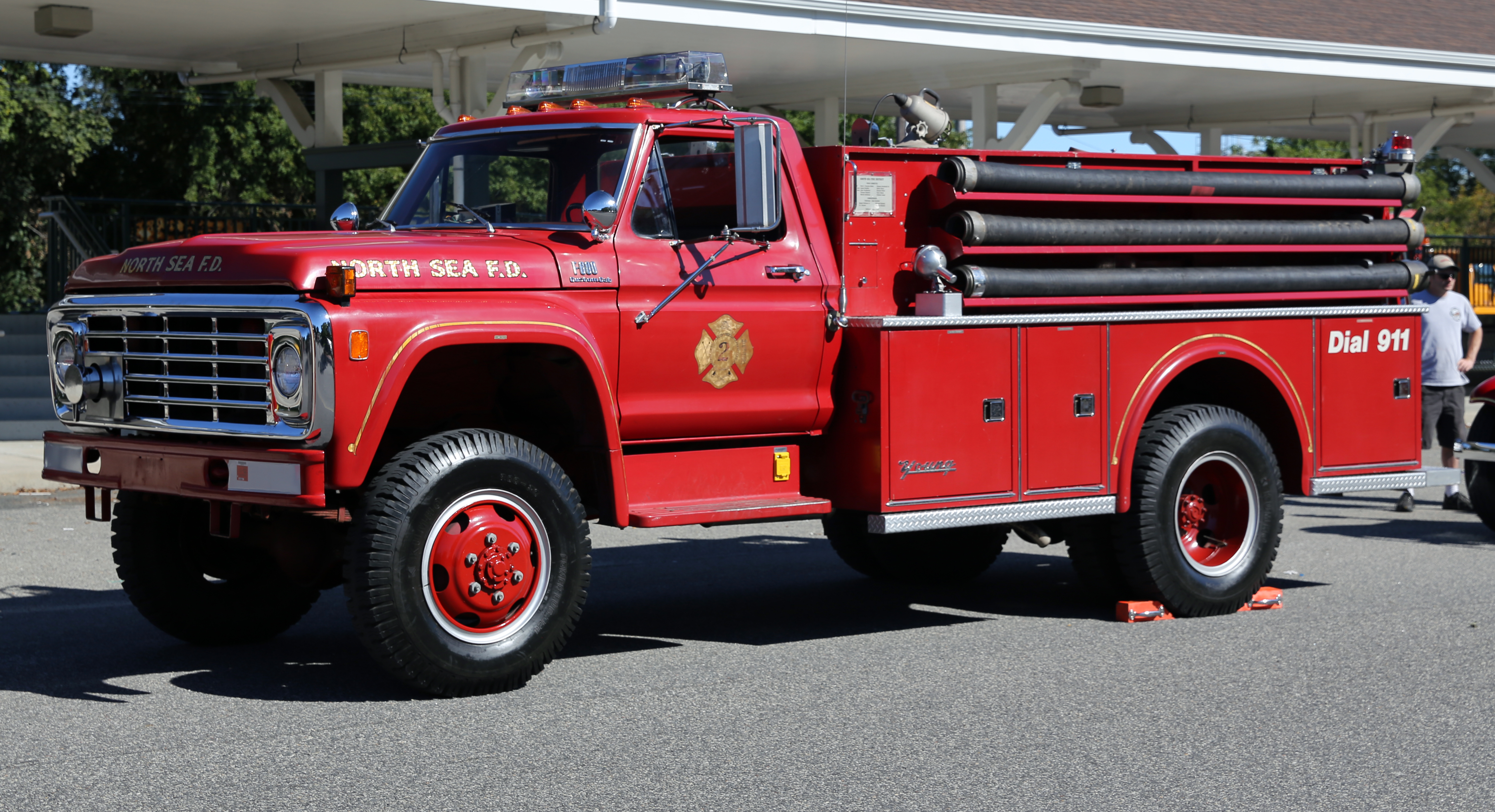
1976 Ford F600 Custom Cab is use as a fire truck pumper.

Redesigned for the 1967 model year, Ford medium-duty trucks saw little change throughout the 1970s. For 1973, the cab was changed to the new bodystyle alongside the light-duty trucks, and the grille was revised slightly; along with changing two sets of slots in the grille to four, and the headlight surrounds were increased in size. After 1977, Ford ended production of the lowest-GVWR F-500 series. Produced without bodywork aft of the firewall, the Ford B-series was a cowled chassis designed to be mated with bus bodies (primarily school buses).

The medium-duty F-series was offered with both gas and diesel engines. For 1977, the a 370 cubic-inch version of the 460 V8 replaced the previous FE-series gasoline V8 engines. Shared with the heavy-duty L-Series trucks, the Caterpillar 3208 V8 became an option in F700 and F800 models; diesel-powered trucks were distinguished by an extra "0" (i.e., F-7000/F-8000).

=== F-250 Highboy (1973-1977) ===
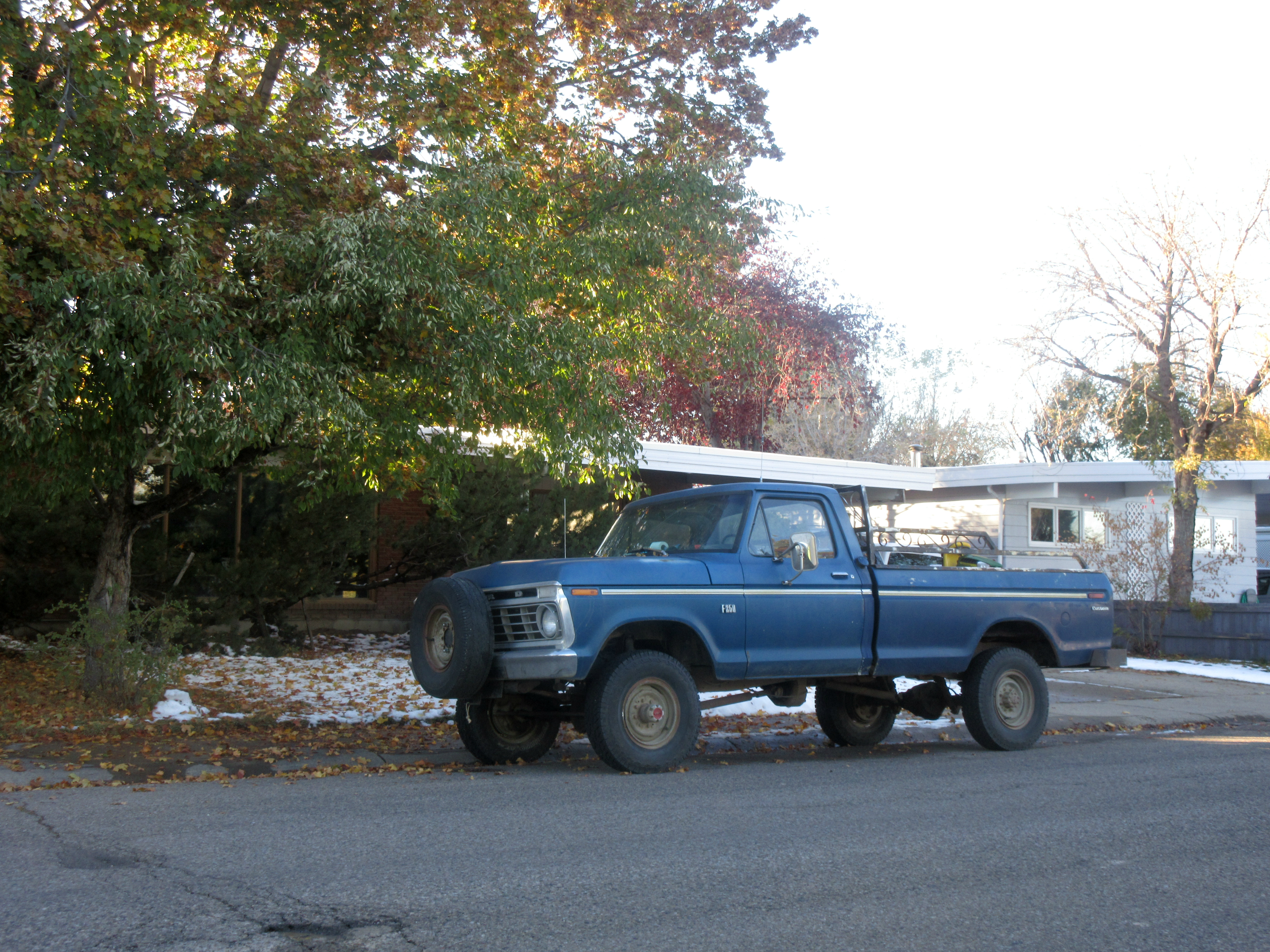
1973-1975 F-250 Ranger 4x4, note location of "divorced" transfer case below cab.

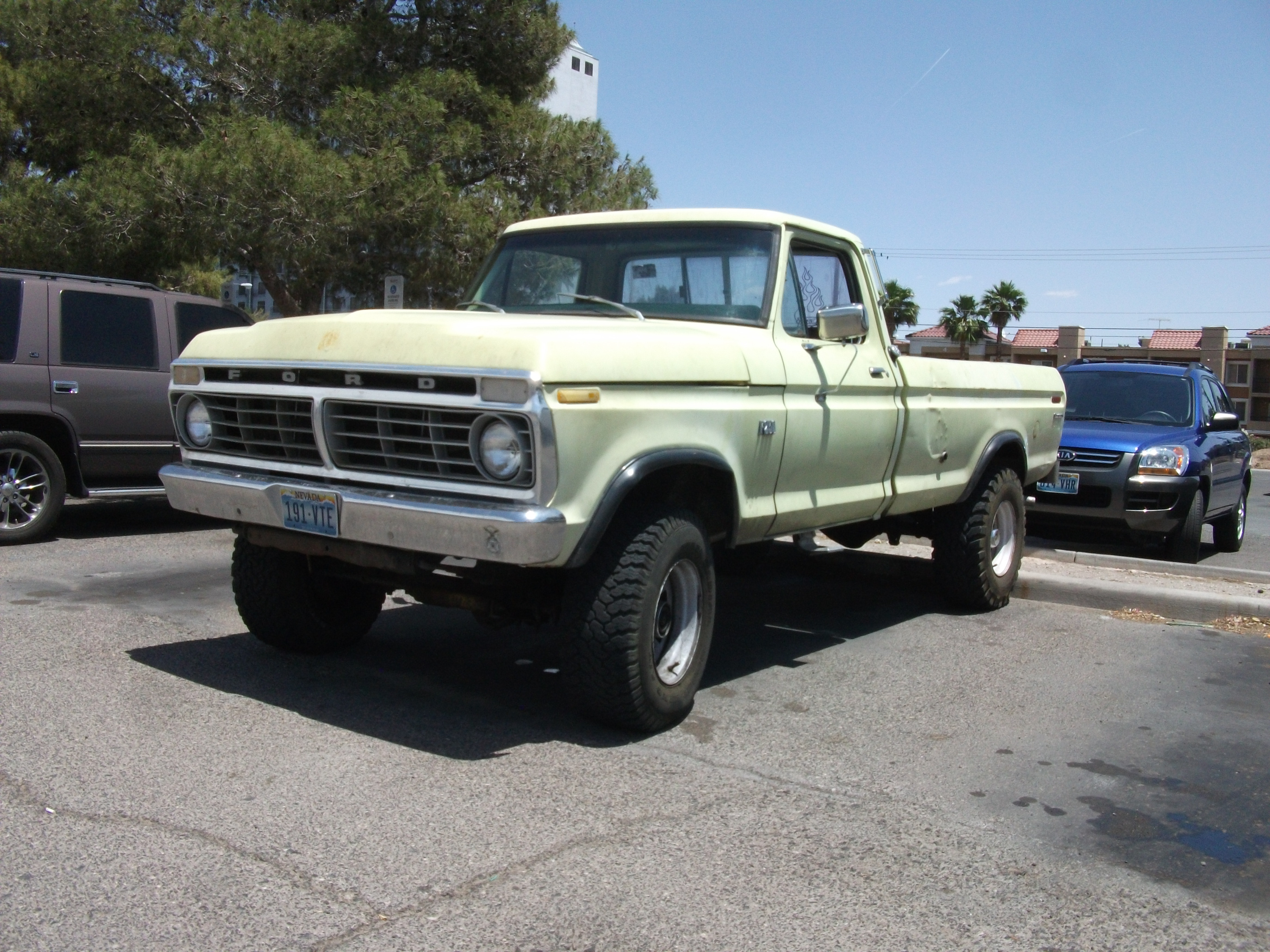
1973-1975 Ford F-250 Custom 4x4

"Highboy" is an enthusiast nickname adopted by a version of the sixth-generation F-series, pertaining to 1967-1977 F-250 4x4s. The largest 4x4s sold by Ford (the F-350 was not offered as a 4x4 until 1979), these trucks used the narrower frame rail spacing of the F-350 and a divorced transfer case (Dana 24, NP205, or NP203; the latter offered full-time four-wheel drive). The model was not a distinct option, but the design configuration that Ford offered for its 4-wheel drive F-250s, deriving its name in reference to its higher ride height (nearly 3 inches taller than a F-100/F-150 4x4 and nearly 6 inches taller than a two-wheel drive F-250). While the highboy design was largely phased out of mass production vehicles by the mid-1970s (with Ford being the last manufacturer to do so), the Ford 1970s "highboy" 4x4 is historically significant, as its design formed the basis of the first commercially promoted monster truck, Bigfoot (a 1974 F-250).

The highboy design configuration saw its origins as American manufacturers introduced factory-produced 4x4 pickup trucks in the late 1950s. To minimize drivetrain complexity, the transfer case was not mounted directly to the transmission, but mounted separately ("divorced") and connected by a short driveshaft. The design required a longer front driveshaft, consequently raising the ride height for both axles. The "highboy" 4x4 were fitted with 3-inch width 5-leaf (or 6-leaf) front springs; the rear suspension was 2 1/4-inch width 9-leaf springs (in contrast to the 3-inch width springs on other F-series trucks); to raise the rear ride height, the rear axle used a 4-inch lift. To aid in suspension travel, the front springs are designed with a larger arch than other F-Series front leaf springs.

For the sixth generation, the F-250 4x4 initially offered with three engines, including the 240 inline-6 (1973-1974) and 300 cubic-inch inline-6 (1973-1977), and a 360 cubic-inch V8 (1973-1976); for 1977, the 360 was replaced by the 351M and 400 V8s. The configuration was not offered with the 390 V8 (or the 460 that replaced it). Two transmissions were offered, including a 4-speed manual and 3-speed automatic (the latter, only offered with V8 engines). Power-assisted brakes were introduced as an option for the sixth generation; front disc brakes were added in 1976 (replacing four-wheel drum brakes).

The F-250 4x4 was marketed in both single-cab and crew cab configurations (the latter, one of the rarest versions of the sixth-generation F-series). Offered in the Custom, Ranger, and Ranger XLT trims only with a long bed, the configuration was not offered with the SuperCab body, auxiliary fuel tanks, and the Camper Special option package. The location of the transfer case precluded the fitment of a second fuel tank and the higher ride height would have decreased rear-seat access for the two-door SuperCab. The Camper Special was not marketed on "highboy" trucks, as that option package was developed specifically for slide-in campers; raising the center of gravity further on a Highboy truck could have posed a greater rollover hazard.

During the mid-1970s, Ford began to revise the design of its F-250 4x4s. As a running change during the 1977 model year, Ford introduced a "married" transfer case (attached to the transmission); a design used by the Jeep Gladiator and GM Action-Line pickups, Ford was the last major pickup manufacturer to phase in the design. While slightly more complex (in drivetrain layout), the "married" configuration allowed for a ride height nearly matching two-wheel drive trucks and simpler suspension design; the "lowboy" 4x4 configuration is used for currently produced pickup trucks today. The "divorced" transfer case remained in production, ending production during the 1977 model year.

=== F-100 Eluminator (2021) ===
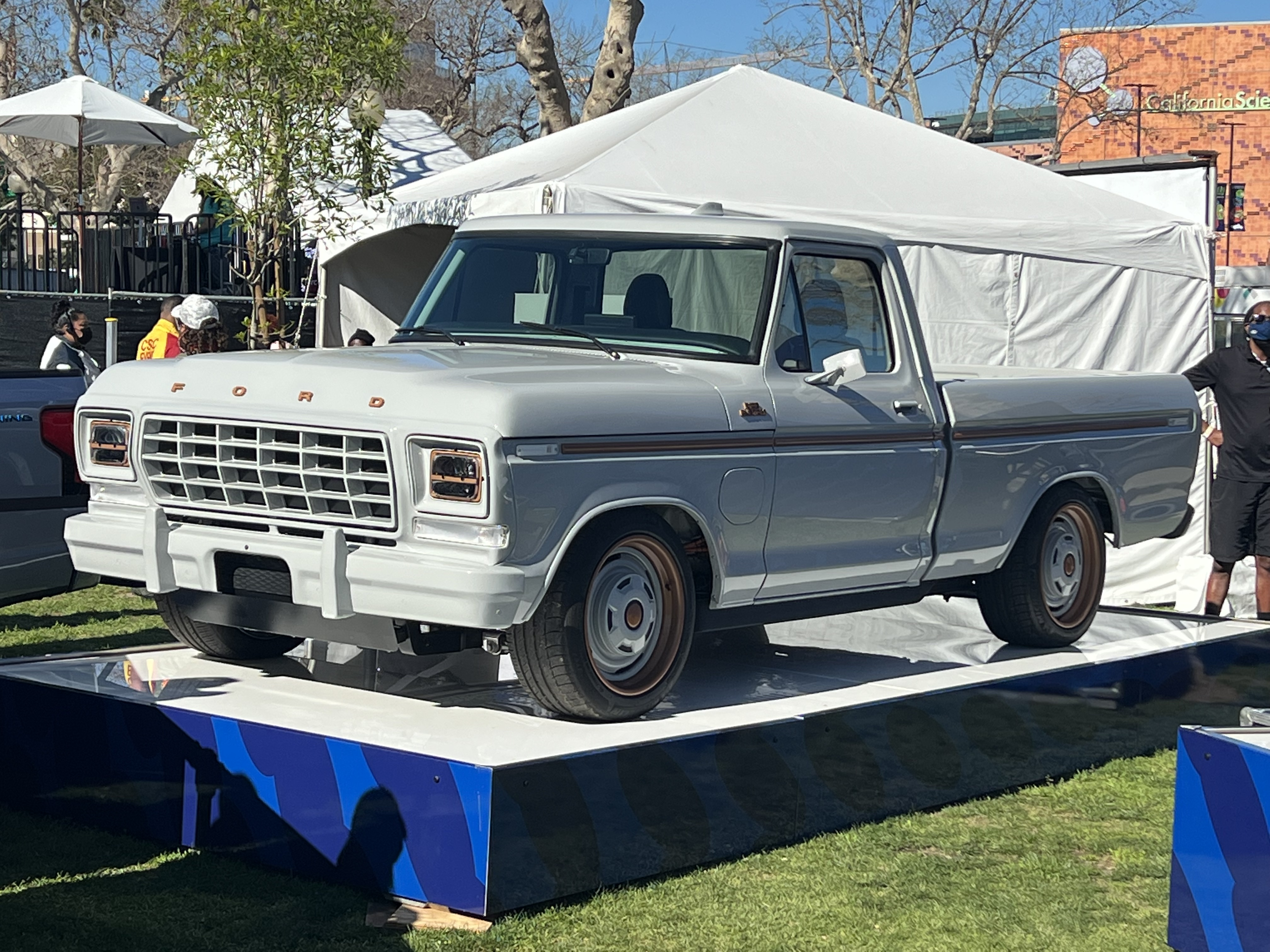
F-100 Eluminator on display at the Los Angeles Coliseum (Feb 2022)

At the 2021 SEMA show in Las Vegas, Ford unveiled the F-100 Eluminator one-off concept truck, an electromod restoration of a 1978 F-100 repowered with the electric vehicle drivetrain and front and rear suspension subframes taken from the Mustang Mach-E GT Performance Edition. The vehicle was designed by Ford Performance and built by several aftermarket shops under contract to Ford to advertise the availability of the Eluminator crate motor replacement for classic vehicles. "Eluminator" is an allusion to the Ford 5.2L "Aluminator" Modular V8 engine.

Ford contributed front and rear sub-frames, which were already fitted with electric traction motors, and a battery pack from the Mach-E production line. Roadster Shop built a custom ladder frame to support the vintage body, attach the subframes, and carry the battery underneath the cab and bed. McCue-Lane Electric Race Cars (MLe) handled final integration of the driveline components. Major interior components also were taken from the Mach-E and used in the "electromod" truck. Brand X Customs handled the restoration of the body, finishing it in Avalanche Gray with copper-colored trim. The 19 in (480 mm) wheels were built by Forgeline.

The Eluminator crate motor has an output of 281 hp (210 kW) and 317 lb⋅ft (430 N⋅m) of torque, with a total weight of 205 lb (93 kg). At the time of release, Ford Performance announced they also were planning to develop battery systems, controllers, and traction inverters to make a complete drop-in EV drivetrain replacement available commercially for interested parties. The F-100 Eluminator is fitted with two traction motors, one each for the front and rear axles, with a combined output of 480 hp (360 kW) and 634 lb⋅ft (860 N⋅m) of torque. As tested by Motor Trend, the truck is 5,140 lb (2,330 kg), 160 lb (73 kg) heavier than the Mach-E donor and it retains its 1978-era aerodynamic drag, so performance is accordingly lower, with the F-100 Eluminator recording a 0–60 mph (0–97 km/h) time of 3.9 seconds (compared to 3.6 s for the Mach-E) and a 1/4 mi (0.40 km) time of 13.0 seconds at a trap speed of 95.7 mph (154.0 km/h) (12.6 s at 100.6 mph (161.9 km/h) for the Mach-E). The same 88 kW-hr battery from the Mach-E has a reduced estimated range of 200 mi (320 km) in the F-100 Eluminator, 60 mi (97 km) less than the Mach-E due in part to the increased aerodynamic drag of the F-100. Ford Performance engineer Brian Novak said that since the engineering drawings were finished, a second example could be built for "McLaren money, not Bugatti money", which Motor Trend estimated to be US$500,000.
