= Motor Madness =

American television series

Motor Madness is a motorsports based television show on The Nashville Network debuted in 1997. It was originally formatted as a live, three-hour show with a studio segment and coverage of a live event. Racing events included USA Motorsports and later USHRA Monster Jam monster trucks, demolition derbies, tractor pulls, swamp buggies, and either live pacers awards or upcoming previews of CBS motorsports properties—the World of Outlaws Sprint Series, American Speed Association ACDelco Challenge Series, the NASCAR Winston Cup Series, NASCAR Busch Grand National Series, and the NASCAR Craftsman Truck Series.

In the second season (1998), the studio segments were replaced with live antics involving the announcers, due to the pregnancy of one of the show's studio segment hosts, Katie Haas. Many fans were angered at the change, and the show's live format was canceled. The name lived on for a few more seasons in a change to the Monster Jam monster truck exclusive format, then was completely abandoned for the Monster Jam moniker.
