= Bigfoot (video game) =

1990 video game

- North American cover art
- Developer: Beam Software
- Publisher: Acclaim
- Designers: Adam Lancman; Andrew Davie; Russell Conte
- Programmer: Andrew Davie
- Composer: Tania Smith
- Platform: Nintendo Entertainment System
- Release: NA: July 1990; EU: January 24, 1991
- Genre: Racing
- Mode: Single-player

Bigfoot is a racing video game released in July 1990 for the Nintendo Entertainment System. It was developed by Beam Software and published by Acclaim. The game was advertised by the legendary monster truck of the same name in the cartoon segment of the 1990 television show, Video Power, titled The Power Team. The show also often used sound effects for the actions of not only Bigfoot, but others as well.

== Gameplay ==
The gameplay involves racing monster trucks including the title truck, Bigfoot (blue). The computer controlled trucks are green (The Growler), and yellow (The Charger). The player begins competing against The Growler, but if the computer's truck runs out of money it will forfeit the race and be replaced with The Charger. Should The Charger run out of money it will be replaced with a second green vehicle and so on. It was not uncommon for a skilled player to be challenged by three to four different monster trucks during the game. In two player mode the 2nd player's truck is red. The object of the game is to advance to the next level (race) with incurring the least amount of damage as possible. The levels consist of car crushing, mud bog, tractor pull, hill climb, and the later levels are a combination of everything except the sled pull, simply called a drag race. To advance to the next event the player must complete a "cross country" race collecting money, points, etc. without damaging the truck.
