= TNT Motorsports =

1980s promoter of monster truck events

TNT Motorsports was a popular promoter of monster truck races, tractor pulls, and occasionally mud racing in the 1980s. TNT was an acronym for “Trucks n Tractors” founded by the late Billy Joe Miles of Owensboro, Kentucky. Events were shown on Powertrax on ESPN, Trucks and Tractor Power on TNN, and the syndicated Tuff Trax. In 1988, TNT produced 77 shows that it estimated drew 1 million fans. In 1989, the company had $12 million in revenue.

== Series ==
TNT's truck and tractor pulling championship was sponsored by Red Man smokeless tobacco. Champions were crowned in the four-wheel drive truck, two-wheel drive truck, up to two multi-engine modified tractor, unlimited multi-engine modified tractor, super stock tractor, and pro stock tractor divisions. Notable pullers were "The Professor" Dr. Wayne Rausch with his "Yellow Model T" and "Little Red Truck" two-wheel drives trucks, "Full Pull" Pat Freels' "Cheers" t-bucket two wheel drive and "Dollar Devil" modified tractor, the Banter Brothers' several unlimited tractors, Tim Engler's "Mission Impossible" unlimited tractor, and the "Stitches" team of trucks owned by Jim Lyons.

Renegades tobacco sponsored the Monster Truck Challenge series, which became a championship (the first monster truck racing championship ever) in 1988. Bigfoot, USA-1, Awesome Kong, Equalizer, Carolina Crusher, Night Life, and King Krunch were among the most competitive trucks, while Dennis Anderson and Grave Digger became the most popular truck on the circuit, sending them to eventual superstardom.

Only a handful of events would feature Pro Modified Mud Bog Racing. By 1988, mud bog racing was dropped from TNT Motorsports events.

== Shows ==
=== Tuff Trax ===
Tuff Trax was a syndicated show produced by TNT and distributed by Qintex. ESPN and TNN broadcast the show. The 1992 episode "Gravedigger—The Video" showcased a restored 1950s television van named Gravedigger. The 1992 episode "Inside TNT Motorsports" profiled a demolition derby. It demonstrated how the event space is landscaped, and how the vehicles are readied for demolishing.

== Buyout ==
In late 1990, TNT was bought out by SRO/Pace, the promoter who at the time owned the competitor United States Hot Rod Association sanctioning body, and all former TNT events became USHRA events. Most vehicles continued to compete in the USHRA, but some monster truck owners, notably Everett Jasmer of USA-1, did not, as they wished to only compete in open-qualifying races (such as TNT) rather than invitation-only events.
