= Snake Bite (truck) =

Monster truck

Owner and driver information
- Owner: Bob Chandler
- Driver(s): Dan Runte, Gene Patterson, Sky Hartley, Rick Long, Ron Bachman, Dave Harkey, Nigel Morris, Alan Hartsock, Eric Meagher, Lonny Childress, Keith Sturgeon, Shane Blair
- Home city: Pacific, Missouri

Truck information
- Year created: 1991
- Body style: Custom 3-D design
- Transmission: Ford C6 transmission, Abruzzi 2-Speed
- Tires: 66 inch Firestone

Snake Bite is an alternate name and identity used for Bigfoot monster trucks when two are scheduled at one event. The identity was initially created in 1991 to promote a Mattel Hot Wheels toy. Snake Bite was the first 3D character body monster truck.

== History ==
Following a heavily damaging crash in 1991 in Nashville, Tennessee, that destroyed the entire suspension and drivetrain of Bigfoot #4, the truck was rebuilt using a "hybrid" suspension that utilized nitrogen shock technology first used in Bigfoot #8. Prior to the start of the 1991 PENDA Points Series season, Bigfoot #4 was re-branded as Snake Bite and promoted as a rival to Bigfoot. The Ford F-Series fiberglass truck body was replaced with a hand-sculpted 3D fiberglass body that made the hood, fender, grille, and portions of the doors resemble a red, yellow, and green venomous snake with fangs. Snake Bite debuted in April 1991 on the PENDA Points Series at the 6th Annual 4-Wheel and Off-Road Jamboree Spring Nationals held at the Memphis Motorsports Park in Memphis, Tennessee. Gene Patterson drove Snake Bite under the persona of "Colt Cobra" hailing from the fictional town of "Cobra Creek, Colorado" and wore a red and yellow racing mask that resembled the design of the snake truck body. Other drivers of Snake Bite have used the "Colt Cobra", "Ricky Rattler", or "Vic Venom" personas as part of the Snake Bite gimmick.

During the 1991 PENDA Points Series 4-Wheel and Off-Road Jamboree Northern Nationals held at the Racine County Fairgrounds in Union Grove, Wisconsin, Snake Bite lost control, ran off the course, and demolished a shed. No one was injured in the incident.

In 1992, Bigfoot #8 ran the Snake Bite body and finished second in the PENDA Points Series standings behind Bigfoot #10. In 1993, Bigfoot #10 was outfitted as Snake Bite. Snake Bite came in second place in the PENDA Points Series standings behind Bigfoot #11 in 1993 and 1994. Snake Bite was redesigned in 1996, changing from a primary red color to green. Bigfoot #15, racing as Snake Bite, won the 1997 PENDA Points Series Championship with driver Eric Meagher.

Snake Bite returned to a primary red color scheme in 2004. In 2009, the Snake Bite paint scheme was changed to red, black, and silver.

In 2016 the name was revived for the 25th anniversary of its debut. The design is a "Retro Red" paint scheme that resembles the original 1991 design.
