= Gary Porter (driver) =

American racing driver

Personal information
- Nationality: American
- Born: July 31, 1961 (age 65)

Sport
- Country: United States
- Sport: Monster Jam
- Team: Carolina Crusher
- Retired: 2017

Gary Francis Porter (born 1961) is an American former monster-truck driver who races on the United States Hot Rod Association circuit. He is a former member of the Grave Digger team but returned to his Carolina Crusher truck in 2015. In July 2017, Porter retired from monster truck driving after spending 32 years in the sport. In 2013, he was inducted in the international monster truck hall of fame. He was inducted again in 2021 in the Monster Jam Hall Of Fame.

== History ==
Porter's involvement in monster truck began in 1981 when he opened Porter's 4x4 Shop in Wadesboro, North Carolina, with his brother. In 1985, they built their first truck to promote the business and compete in local shows. Soon afterward, they modified the truck, and Porter began his monster-truck racing career. In 1987, he started competing in a monster truck called the Carolina Crusher with TNT Motosports. The Porters participated in exhibitions from 1985 to 1988. He placed fourth in 1988, second in 1989, and third in 1990.

Beginning in 1991, Porter raced in the USHRA/Camel Mud & Monster Series. The Carolina Crusher placed sixth and became the series champion of the Special Events season. In 1992, the Porters decided to build a second truck to be able to compete in three different monster truck series. A third Carolina Crusher appeared for the 1994 season, as did a new shop to host Carolina Crusher Racing. The trucks made 125 appearances in 1994. 1995 saw Carolina Crusher finish fourth in the Special Events Penda Points series and winning a race. Gary continued to race Carolina Crusher until after its sale to Paul Shafer in 1999.

In 2000, Clear Channel Entertainment hired Porter to drive various trucks for them, notably Ragin' Steel and Spider-Man. The following year, at the behest of longtime friend and rival Dennis Anderson, he began driving Grave Digger 12, whose chassis was similar to that of his last incarnation of Carolina Crusher.

== World Finals appearances ==
Porter was in Monster Jam World Finals 2 driving Spider-Man. He was eliminated in the first round by Avenger, but returned when Avenger broke down. He was eliminated in the second round by Destroyer. He later finished seventh in freestyle with a score of 31.

In World Finals 9, Porter was involved in an encore driving the new Spitfire truck.

== Hallmarks ==
Off the track, Porter is regarded as one of the sport's true gentlemen. The 1992 USHRA Yearbook referred to him as "Mr. Nice Guy".

Porter was inducted as the 12th star in the international monster truck hall of fame in 2013

On February 28, 2021, it was announced that Porter and Mike Wales would be inducted into the 2021 Class of the Monster Jam Hall of Fame. Porter and Wales were inducted during a show at NRG Stadium on October 23, 2021.

== See also ==
- List of people from North Carolina
