= Carolina Crusher =

Specialized competition off-road vehicle

Owner and driver information
- Owner: Feld Entertainment
- Driver(s): Gary Porter
- Home city: Wadesboro, North Carolina

Truck information
- Year created: 1985
- Body style: Custom desert truck body
- Tires: 66 inch BKT

Carolina Crusher is a monster truck in the Feld Entertainment Monster Jam series. The first version of Carolina Crusher was built in 1985 by Gary Porter. Gary Porter and Carolina Crusher was one of the most popular monster trucks of the 1980s and 1990s. In the Fall of 2014, it was announced that Gary Porter would be returning to the Carolina Crusher in the Monster Jam series to celebrate the 30th anniversary of the truck in 2015.

== History ==
Gary Porter's brother owned a four-wheel drive shop in Wadesboro, North Carolina and Porter was always interested in four-wheel drives. Porter saw his first monster truck show in 1982 in Indianapolis, Indiana. In 1985, Porter built the first Carolina Crusher monster truck for $11,000. Carolina Crusher was initially used to help advertise for his brother's four-wheel drive shop with the hope to compete in monster truck shows. Porter and Carolina Crusher's first professional appearance occurred at the Spare Time 4x4 Center in Greensboro, North Carolina.

In 1988, Carolina Crusher debuted on the TNT Monster Truck Challenge, the first official monster truck points series. Carolina Crusher finished fourth in the 1988 standings. In 1989, Carolina Crusher finished second in the standings, behind Equalizer.

The PENDA Points Series was established in 1991 and became the premiere monster truck racing circuit. In the inaugural season of the PENDA Points Series, Carolina Crusher won the points championship. Carolina Crusher competed in the PENDA Points Series until its dissolution after the 1997 season.

In 1993, Carolina Crusher was a regular on the television series “Monster Wars”. Gary Porter finished third in the points standings and won two televised races. Its representing mascot character was an overweight construction worker with a jackhammer.

In 1999, Gary Porter sold Carolina Crusher to Paul Shafer, creator of the Monster Patrol monster truck. Porter moved on to sign with Pace Motorsports (now Feld Entertainment Motorsports) to drive Grave Digger on the Monster Jam series.

Carolina Crusher, driven by Michael Harper, won the 2004 and 2005 Checkered Flag Productions – Monster Truck Winter Nationals. In 2005, Carolina Crusher, driven by James Tigue II, won the Paul Shafer Motorsports World Finals in Freestyle.

In the 2010s, Carolina Crusher was converted to a ride truck.

Carolina Crusher has been featured in several video games, including, Monster Truck Wars on Game Boy, Monster Truck Madness, Monster Truck Madness 2, Monster Truck Madness 64, and Monster Truck Destruction. Many Carolina Crusher toys have been produced since the late 1980s, including Micro Machines, Muscle Machines, and Hot Wheels.

== Present ==
Feld Entertainment leased the rights for Carolina Crusher from Paul Shafer in 2014. After the end of a promotional agreement between Monster Jam and Marvel Comics, the Captain America monster truck was rebranded as Carolina Crusher. Gary Porter, a driver for Monster Jam since 2001, would be returning to Carolina Crusher's driver seat in 2015.

At the 2016 Monster Jam World Finals XVII, Carolina Crusher and Porter won the 2016 Arena Wheelie of the Year award.

Gary Porter was the 12th inductee in the International Monster Truck Hall of Fame In 2013.

Gary Porter and Mike Wales were inducted into the Monster Jam Hall of Fame during a show at NRG Stadium on October 23, 2021.
