= USA-1 (monster truck) =

Competition monster truck

Owner and driver information
- Owner: Past: Everett Jasmer; Current: Triple B Motorsports
- Driver(s): Past: Steve Wilke; Rod Litzau; Roger Gauger; Current: Rodney Tweedy
- Home city: St.Cloud, MN

Truck information
- Year created: 1982
- Body style: 2015 Chevrolet Trophy Truck
- Chassis: PEI XT3
- Engine: 540ci Chevrolet
- Transmission: FTI
- Tires: 2nd Generation BKT

USA-1 is a monster truck that competed during the 1980s and 1990s, named after a Chevrolet ad campaign. It competed against Bigfoot in the first televised monster truck race on the American television show That's Incredible! in 1983. The truck was initially painted blue before it was repainted in white.

== History ==
Everett Jasmer built and raced the truck in the late 1970s. USA-1 was a consistent winner in the mid-to-late 1980s with Steve Wilke and Rod Litzau sharing the driving, and is best known for its many wins and legendary crashes. It won the 1988 TNT Monster Truck Racing Series championship. It was one of the last nationally competitive monster trucks to use a leaf spring suspension. Everett contacted Mark Hall, co-owner of Raminator, to campaign a USA-1 body in 1992 on their Executioner chassis. In the next year, Everett had Kirk Dabney campaign the body on his Nitemare 4 chassis. USA-1 stopped racing in the early 1990s, after the folding of the TNT Monster Truck Racing Series. As of March 2008, Everett owns the original vehicles and the trademark to the name. He has been trying to find a racing series that meets his vision of professional monster truck racing. In November 2011, Everett Jasmer was inducted into the International Monster Truck Hall of Fame. In 2021, Jasmer sold his entire operation to James Trantina of Triple B Motorsports. James runs the name on a team-owned truck, which marks the first time since the early 1990s that the name would be run on a truck owned by the team, rather than leased. In 2022, James would take the original USA-1 truck out and made a pass at a tractor pull.

== See also ==
- List of monster trucks
