= Bigfoot (truck) =

Monster truck

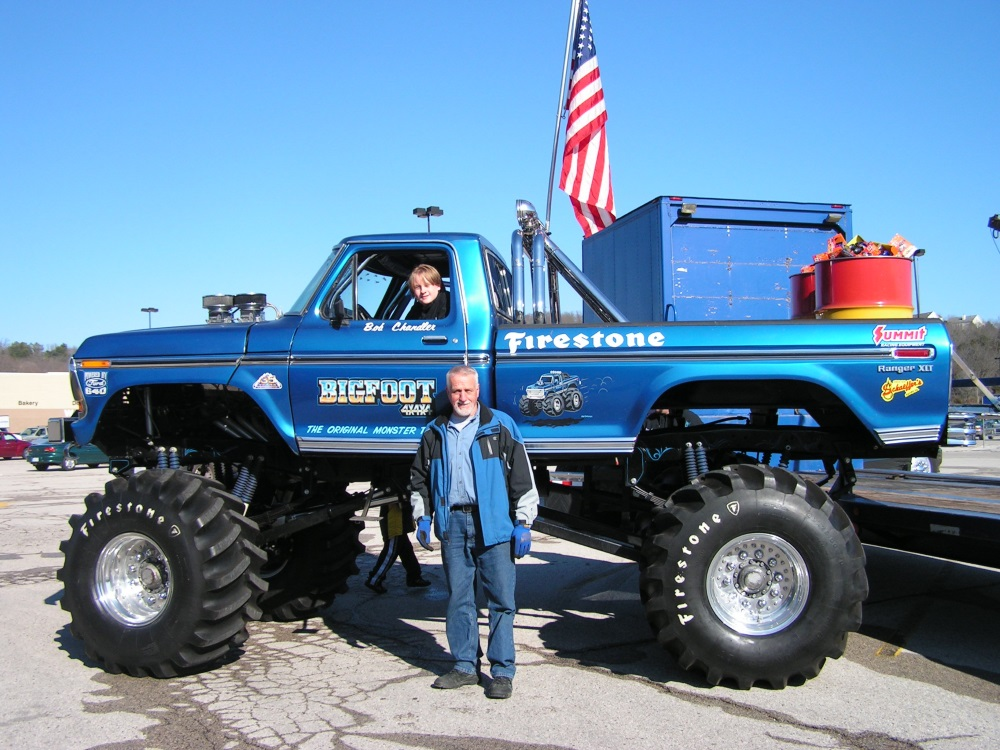
- The original Bigfoot in 2009

Owner and driver information
- Owner: Bob Chandler
- Home city: Pacific, Missouri

Truck information
- Year created: 1975
- Body style: 1979 Ford F-250
- Engine: Varies
- Transmission: Ford C6 transmission, Abruzzi 2-Speed
- Tires: 48-inch (120 cm), 66-inch (170 cm), and 120-inch (300 cm) Firestone

Bigfoot is the name of a series of monster trucks, originally built and owned by American off-road racing enthusiast and auto shop owner Bob Chandler.

Chandler first began modifying his Ford F-250 pickup truck in 1975. By 1979, Bigfoot's lower assembly and axles were completely replaced, and the truck featured its iconic four-wheel steering and 48-inch tires. It has since come to be seen as the world's first proper monster truck.

The original Bigfoot would make many public appearances beginning in 1979, including the world's first car-crushing in 1981. Enthusiasm about the truck would lead Chandler to construct several more heavily modified trucks under the "Bigfoot" name, eventually growing into Bigfoot 4X4 Inc.

Other trucks under the name of "Bigfoot" have been introduced in the years since, and it remains a well-known monster truck moniker in the United States.

== Early history ==
A former construction worker and off-roading enthusiast from the St. Louis area, Chandler began racing in 1975, using the Chandler family's 1974 Ford F-250 four-wheel drive pickup truck and found that automotive shops in the Midwest generally did not carry the parts needed to repair the frequent damage. To remedy this problem, Chandler and his wife Marilyn, along with friend Jim Kramer, opened a shop called Midwest Four Wheel Drive and Performance Center in Ferguson, Missouri. The shop moved to Hazelwood, Missouri, in 1984, which remained as Bigfoot's headquarters until 2015 when the headquarters was relocated to Pacific, Missouri.

In 1979, Chandler replaced the under assembly of the truck with one from a military-surplus top loader featuring four-wheel drive and four-wheel steering that used 48-inch (120 cm) tires. This modification drew attention and Chandler started making appearances at tractor pulls and car shows with his newly christened "Bigfoot" (so named for Chandler's heavy-footed racing style which caused frequent breakage of parts) to show off the truck's capabilities as well as to promote his shop. The truck's growing popularity led to its appearance in the 1981 Gus Trikonis film Take This Job and Shove It (which also features the early monster truck USA-1 credited under a different name).

Chandler's next experiment would prove revolutionary. In 1981, Chandler placed two dilapidated cars in a field, so that he could videotape himself crushing the cars with Bigfoot as a joke. When Chandler began playing the video in his shop, a man promoting a motorsports event in Columbia, Missouri, asked him to duplicate the stunt in front of a crowd. After initial hesitation because of the destructive image it would convey, Chandler eventually agreed to perform at the event in April of the following year in what is believed to be the first public car crush. Later that year, a second Bigfoot, built to help meet the steadily rising demand to see the vehicle and sporting 66-inch-tall (170 cm) tires, received more major media attention by crushing cars at the Pontiac Silverdome in Pontiac, Michigan. In 1983, Bigfoot began receiving sponsorship from Ford Motor Company, a relationship which continued until 2005.

By 1984, many truck owners around the country had taken to imitating Chandler's template of outfitting their vehicles with tires standing 66-inch (170 cm) tall, with some trucks sporting even larger tires. Promoters of truck and tractor pulls, such as SRO Motorsports (later the United States Hot Rod Association) and Golden State Promotions, noticed the exploding popularity of the giant trucks and began booking several to crush cars at their events, with the eventual result being the advent of side-by-side, drag-racing style car crushing events. A popular example of the early days of monster truck racing is portrayed in the 1986 home video release Return of the Monster Trucks, which involves a truck pull, car crushing, and mud bogging all in the same course. That event, held in the Louisiana Superdome, was won by Bigfoot, as well as most of the events it was entered into in the mid-1980s. By this point, Chandler had already built an entire fleet of "Bigfoot" trucks to accommodate the vast demand for his vehicle, which remained as the most popular and marketable monster truck despite the large number of imitators. In 1987, Chandler added to his innovations by founding the Monster Truck Racing Association, which remains today as the chief voice in monster truck safety.

Another form of competition Chandler faced was the physical size of the competition. Many truck owners had taken to calling their vehicles the "world's largest monster truck", so Chandler outfitted his "Bigfoot 4" vehicle with 10-foot-tall (305 cm) tires he had purchased from a junkyard owner in Seattle for $1,000. The tires had been previously used by the US Army in Alaska on their overland train in the 1950s. In 1986, Chandler built a new truck, "Bigfoot 5", specifically for the tires. Upon its public debut in Indianapolis, Indiana, the truck immediately took the title of the "world's tallest, widest, and heaviest monster truck" and was eventually given official recognition of the title by the Guinness Book of Records in 2002. With a second set of 10-foot-tall (305 cm) tires attached, the truck stands 15 feet 6 inches (4.72 m) tall, measures 20 feet 5 inches (6.22 m) wide, and weighs over 38,000 pounds (17,000 kg).

== Racing history ==
The fledgling all-sports television network ESPN also took note of the popularity of monster trucks in the 1980s and began showing events promoted by the United States Hot Rod Association and TNT Motorsports on a regular basis. With the frequent broadcasts of monster truck races, the next logical step was to create a championship series of monster truck races. TNT began the first recognized series in 1988, and was dominated by Bigfoot for much of the season. However, upstart rookie Rod Litzau, driving the USA-1 truck, gained momentum and passed Bigfoot in the standings going into the last weekend of the season in Louisville, Kentucky. With the way the points system and elimination brackets had been structured, Bigfoot (driven by Rich Hooser) and USA-1 met in the semifinal round with USA-1 clinching the points championship if it beat Bigfoot. USA-1 won the race in spectacular fashion, rolling over in the process, and took the championship. After losing the championship, the Bigfoot team made the decision to shift their focus less on competition and more on research and development in 1989, as well as running frequent events for the USHRA and USA Motorsports and a limited TNT Schedule.

During this time, Chandler began working with computer-aided design (CAD) programs, and using technology he had learned from professional off-road racing, designed a tubular frame for his next Bigfoot truck, along with a nitrogen suspension system sporting 24 inches (61 cm) of travel. This innovation allowed Bigfoot to possess four times as much suspension travel as those used by nearly all previous monster trucks. Chandler would be awarded a patent for his designs. After testing the vehicle for three months, driver Andy Brass debuted the eighth incarnation of Bigfoot, with the new frame and suspension, in late 1989. It officially made its debut at the Indiana State Fairgrounds in Indianapolis, Indiana at the Four Wheel and Off Road Jamboree in a special 5,000th show for Bigfoot (where every Bigfoot vehicle gathered in one place for the first time). It made its debut in competition at a USHRA race in the Astrodome in Houston, Texas, reaching the final round of competition before rolling over against Jack Willman's Taurus.

The following year, after running the USHRA races in Anaheim, California, and Pontiac, Michigan, the truck debuted on the TNT Motorsports Monster Truck Challenge points circuit in Memphis, Tennessee. The Bigfoot 8 chassis was briefly banned from the circuit on April 5, 1990, due to a rule clarification that only allowed leaf, coil, and coil-over suspensions to be run. Although TNT stated that safety was the primary reason for the clarification, they also admitted that another reason was that Bigfoot 8 was simply too technologically advanced and was upsetting the competitive balance of the series. Former BMX racer John Piant, driving Bigfoot 4 raced in place of Bigfoot 8 in multiple events, and Andy Brass drove Bigfoot 4 to victory at the Louisville Motor Speedway. Bigfoot 8 returned to the TNT circuit after the temporary ban had been lifted. Chandler also took legal action against TNT.

Team Bigfoot ended up winning 24 events that season and took the 1990 TNT points championship over Greg Holbrook in Gary Cook's Equalizer and Gary Porter's Carolina Crusher, the first racing championship for the Bigfoot team. Also that year, Piant took the Special Events Triple Crown Championship, in addition to placing third in the USHRA's new point series. After not winning any championships in 1991, Team Bigfoot would go on a 12-year stretch from 1992 to 2003 of winning at least one championship a year, taking a total of 16 series championship victories during that span.

As of 2019, Team Bigfoot has won a total of 50 series championships.

== Present day ==
Bigfoot continues to be in demand. Sponsorships include Firestone, Summit Racing and Vi-Cor. In December 2005, Bigfoot's sponsorship with Ford ended, though was not announced officially until 2007.

Bigfoot ceased running events for the Monster Jam series in 1998 due to a dispute over involving licensing of video footage and pictures, and has not returned since. Bigfoot also appeared frequently for USA Motorsports and Motorsports Entertainment Group until those companies were purchased by the USHRA's parent company at the time, PACE Motorsports.

Bigfoot still races for the Special Events Promotion Company, Chris Arel Motorsports, Toughest Monster Truck Tour, Monster Nation, Monster X Tour, Checkered Flag Promotions, and many others.

In May 2006, Bigfoot signed former professional wrestler and Monster Jam driver Debrah Miceli. Miceli drove the "Bigfoot 10" chassis until the end of the 2007 Major League of Monster Trucks (MLMT) season. Miceli now drives Madusa for Feld Motorsports.

In July 2010, Bigfoot sponsor Firestone, then a Major League Baseball sponsor, brought Bigfoot to the Major League Baseball All-Star Game as a show truck. In order to comply with MLB's official vehicle sponsorship while being used by Firestone, the Bigfoot 10 chassis featured a Chevrolet Silverado body, as Chevrolet is MLB's official vehicle sponsor. In March 2012, Bigfoot formed a partnership with Robby Gordon to promote both his SPEED Energy Drink and his new Stadium Super Trucks racing series. For the partnership, a chassis initially built for Gordon himself was dubbed Bigfoot 19. Despite a promotional picture depicting the body as being a Ford, this truck would also compete with a highly modified Silverado body.

For his innovation of creating monster trucks, Bob Chandler has been inducted into multiple halls of fame. In 2006, he was inducted in the Missouri Sports Hall of Fame. In November 2011, he was inducted into the International Monster Truck Museum Hall of Fame with its inaugural class. Former driver Jim Kramer was inducted into the second class the following year. Also, in 2013, Chandler was inducted into the Off-road Motorsports Hall of Fame.

On November 30, 2018, Bigfoot was announced as one of the participants in the new Hot Wheels Monster Trucks Live tour being coproduced by Hot Wheels owner Mattel and the Raycom-Legacy Content Company. This reunites a marketing relationship dating back to the 1980s.

== List of vehicles ==
The following is a list of all the vehicles built or owned by Bigfoot 4×4, Inc. Bigfoot #13 was skipped due to superstition regarding the number 13.

Name	Built	Details	Photo
Bigfoot 1	1975	In 1974, Bob Chandler bought a stock 1974 F-250 pickup truck. Over the next few years, Chandler made modifications to the truck to increase its horsepower and off-road capabilities, while promoting his Midwest 4 Wheel Drive Center business. The truck was used in local truck and tractor pulls, mud runs, and other off-road events. In 1979, the 1974 front clip was replaced with a 1979 front clip that flipped forward to allow greater access to the engine and rear steering was introduced. That same year, Bigfoot made its first paid public appearance in Denver, Colorado. In 1981, Bigfoot made the first monster truck car crush. That same year, Bigfoot was featured in the film Take This Job and Shove It. In 1982, Bigfoot was the first monster truck to crush cars in front of an audience. In March 1983, Bigfoot 1 performed in front of 72,000 fans in the largest single day monster truck event at the Pontiac Silverdome. It was in competition until 1987. Currently used as a display vehicle, it resides at the Bigfoot 4 × 4 shop in Pacific, Missouri.	Bigfoot #1, with Jim Kramer, May 12, 2009
Bigfoot 2	1982	Completed in the fall of 1982 to meet demand for appearance of the original truck, Bigfoot 2 was the first monster truck to use 66-inch-tall (170 cm) tires, the standard monster truck tire used from that point forward. The truck raced a paddle steamer on the Chattahoochee River in Columbus, Georgia in 1985. It was modified in 1992 for the purpose of giving fans monster truck rides in the bed of the vehicle. The truck was sold to a private collector in 2000.	Bigfoot 1 and Bigfoot 2 in St. Louis
Bigfoot 3	1983	Built in 66 days in the fall of 1983, it made its debut in January 1984 at the Pontiac Silverdome. It received the same ride-truck modifications as Bigfoot 2 in 1992. It appeared in the movie Police Academy 2: Their First Assignment. It was donated to E.M.T. Financial Fund in 2000. The current owner of the truck is in the process of restoring it.	Bigfoot 3 in St. Louis, January 1984
Bigfoot 4	1984	This truck debuted on July 31, 1984, at the grand opening of the new Bigfoot headquarters in Hazelwood, Missouri. It was the first of the "Stage II" trucks, built specifically as a monster truck and not modified from a stock production vehicle. Bigfoot 4 made its on-track debut on September 14, 1984, at the Riverside Centroplex in Baton Rouge, Louisiana. This truck won the first ever side-by-side monster truck race over an obstacle course in January 1986 at the Louisiana Superdome. This truck was the first of the Bigfoot monster trucks to roll over, which occurred in Murray, Kentucky in 1986. In April 1991, Bigfoot 4 became the first monster truck to have a 3-D concept body, and was redesigned as Snake Bite. The final competition for the truck was February 1998 at the Worcester's Centrum Centre in Worcester, Massachusetts. From 1998 to 2006, Bigfoot 4 was used as a full-time display truck. The truck was sold in 2007.	Bigfoot 4 in St. Louis
Bigfoot 5	1986	Completed in the summer of 1986 and designed exclusively for use with 10 foot tall Firestone Tundra tires from the Overland Train. Bigfoot 5 debuted at the 1986 Fall Jamboree in Indianapolis, and set the record for the tallest, widest, and heaviest pickup truck in the world. Mostly used as a display vehicle, the truck resides at the company headquarters in Pacific, Missouri.	Bigfoot 5 outside company headquarters in Missouri
Bigfoot 6	1986	Built in the fall of 1986. At the Indiana State Fairgrounds in 1987, Bigfoot 6 set a record of jumping over 13 cars. The truck was featured in the 1989 film Police Academy 6: City Under Siege. During 1992 and 1993, Bigfoot 6 toured the United Kingdom, Ireland, Iceland, and other European countries. In 1993, Bigfoot 6 and driver Jim Greco completed 160 performances in 164 days in the United Kingdom. It toured Thailand in 1994. The truck was later sold to a British promoter.	
Bigfoot 7	1988	Built in May 1988 specifically for the movie Road House. In the movie, Bigfoot 7 destroyed a new car showroom and crushed four new cars. That scene cost $500,000 and was shot in one take. It also was used in the movie Tango & Cash. Modified in 1995 to accommodate 10-foot-tall (3 m) tires like Bigfoot 5, the motor, transmission, and steering were removed and the truck was sold to the Race Rock theme restaurant in Orlando. After the restaurant went out of business, it was sold to Fun Spot America in Kissimmee, Florida, where it currently is displayed.	Bigfoot 7 at Fun Spot America
Bigfoot 8	1989	Built in mid-1989, Bigfoot 8 was the first "Stage III" truck, which uses a tubular steel frame and cantilever suspension system chassis with a fiberglass body shell. It was designed by Bob Chandler and Dan Patrick using AutoCAD. In its first year in competition, driver Andy Brass and Bigfoot 8 won the 1990 TNT Monster Truck Challenge. It is currently a display truck.	Bigfoot 8 on display in 2025
Bigfoot 9	1990	Bigfoot 9 debuted on February 10, 1990, in Dayton, Ohio. The truck was seized by Brazilian customs after a tour in 1998 and has never been returned.	
Bigfoot 10	1992	Bigfoot 10 debuted at the St. Louis Arena on January 31, 1992. This was Team Bigfoot's first mid-engine monster truck. This truck won the 1992 Special Events Penda Points Series Championship and the 1999 Checkered Flag Points Championship. Retired after a crash in Amarillo, Texas, in February 2015. The retired truck was converted to a static display for the city of Pacific, Missouri, the current home of the Bigfoot shop.	Bigfoot 10 near St. Louis
Bigfoot 11	1992	Bigfoot 11 debuted at the SEMA Show in Las Vegas in 1992. In 1993, using the name "Wildfoot", the truck won 1993 Special Events Penda Points Series and was named 1993 MTRA Truck of the Year. The truck set a record in 1995 for world's longest monster truck jump at 117 feet (36 m). In 1999, Bigfoot 11 set a world record for monster truck wheelie length at 217 feet 3 inches (66.22 m). Bigfoot 11 was retired after a crash in Springfield, Illinois, in June 2015.	
Bigfoot 12	1993	Built specifically as a display truck, Bigfoot 12 sports a retro-styled body based the original Bigfoot. It debuted on January 28, 1993, in conjunction with Super Bowl XXVII in Los Angeles. Since 2022 it has been on permanent display at the International Monster Truck Museum & Hall of Fame in Butler, Indiana.	Bigfoot 12 on display in 2021
Bigfoot 14	1993	This truck debuted at the Louisiana Superdome in January 1994. This truck won its first points championship in 1995. On September 11, 1999, driver Dan Runte and Bigfoot 14 set a then-world record jump of a monster truck at 202 feet (62 m), breaking the previous record of 144 feet 10 inches (44.15 m). The truck set the record by jumping over a Boeing 727 airplane at the Tennessee Aviation Days air show at the Smyrna, Tennessee, Airport.	Bigfoot 14 in St. Louis, October 16, 2010
Bigfoot 15	1994	Bigfoot 15 debuted at the SEMA Show in Las Vegas, Nevada, in November 1994. In 1997, the truck won its first championship competing as Snake Bite. The truck won championships in 2000, 2007, 2010, 2011, and 2012.	Bigfoot 15 jumping at the Brown County Arena in 2015
Bigfoot 16	2007	Begun in 1998, but not completed until April 2007, Bigfoot 16 debuted at the Four Wheel and Off Road Jamboree in Springfield, Missouri. This was the first truck completed after Ford's sponsorship of Bigfoot ended; as such, it was the first Bigfoot monster truck to have a 2-speed Powerglide transmission rather than a 3-speed Ford C-6 transmission. In its first year of competition, Bigfoot 16, driven by Dan Runte, won the Major League of Monster Trucks championship. Retired after a crash in 2012 at the Indianapolis 4x4 Jamboree when driven by Larry Swim.	Bigfoot 16 in Jefferson City, Missouri, February 8, 2012
Bigfoot 17	2003	Built and operated by Nigel Morris, owner of L.A. Supertrux, Ltd., in a partnership with Bigfoot 4x4, Inc. Bigfoot 17 made its debut at Truckfest Peterborough on the May Bank Holiday in 2003. The truck competed exclusively in Europe. The truck, without the Bigfoot name, was sold to an operator in Spain when Morris retired from driving in 2017.	Bigfoot 17 competing at the Monster Mania event at The Hop Farm Country Park on August 16, 2008
Bigfoot 18	2011	Bigfoot 18 was completed in December 2011 and was the first Bigfoot truck to feature a trophy truck-style body. Dan Runte and the truck won the Toughest Monster Truck Tour Championship in its first year of race competition. In September 2012, Dan Runte and Bigfoot reclaimed the Guinness Book of Records title for world's longest monster truck jump at the 2012 Indianapolis 4x4 Jamboree. The truck jumped 214 feet 8 inches (65.43 m) to break Bad Habit's previous world record long jump.	
Bigfoot 19	2012	Bigfoot 19 was completed in September 2012. It is the first Bigfoot truck to make its debut overseas, doing so in Aruba in October 2012. Bigfoot 19 made its American debut in Cincinnati on December 29, 2012. This was the first Chevrolet big-block engine–powered Bigfoot.	Bigfoot 19 in Akron, Ohio, in 2013
Bigfoot 20	2012	Bigfoot 20 was built as the world's first electric monster truck. The truck is powered by a custom electric motor and 36 Odyssey PC1200 batteries. Bigfoot 20 debuted at the SEMA Show in Las Vegas, Nevada, on October 30, 2012. The truck made its first car crush on November 8, 2012.	Bigfoot 20 on display
Bigfoot 21	2014	Bigfoot 21 was completed on December 24, 2014, and debuted in Southaven, Mississippi, on January 9–10, 2015, winning a race and freestyle competition in its debut weekend. This truck uses "zoomie" headers that gives it "a very loud and unique sound as compared to other Bigfoot trucks."	Bigfoot 21 in January 2026
Bigfoot 22		A ride truck under construction by the team as of 2023.	
Bigfoot 23	2023	Debuted on October 7, 2023, at the Hot Wheels Monster Trucks Live show in Kansas City, Missouri.	
Bigfoot 24	2025	The newest truck in the fleet, it was completed in 2025, making its debut at the Bigfoot shop's annual open house event in celebration of the team's 50th anniversary.	

=== Other vehicles ===
Name	Built	Details	Photo
Ms. Bigfoot/Bigfoot Ranger	1985	This truck was the last Bigfoot truck to be completed from a factory production pickup truck. The truck produced 1,000 horsepower (750 kW) horsepower from a 571-cubic-inch (9.36 L) supercharged aluminum hemi engine. Ms. Bigfoot debuted at Jack Murphy Stadium in San Diego, California, on July 4, 1985. Marilyn Chandler, wife of Bigfoot creator Bob Chandler, became the first female monster truck driver when she drove Ms. Bigfoot. In 1987, the truck was redesigned as "Bigfoot Ranger". Bigfoot Ranger was the first Bigfoot truck to be sold.	
Bigfoot Shuttle	1985	Built from an Aerostar minivan, it has the stock V6 engine. Nitrous oxide injection was added later. In 2002, it was sold for private use.	
Bigfoot Fastrax	1987	Based on an M84 mortar carrier chassis with two Ford 460ci engines and C6 automatic transmissions, it was purchased by Bigfoot in 1988 and underwent extensive modifications. The body is the upper half of a fiberglass replica of a 1990 Aerostar. It was used as a display vehicle.	Bigfoot Fastrax
Bigfoot Race Rock 2	1999	A non-functioning replica built specifically for permanent display at the Race Rock restaurant in Las Vegas to match the display of Bigfoot 7 at their Orlando restaurant. After the restaurant went out of business, it was sold to the Historic Attractions Museum in Roscoe, Illinois, where it currently resides.	

== Snake Bite ==
Snake Bite is an alternate name and appearance sometimes used when a second truck is scheduled to appear at the same event. The first Snake Bite (using Bigfoot 4's chassis) was originally driven by Gene Patterson, under the pseudonym of Colt Cobra. He wore a mask to hide his identity and came from the fictional town of Cobra Creek, Colorado. Other Bigfoot trucks and drivers have used the identities over the years.

== Video games ==
Bigfoot has been the focus of multiple video games. The first Bigfoot video game was released in 1990 by Acclaim Entertainment for the Nintendo Entertainment System. Bigfoot is also the featured truck in the Monster Truck Madness series by Microsoft from the 1990s. Bigfoot: Collision Course was released on multiple platforms in 2008. Monster Truck Destruction, released on iOS and Android platforms in 2012, also features multiple Bigfoot trucks. Bigfoot Crush is a 2020 arcade game released by UNIS.

== Film and television appearances ==
The original Bigfoot appears in the 1981 film Take This Job and Shove It, where it appears as the main character's personal truck. This was the first appearance of a monster truck in film. A virtual Bigfoot is used by the character Aech inside the virtual reality universe OASIS in the 2018 film Ready Player One. Other appearances by Bigfoot trucks in film include Cannonball Run 2, Police Academy 2: Their First Assignment, Road House, Police Academy 6: City Under Siege, Tango & Cash, and Charlie's Angels: Full Throttle.

Bigfoot has also been a prominent part of animated TV series. Bigfoot and the Muscle Machines was a 1985 animated miniseries produced by Marvel Productions as part of their Super Sunday anthology series. A self-aware version of Bigfoot was one of the main characters of the animated series, The Power Team; it was included to advertise the NES game. A Discovery Kids TV series called Bigfoot Presents: Meteor and the Mighty Monster Trucks was released in 2006.

== Legacy ==
Bigfoot was listed by Hot Rod magazine as one of 100 most influential vehicles in the history of hot rodding for its February 2009 issue, it was ranked 69th.

The truck also entered the International Monster Truck Hall of Fame in 2011.

== See also ==
- List of monster trucks
