= United States Hot Rod Association =

US motorsport sanctioning body

The United States Hot Rod Association (USHRA) was an organization that sanctioned various motorsports. These included the Monster Jam monster truck series as well as motocross, quad racing and others. Having passed through multiple owners, the rights to the group are now owned by Feld Entertainment, which continues to operate the Monster Jam series.

== History ==
The USHRA was founded as "Truck-O-Rama" in the late 1970s by Bob George, Ed Thayer, and Tony Vaccaro. By the early 1980s, the company became known as SRO Motorsports, and began promoting events under the USHRA banner. The early events focused on tractor pulling and mud bogging, and were primarily held in stadiums and arenas. Often, specialty vehicles were booked for events as intermission entertainment between competitions. In 1982, one such vehicle, Bob Chandler's Bigfoot, was booked for an event at the Pontiac Silverdome. It was that event, during which Bigfoot drove over a pair of cars in its first stadium car crush, that launched the phenomenon of monster trucks.

In 1985, USHRA held their first monster truck racing event, The Battle of the Monster Trucks, at the Louisiana Superdome. Up to this point, monster trucks had only performed freestyle exhibitions, and although for several years exhibitions would be a part of smaller arena shows, racing became used in all events by the early 1990s.

Although monster trucks grew in popularity throughout the 1980s, tractor pulling and mud bogging (subsequently known as "mud racing") remained marquee events. Popular pullers included Art Arfons, who competed with the "Green Monster" unlimited tractor, David Willoughby, who pulled with his reputable "Back in Time" modified four-wheel-drive truck, Kenneth and Paula Geuin's Black Gold and Oklahoman four-wheel-drive trucks, Allen Gaines, who had an entire fleet of "Orange Blossom Special" truck pullers, and Gary Collins and his "Budweiser Boss" semi-truck. In mud racing, Tom Martin's "Mud Patrol" and "Super Trooper" police-themed vehicles dominated for several years, while a young Tom Meents began his rise to fame in the "Shake Me" machine.

In 1991, the parent company, now known as SRO/Pace, bought out competitor TNT Motorsports, and in the process acquired the rights to promote events at several more venues, as well as the booking rights to several of their best known trucks, including Carolina Crusher, Equalizer, and, most notably, Grave Digger. These trucks all competed in the "Camel Mud & Monster Series", which ran from 1990 to 1994. By the end of the Camel series, monster trucks were the headlining competitors.

In 1993, USHRA produced the syndicated television show "Monster Wars", which was controversial for its implementation of professional wrestling style characters representing the monster trucks. This was also the year that some events began to be promoted with the name "Monster Jam", which would become the official series name in 1995. 1998 saw competitor USA Motorsports bought out by USHRA's parent, now known as Pace Motorsports, which led to Monster Jam events being shown on TNN's Motor Madness television show from the late 1990s to the early 2000s.

In 1998, Pace was bought by SFX Entertainment, which was bought in turn by Clear Channel in 2000. The live events division of Clear Channel was split off as Live Nation in 2005, and the motorsports division was sold to Feld Entertainment in 2008. Under Feld ownership, all events except Monster Jam and the AMA Supercross Championship, which is sanctioned by the American Motorcyclist Association, have been discontinued, and the USHRA name has largely been phased out in favor of the better known Monster Jam name.

== See also ==
- International Hot Rod Association
