= Brian Lara Cricket (series) =

- Gameplay from Brian Lara International Cricket 2007, the sixth game of the series
- Genre: Sports
- Developer: Codemasters
- Publisher: Codemasters
- Platforms: MS-DOS, Mega Drive, Amiga, PlayStation, Windows, PlayStation 2, Xbox, PlayStation Vita
- First release: Brian Lara Cricket; 1994
- Latest release: Brian Lara Pressure Play; 2007

Brian Lara Cricket is a series of six cricket video games that are endorsed by the West Indian cricketer Brian Lara and published by Codemasters.

== Games ==
As of 2007, there are six games in the Brian Lara Cricket series on eight video game systems, spanning thirteen years.

=== Brian Lara Cricket ===
Brian Lara Cricket is the first game in the series to be endorsed by Brian Lara. It was developed by Audiogenic and published by Codemasters in 1994 for MS-DOS and then a year later in 1995 for the Mega Drive and Amiga.

=== Brian Lara Cricket '96 ===
Also known as Lara '96, this game is a new version of Brian Lara Cricket on the Mega Drive with updated player names and statistics. It is the final game in the series to be developed by Audiogenic and was published by Codemasters in 1996.

=== Brian Lara Cricket '99 ===
Released in 1999, this was the first 3D accelerated game in the series. It was the first fifth generation game in the series, developed and shipped by Codemasters for the Sony PlayStation and Windows platforms with commentary provided by Geoffrey Boycott and Jonathan Agnew. This game was also branded as Shane Warne Cricket '99 in Australia and New Zealand.

=== Brian Lara International Cricket 2005 ===
Developed by Swordfish Studios for Codemasters, Brian Lara International Cricket 2005 is a 6th generation console game for the PlayStation 2, Xbox and Windows. It was released to coincide with the 2005 Ashes series. BLIC 2005 builds on the 3D environment that was first introduced in Brian Lara Cricket '99 and enhances it with rendered crowds and detailed stadia. It was released in Australia as Ricky Ponting International Cricket 2005.

=== Brian Lara International Cricket 2007 ===
Brian Lara International Cricket 2007

Off the success of BLIC2005, Brian Lara International Cricket 2007 was developed. Using the same release date tactics as the previous game, it was shipped during the 2007 Cricket World Cup. The game was available for the PlayStation 2 and Xbox 360 consoles, as well as for Windows. This version includes many graphical as well as gameplay improvements. The Xbox 360 version is the first console port in the series to be in high definition widescreen. Gameplay improvements include analogue direction control when batting, this allows the player to attempt to hit the ball in any direction. In India, it was released as Yuvraj Singh International Cricket 2007. It was also the second game in the Ricky Ponting international series.

=== Brian Lara Pressure Play ===
Brian Lara Pressure Play is a PlayStation Portable-only version of the game, released in 2007.

== History ==
In 1985, Michael McLean at Audiogenic, a subsidiary of Supersoft wrote Graham Gooch's Test Cricket for the C64 computer system. The game sold well and received high ratings, and so Audiogenic followed it up with Graham Gooch's All Star Cricket in 1987. The game that was to become Graham Gooch World Class Cricket was scheduled to be released for the Amiga and Atari ST in 1991, but development was delayed to ensure quality. When it did eventually appear in 1993 it was a huge success, reaching No.1 in the Amiga charts. A PC version followed a year later.

In 1994 Audiogenic identified an opportunity to capitalise on the success of Brian Lara, who had broken two long-standing world records, and rebranded World Class Cricket game as Brian Lara Cricket, initially for MS-DOS but also later for the Amiga. A year later Audiogenic licensed Brian Lara Cricket for the Mega Drive to Codemasters. It was successful and spent 10 weeks at No.1 in the UK video games chart during the summer of 1995. Brian Lara Cricket '96 was released the following year in 1996 also by Codemasters, and it too got to No.1 in the charts. In late 1996 Codemasters acquired the Audiogenic development and Brian Lara Cricket '99 for the PlayStation console was released in 1998.

In 2005 Codemasters released Brian Lara International Cricket 2005 for the PlayStation 2 console, released on 21 July to coincide with the start of the 2005 Ashes series. The game received high ratings. Off the back of this success, Codemasters has developed Brian Lara International Cricket 2007 which was released in March 2007, to coincide with the Cricket World Cup. Brian Lara Pressure Play followed in August for the PSP, reaching No.1 in its first week on release.

With Brian Lara's retirement from professional cricket in 2007 Codemasters moved away from using Lara in the title. The next cricket game released by the publisher was Ashes Cricket 2009 in August 2009, which continues with the same playing style as the Brian Lara series of cricket games. Codemasters has released the latest International Cricket 2010 on in June 2010 as a sequel to the Ashes Cricket 2009. The Cricket series is moving on after Brian Lara's retirement and re-branding of the video games series.

== See also ==
- International Cricket 2010
- Ashes Cricket 2009
- Graham Gooch's Test Cricket
- Graham Gooch World Class Cricket
