= Brian Lara 2007 Pressure Play =

2007 video game

- Developer(s): Acheron Design, IR Gurus
- Publisher(s): Codemasters
- Designer(s): Codemasters
- Series: Brian Lara Cricket
- Platform(s): PlayStation Portable
- Release: EU: August 31, 2007; AU: October 4, 2007
- Genre(s): Sports
- Mode(s): Single-player, multiplayer

Brian Lara 2007 Pressure Play, released in Australia and New Zealand as Ricky Ponting 2007 Pressure Play, is a PlayStation Portable game that was released on 31 August 2007. It is a cricket game endorsed by West Indian cricketer Brian Lara. It follows Brian Lara International Cricket 2007 that was released in March, earlier in the year. It is the first of the Brian Lara Cricket series to be released on a portable console.

== Gameplay ==
Gameplay is much the same as Brian Lara International Cricket 2007 but is lacking most game modes apart from the ICC Cricket World Cup 2007. As with the former, BLPP introduces a number of slight improvements over Brian Lara International Cricket 2005. Examples include the ability to return the ball to either end of the pitch, and the option to simulate an over, an innings, or an entire game. However, unlike Brian Lara International Cricket 2007, there is no ability to play sweep shots, or to charge down the wicket. It is thus impossible to be stumped while batting in this game.

== Reception ==
Brian Lara 2007 Pressure Play has a score of 68, "mixed or average reviews" on Metacritic. A GameSpot reviewer highlights the lack of gameplay modes causing the game to lack longevity. In the same review, the graphics are praised for having smooth and natural animations, but the closeups of the players look strange as their heads look oversized. Other critics brought attention to the AI, which they said is the same independent of the difficulty settings that the player puts the game in. Despite the mixed or average reviews, BLPP went into the game charts straight to position 1 in its first week. Also, reviewers cited long load times as there are loading times to enter a match, after the coin toss, after each over and bowling change.

The following are scores collected by GameRankings which give the game an average ratio of 71%.

Publication	Score
GameSpot	6.5 of 10
Pro-G	6.0 of 10
Games Master UK	78 of 100
PlayStation 2 Magazine UKikuuil	8 of 10
PSM3 Magazine UK	70 of 100
PlayStation Official Magazine UK	6 of 10
