= Hawk-Eye =

Computer vision system

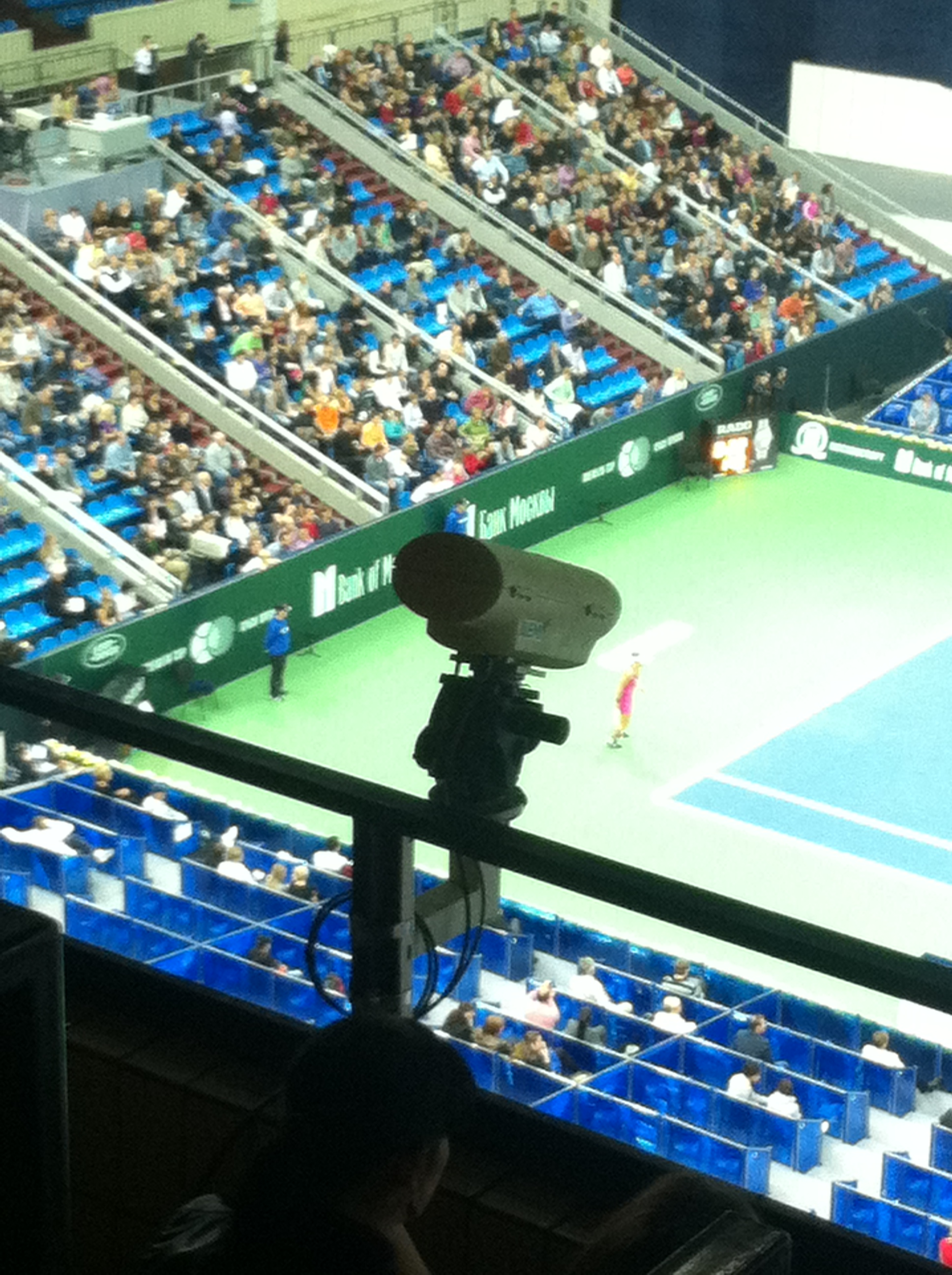
Hawk-Eye camera system at the Kremlin Cup tennis tournament on 20 October 2012, Moscow

Hawk-Eye is a computer vision system used to visually track the trajectory of a ball and display a profile of its statistically most likely path as a moving image. It is used in more than 20 major sports, including baseball, cricket, tennis, badminton, hurling, rugby union, soccer, Gaelic football, American football, and volleyball.

The Sony-owned Hawk-Eye system was originally developed in the United Kingdom by Paul Hawkins. The system was first implemented in 2001 for television broadcasts, where it was used to analyze leg before wicket decisions in cricket. It works via the use of up to ten high-performance cameras, normally positioned on the underside of the stadium roof, which track the ball from different angles. The video from the cameras is then triangulated and combined to create a three-dimensional representation of the ball's trajectory. Although not infallible, Hawk-Eye is advertised to be accurate to within 2.6 mm (100 thou).

Hawk-Eye is increasingly used as an impartial review in sports, having been accepted by governing bodies in tennis, cricket, and association football (soccer) as a means of adjudication. Hawk-Eye has been used for the Challenge System since 2006 in tennis and Decision Review System in cricket since 2009. The system are is also used to determine whether the ball has crossed the goal line in football as a means of goal-line technology, implemented in the 2013–14 Premier League season and now present at many domestic leagues and international competitions.

== Method of operation ==
All Hawk-Eye systems are based on the principles of triangulation using visual images and timing data provided by a number of high-speed video cameras located at different locations and angles around the area of play. For tennis there are 10 cameras. The system rapidly processes the video feeds from the cameras and ball tracker. A data store contains a predefined model of the playing area and includes data on the rules of the game.

In each frame sent from each camera, the system identifies the group of pixels which corresponds to the image of the ball. It then calculates for each frame the position of the ball by comparing its position on at least two of the physically separate cameras at the same instant in time. A succession of frames builds up a record of the path along which the ball has travelled. It also "predicts" the future flight path of the ball and where it will interact with any of the playing area features already programmed into the database. The system can also interpret these interactions to decide infringements of the rules of the game.

The system generates a graphic image of the ball path and playing area, which means that information can be provided to judges, television viewers or coaching staff in near real-time.

The tracking system is combined with a back-end database and archiving capabilities so that it is possible to extract and analyse trends and statistics about individual players, games, ball-to-ball comparisons, etc.

== History ==
Hawk-Eye was developed in 2000 by engineers at Roke Manor Research Limited, then a Siemens subsidiary in Romsey, England. Paul Hawkins and David Sherry submitted a United Kingdom patent application for the technology, but this was subsequently withdrawn. All of the technology and intellectual property was spun off into a separate company, Hawk-Eye Innovations Ltd, based in Winchester, Hampshire. This was initially established as a joint venture between Roke Manor Research and Sunset + Vine. At the time, Sunset + Vine produced the Channel 4 television cricket coverage where Hawk-Eye was first used.

On 14 June 2006 a group of investors—led by the Wisden Group and that included Mark Getty, a member of the wealthy American family and business dynasty—bought the company for £4.4m. The acquisition was intended to strengthen Wisden's presence in cricket and allow it to enter tennis and other international sports, with Hawk-Eye working on implementing a system for basketball. According to Hawk-Eye's website, the system produces much more data than that shown on television.

Put up for sale in September 2010, it was sold as a complete entity to Japanese electronic giant Sony in March 2011 in a deal that valued the company at £15m-£20m.

== Deployment in sport ==
=== Cricket ===
The technology was first used by Channel 4 during a Test match between England and Pakistan on Lord's Cricket Ground, on 21 May 2001. It is used by the majority of television networks to track the trajectory of balls in flight. Its major use in cricket broadcasting is in analysing leg before wicket (LBW) decisions, where the likely path of the ball can be projected forward, through the batsman's legs, to see if it would have hit the stumps.

In the winter season of 2008/2009 the ICC trialled a referral system where Hawk-Eye was used for referring decisions to the third umpire if a team disagreed with an LBW decision. Initially the third umpire was able to look at what the ball actually did up to the point when it hit the batsman, but could not look at the predicted flight of the ball after it hit the batsman. The third umpire is now able to see the projected path of the ball too, and Hawk-Eye is currently sanctioned in international cricket even though some doubts remain about its accuracy.

When an LBW decision is referred to Hawk-Eye, it assists in assessing against three criteria:

- Where the ball pitched (in particular with respect to the stumps)
- The location of impact on the leg of the batsman (in particular with respect to the stumps)
- The projected path of the ball past the batsman

In all three cases, marginal calls result in the on-field umpire's call being maintained.

Due to its real-time coverage of bowling speed, the system is also used to show delivery patterns of a bowler's behaviour such as line and length, or swing/turn information. At the end of an over, all six deliveries are often shown simultaneously to illustrate a bowler's variations, such as slower deliveries, bouncers and leg-cutters. A complete record of a bowler can also be shown over the course of a match.

Batsmen also benefit from the analysis of Hawk-Eye, as a record can be brought up of the deliveries from which a batsman scored. These are often shown as a 2-D silhouetted figure of a batsman and colour-coded dots of the balls faced by the batsman. Information such as the exact spot where the ball pitches or speed of the ball from the bowler's hand (to gauge batsman reaction time) can also help in post-match analysis.

=== Tennis ===
For a history of electronic line calling in tennis, see Electronic line judge

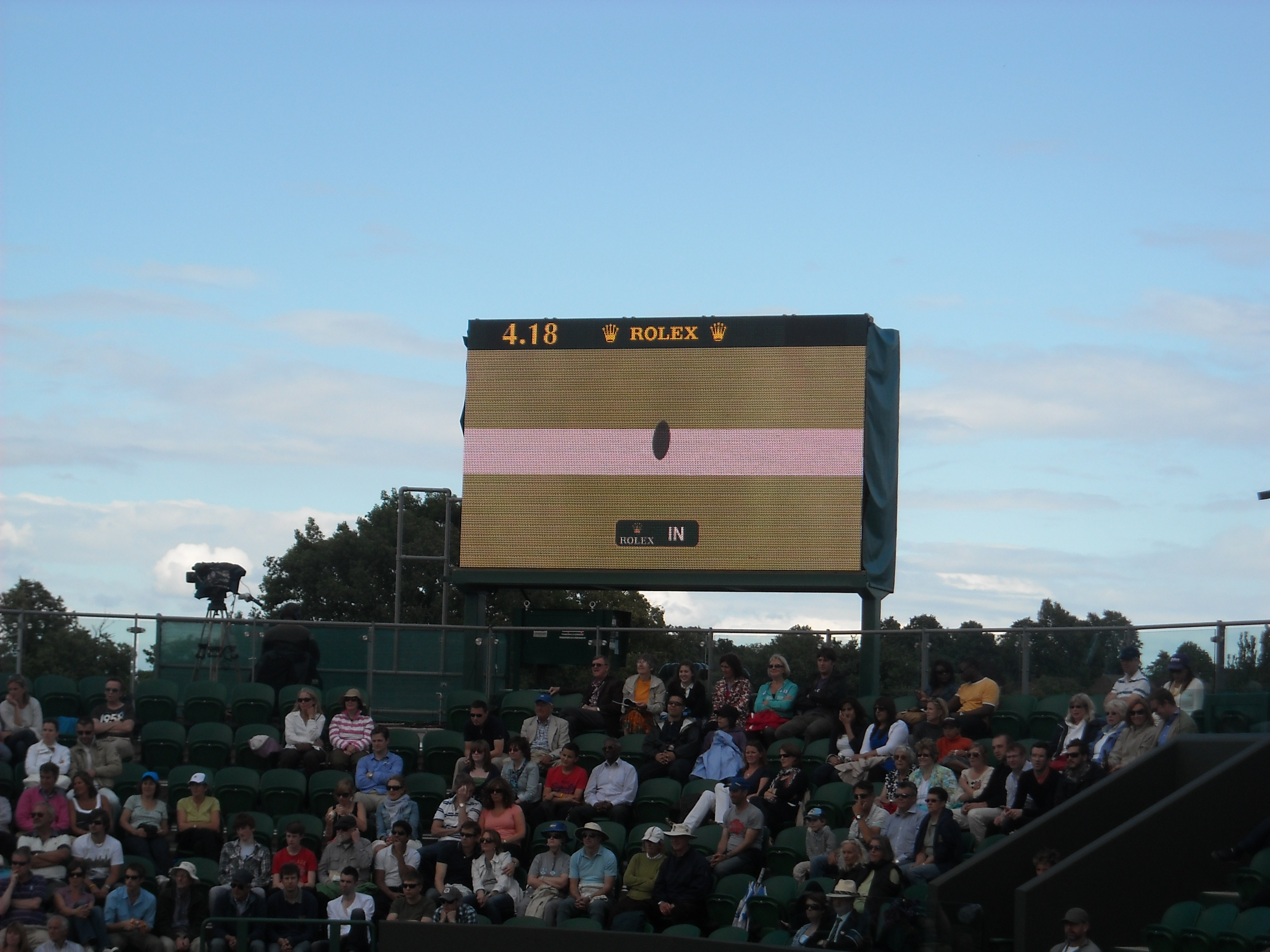
Hawk-Eye decision shown on the big screen at Wimbledon.

In Serena Williams's quarter final loss to Jennifer Capriati at the 2004 US Open, three line calls went against Williams in the final set (an Auto-Ref system was being tested during the match). Though the calls were not reversed, there was one overrule of a clearly incorrect line umpire call, by the chair umpire Mariana Alves, that the TV replay showed to be good. These errors prompted talks about line calling assistance especially as the Auto-Ref system was being tested by the U.S. Open at that time and was shown to be very accurate.

In late 2006 Hawk-Eye was tested by the International Tennis Federation (ITF) in New York City and was passed for professional use. Hawk-Eye reported that the New York tests involved 80 shots being measured by the ITF's high speed camera, a device similar to MacCAM. During an early test of the system at an exhibition tennis tournament in Australia (seen on local TV), there was an instance when the tennis ball was shown as "Out", but the accompanying word was "In". This was explained to be an error in the way the tennis ball was shown on the graphical display as a circle, rather than as an ellipse. This was immediately corrected.

Hawk-Eye has been used in television coverage of several major tennis tournaments, including Wimbledon, the Queen's Club Championships, the Australian Open, the Davis Cup and the Tennis Masters Cup. The US Open Tennis Championship announced they would make official use of the technology for the 2006 US Open where each player receives two challenges per set. It is also used as part of a larger tennis simulation implemented by IBM called PointTracker.

The 2006 Hopman Cup in Perth, Western Australia, was the first elite-level tennis tournament where players were allowed to challenge point-ending line calls, which were then reviewed by the referees using Hawk-Eye technology. It used 10 cameras feeding information about ball position to the computers. Jamea Jackson was the first player to challenge a call using the system.

In March 2006, at the Nasdaq-100 Open in Key Biscayne, Florida, Hawk-Eye was used officially for the first time at a tennis tour event. Later that year, the US Open became the first grand-slam tournament to use the system during play, allowing players to challenge line calls.

The 2007 Australian Open was the next grand-slam event to implement Hawk-Eye in challenges to line calls, where each tennis player in Rod Laver Arena was allowed two incorrect challenges per set and one additional challenge should a tiebreak be played. In the event of an advantage final set, challenges were reset to two for each player every 12 games, i.e. 6-all, 12-all, etc. Controversies followed the event as at times Hawk-Eye produced erroneous output. In 2008, tennis players were allowed three incorrect challenges per set instead. Any leftover challenges did not carry over to the next set. Once, Amélie Mauresmo challenged a ball that was called in, and Hawk-Eye showed the ball was out by less than a millimetre, but the call was allowed to stand. As a result, the point was replayed and Mauresmo did not lose an incorrect challenge.

The Hawk-Eye technology used in the 2007 Dubai Tennis Championships had some minor controversies. Defending champion Rafael Nadal accused the system of incorrectly declaring an out ball to be in following his exit. The umpire had called a ball out; when Mikhail Youzhny challenged the decision, Hawk-Eye said it was in by 3 mm. Youzhny said after that he himself thought the mark may have been wide but then offered that this kind of technology error could easily have been made by linesmen and umpires. Nadal could only shrug, saying that had this system been on clay, the mark would have clearly shown Hawk-Eye to be wrong.

The 2007 Wimbledon Championships also implemented the Hawk-Eye system as an officiating aid on Centre Court and Court 1, and each tennis player was allowed three incorrect challenges per set. If the set produced a tiebreak, each player was given an additional challenge. Additionally, in the event of a final set (third set in women's or mixed matches, fifth set in men's matches), where there is no tiebreak, each player's number of challenges was reset to three if the game score reached 6–6, and again at 12–12. Teymuraz Gabashvili, in his first round match against Roger Federer, made the first-ever Hawk-Eye challenge on Centre Court. Additionally, during the finals of Federer against Rafael Nadal, Nadal challenged a shot which was called out. Hawk-Eye showed the ball as in, just clipping the line. The reversal agitated Federer enough for him to request (unsuccessfully) that the umpire turn off the Hawk-Eye technology for the remainder of the match.

In the 2009 Australian Open fourth round match between Roger Federer and Tomáš Berdych, Berdych challenged an out call. The Hawk-Eye system was not available when he challenged, likely due to a particularly pronounced shadow on the court. As a result, the original call stood.

In the 2009 Indian Wells Masters quarterfinals match between Ivan Ljubičić and Andy Murray, Murray challenged an out call. The Hawk-Eye system indicated that the ball landed on the centre of the line despite instant replay images showing that the ball was clearly out. It was later revealed that the Hawk-Eye system had mistakenly picked up the second bounce, which was on the line, instead of the first bounce of the ball. Immediately after the match, Murray apologised to Ljubicic for the call, and acknowledged that the point was out.

The Hawk-Eye system was developed as a replay system, originally for TV broadcast coverage. As such, it initially could not call ins and outs live.The representation of the trajectory results in terms of where the ball lands is called Shot Spot.

The Hawk-Eye Innovations website states that the system performs with an average error of 3.6 mm. The standard diameter of a tennis ball is 67 mm, equating to a 5% error relative to ball diameter. This is roughly equivalent to the fluff on the ball.

Hawk-Eye has developed a technology called 'Hawk-Eye Live', which uses the 10 cameras to call shots in or out in real time, with an 'out' call being signified by a speaker emitting an 'out' sound that emulates a human line judge. The technology was initially expected to be in place for the 2019 US Open. The 2021 Australian Open was the first Grand Slam tournament to use Hawk-Eye Live for all matches in place of line judges, in part to reduce personnel during the COVID-19 pandemic, followed by the US Open later that year. Previously, the 2020 US Open used Hawk-Eye in place of line judges for all matches except those held at Arthur Ashe Stadium and Louis Armstrong Stadium.

Clay court tournaments, notably the French Open, are generally free of Hawk-Eye technology due to marks left on the clay where the ball bounced to evidence a disputed line call. Chair umpires are then required to get out of their seat and examine the mark on court with the player by their side to discuss the chair umpire's decision. The 2021 Mutua Madrid Open became the first major tournament on clay to use an electronic system to check the bounce of the ball on the court when in doubt in the two main stadiums (Manolo Santana Stadium and Arantxa Sánchez Vicario Stadium at Caja Mágica). The system was developed by FoxTenn, a Spanish company located in Barcelona. It uses real images of the ball captured by 40 cameras located at ground level, synchronized with lasers and working at up to 3,000 images per second to determine whether it has bounced in or out of the court's limits. This system was previously used at the 2020 Rio Open in Rio de Janeiro and at the 2021 MUSC Health Women's Open in Charleston, South Carolina.

==== Unification of rules ====
Until March 2008, the International Tennis Federation (ITF), Association of Tennis Professionals (ATP), Women's Tennis Association (WTA), Grand Slam Committee, and several individual tournaments had conflicting rules on how Hawk-Eye was to be utilised. A key example of this was the number of challenges a player was permitted per set, which varied among events. Some tournaments allowed players a greater margin for error, with players allowed an unlimited numbers of challenges over the course of a match. In other tournaments players received two or three per set. On 19 March 2008, the aforementioned organizing bodies announced a uniform system of rules: three unsuccessful challenges per set, with an additional challenge if the set reaches a tiebreak. In an advantage set (a set with no tiebreak) players are allowed three unsuccessful challenges every 12 games. The next scheduled event on the men and women's tour, the 2008 Sony Ericsson Open, was the first event to implement these new, standardized rules.

==== Replacement of human line judges ====
Since 2021 the Australian Open has used Hawk-Eye to call lines in all games. The US Open replaced line judges with full electronic line calls in 2022. On 9 October 2024 the All-England Club announced that electronic line calling would replace human line judges full-time at Wimbledon starting in 2025.

=== Association football ===
Hawk-Eye is one of the goal-line technology (GLT) systems authorised by FIFA. Hawk-Eye tracks the ball, and informs the referee if a ball fully crosses the goal line into the goal. The purpose of the system is to eliminate errors in assessing if a goal was scored. The Hawk-Eye system was one of the systems trialled by the sport's governors prior to the 2012 change to the Laws of the Game that made GLT a permanent part of the game, and it has been used in various competitions since then. GLT is not compulsory and, owing to the cost of Hawk-Eye and its competitors, systems are only deployed in a few high-level competitions.

As of July 2017, licensed Hawk-Eye systems were installed at 96 stadiums. By number of installations, Hawk-Eye is the most popular GLT system. Hawk-Eye is the system used in the Premier League, Serie A and Bundesliga among other leagues.

=== Snooker ===
At the 2007 World Snooker Championship, the BBC used Hawk-Eye for the first time in its television coverage to show player views, particularly of potential snookers. It has also been used to demonstrate intended shots by players when the actual shot has gone awry. It is now used by the BBC at every World Championship, as well as some other major tournaments. The BBC used to use the system sporadically, for instance in the 2009 Masters at Wembley the Hawk-Eye was at most used once or twice per frame.

After introduction, its usage on BBC events decreased significantly and, for a period of time, was only used within the World Championships, before being removed after 2015. In contrast to tennis, Hawk-Eye is never used in snooker to assist referees' decisions and primarily used to assist viewers in showing what the player is facing.

Hawk-Eye, or a derivative of it, is now only used on the World Snooker Tour for events played in China, where the technology has evolved from a television aid for showing the distance of a long pot, to being used to support referees in replacing balls to millimetre precision after a “foul-and-a-miss”. This technology has been repeatedly praised by players and commentators for speeding up the ball replacement process, but its cost is referenced as a reason for the technology not being used across all tournaments: unlike tennis, the use of technology like this is not mandated by the tour administrators, being an aid provided by the television broadcaster which is often restricted to the televised table.

=== Gaelic games ===
In Ireland, Hawk-Eye was introduced for all championship matches at Croke Park in Dublin in 2013. This followed consideration by the Gaelic Athletic Association (GAA) for its use in Gaelic football and hurling. A trial took place at Croke Park on 2 April 2011. The double-header featured football between Dublin and Down and hurling between Dublin and Kilkenny. Over the previous two seasons there had been many calls for the technology to be adopted, especially from Kildare fans, who saw two high-profile decisions go against their team in important games. The GAA said it would review the issue after the 2013 Sam Maguire Cup was presented.

Hawk-Eye's use was intended to eliminate contentious scores. Its first use in the championship came on Saturday 1 June 2013 for the Kildare v Offaly game, part of a double header with a second game of Dublin v Westmeath. Hawk-Eye determined that Offaly substitute Peter Cunningham's attempted point had gone wide 10 minutes into the second half.

Use of Hawk-Eye was suspended during the 2013 All-Ireland SHC semi-finals on 18 August due to a human error during a minor (under-18) hurling game between Limerick and Galway. During the minor game, Hawk-Eye ruled a point for Limerick as a miss although the graphic showed the ball passing inside the posts, causing confusion around the stadium – the referee ultimately waved the valid point wide provoking anger from fans, viewers and TV analysts covering the game live. The system was subsequently stood down for the senior game which followed, owing to "an inconsistency in the generation of a graphic". Limerick, who were narrowly defeated after extra-time, announced they would be appealing over Hawk-Eye's costly failure. Hawk-Eye apologised for this incident and admitted that it was a result of human error. The incident drew attention from the UK, where Hawk-Eye had made its debut in English football's Premier League the day before.

Hawk-Eye was introduced to a second venue, Semple Stadium, Thurles, in 2016. There is no TV screen at Semple: instead, an electronic screen displays a green Tá if a score has been made, and a red Níl if the shot is wide. It was used at a third venue, Páirc Uí Chaoimh, Cork, in July 2017, for the All-Ireland SHC quarter-finals between Clare versus Tipperary and Wexford versus Waterford.

Hawk-Eye was at the centre of several contentious decisions during the first half of the first 2022 All-Ireland SFC semi-final between Derry and Galway. This led to its suspension for the second half of that game, the referee being forced to alter the score and, later, Hawk-Eye's suspension for the second All-Ireland SFC semi-final between Dublin and Kerry. The GAA confirmed on 15 July that Hawk-Eye would return for the All-Ireland SHC final, following comprehensive testing and a full review of the score detection technology.

Hawk-Eye malfunctioned again during the 2023 All-Ireland SFC quarter-final clash between Armagh and Monaghan after it returned a "data unavailable" message. The GAA requested an explanation from Hawk-Eye who concluded that the message was a result of operator error. The next day the GAA took the decision to stand down Hawk-Eye once again.

No official Irish-language term exists, although some publications have used the direct translation Súil an tSeabhaic.

=== Australian football ===
On 4 July 2013, the Australian Football League announced that they would be testing Hawk Eye technology to be used in the Score Review process. Hawk Eye was used for all matches played at the MCG during Round 15 of the 2013 AFL Season. The AFL also announced that Hawk Eye was only being tested, and would not be used in any Score Reviews during the round.

=== Badminton ===
BWF introduced Hawk-Eye technology in 2014 after testing other instant review technologies for line call decision in BWF major events. Hawk-Eye's tracking cameras are also used to provide shuttlecock speed and other insight in badminton matches. Hawk-Eye was formally introduced in 2014 India Super Series tournament.

=== Gridiron football ===
The National Football League adopted Hawk-Eye for virtual on-field measurements beginning in the 2025 season.

=== Baseball ===
Hawk-Eye is used to automatically call balls and strikes (either in conjunction with, or in lieu of, a human umpire) in professional baseball leagues in the U.S. and South Korea. In the U.S., the system began use in Major League Baseball (MLB) for the 2026 season, having been previously tested in Minor League Baseball since 2019. Hawk-Eye has also been used for instant replay reviews in MLB since the 2014 season.

== Concerns about accuracy ==
Hawk-Eye is now familiar to sport fans around the world for the views it brings into sports like cricket and tennis. Although this new technology has for the most part been embraced, it has received criticism from some quarters. In the 2007 Wimbledon Championships a shot that appeared to be out, was called by Hawk-Eye as in by 1 mm, a distance smaller than the advertised mean error of 3.6 mm. Some commentators have criticised the system's 3.6 mm statistical margin of error as too large. Others have noted that while 3.6 mm is extraordinarily accurate, this margin of error is only for the witnessed trajectory of the ball. In 2008, an article in a peer-reviewed journal consolidated many of these doubts. The authors acknowledged the value of the system, but noted that it was probably fallible to some extent, and that its failure to depict a margin of error gave a spurious depiction of events. The authors also argued that the probable limits to its accuracy were not acknowledged by players, officials, commentators or spectators. They hypothesised that Hawk-Eye may struggle with predicting the trajectory of a cricket ball after bouncing: the time between a ball bouncing and striking the batsman may be too short to generate the three frames (at least) needed to plot a curve accurately.

== Use in computer games ==
The use of the Hawk-Eye brand and simulation has been licensed to Codemasters for use in the video game Brian Lara International Cricket 2005 to make the game appear more like television coverage, and subsequently in Brian Lara International Cricket 2007, Ashes Cricket 2009 and International Cricket 2010. A similar version of the system has since been incorporated into the Xbox 360 version of Smash Court Tennis 3, but it is not present in the PSP version of the game, although it does feature a normal challenge of the ball which does not use the Hawk-Eye feature. It is also featured (called Big Eye) in Don Bradman Cricket 14 and Don Bradman Cricket 17.

== Competition ==
Cyclops is a computer system which has been used on the ATP and WTA professional tennis tours as an electronic line judge since 1980, now superseded by Hawk-Eye at Grand Slam tournaments.

FoxTenn is another competing system for electronic line judge calling which uses real data to trace back ball path and marking, including on clay surfaces.

== See also ==
- Cricket clothing and equipment
- Electronic line judge
- Cyclops
- Hot Spot (cricket)
- Umpire Decision Review System
- Virtual Eye
