= Graham Gooch =

English cricketer (born 1953)

Graham Gooch OBE DL
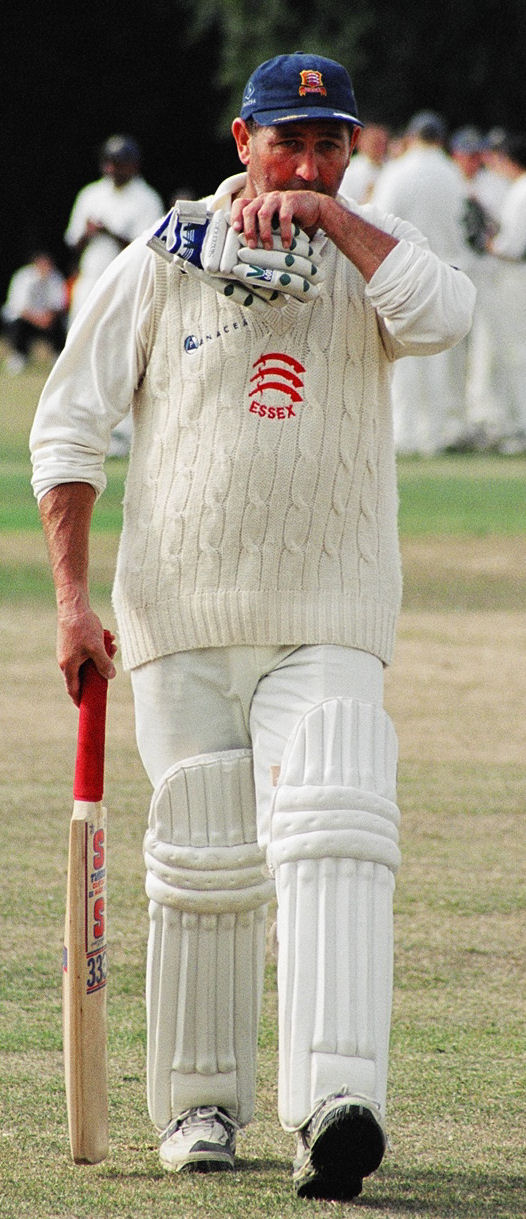
- Gooch in 1997

Personal information
- Full name: Graham Alan Gooch
- Born: 23 July 1953 (age 73); Whipps Cross, Essex, England
- Nickname: Zap, Goochie
- Height: 6 ft 0 in (1.83 m)
- Batting: Right-handed
- Bowling: Right-arm medium
- Role: Batsman

International information
- National side: England (1975–1995)
- Test debut (cap 461): 10 July 1975 v Australia
- Last Test: 3 February 1995 v Australia
- ODI debut (cap 34): 26 August 1976 v West Indies
- Last ODI: 10 January 1995 v Australia

Domestic team information
- Years: Team
- 1973–1997: Essex
- 1982/83–1983/84: Western Province

Career statistics
Competition	Test	ODI	FC	LA
Matches	118	125	581	614
Runs scored	8,900	4,290	44,846	22,211
Batting average	42.58	36.98	49.01	40.16
100s/50s	20/46	8/23	128/217	44/139
Top score	333	142	333	198*
Balls bowled	2,655	2,066	18,785	14,314
Wickets	23	36	246	310
Bowling average	46.47	42.11	34.37	31.15
5 wickets in innings	0	0	3	1
10 wickets in match	0	0	0	0
Best bowling	3/39	3/19	7/14	5/8
Catches/stumpings	103/–	45/–	555/–	261/–
Medal record
Men's Cricket
Representing England
ICC Cricket World Cup
Runner-up	1979 England
Runner-up	1987 India and Pakistan
Runner-up	1992 Australia and New Zealand
- Source: CricInfo, 7 December 2007

Graham Alan Gooch, OBE, DL (born 23 July 1953) is a former English first-class cricketer who captained Essex and England. He was one of the most successful international batsmen of his generation, and through a career spanning from 1973 until 1997, he became the most prolific run scorer of all time, with 67,057 runs across first-class and limited-overs games. His List A cricket tally of 22,211 runs is also a record. In 1992, he became the first cricketer to lose 3 finals of the Cricket World Cup and is currently the only such player. He is one of only twenty-five players to have scored over 100 first-class centuries. He was a part of the English squads which finished as runners-up at the 1979 Cricket World Cup, as runners-up at the 1987 Cricket World Cup and as runners-up at the 1992 Cricket World Cup.

Internationally, despite being banned for three years following a rebel tour to ostracized South Africa, Gooch is the third highest Test run scorer for England. His playing years spanned much of the period of domination by the West Indies, against whom his mid-forties batting average is regarded as extremely creditable. His score of 154 against them at Headingley in 1991 is regarded as one of the greatest centuries of all time by many critics and former players. His career-best score of 333 came against India at Lord's. In that match, he also scored a century in the second innings, 123, for a match total of 456, which remains the highest aggregate in a test match. He was the first player to make 20 Test appearances at Lord's. As captain, Matthew Engel noted, "his fanatical fitness and work-ethic gave the team more purpose than it had shown in a decade."

After 118 Tests, aged 42, he retired into coaching and as team selector, before becoming a commentator. In 2009 he was inducted into the ICC Cricket Hall of Fame. He returned to coach Essex, before becoming England batting coach in 2012.

== Overview ==
Gooch was born in Whipps Cross University Hospital, Leytonstone, London. He was educated at Norlington School for Boys and Leyton County High School for Boys, in Leyton.

Gooch played first-class cricket regularly between 1973 and 1997. Famous for his upright stance, a high bat-lift and heavy bat he became one of the most prolific run scorers top-class cricket has ever seen. On 8 November 2011, he received an honorary award from the University of East London.

== Test cricket ==
=== Early years ===
Gooch made his debut in Test cricket in 1975 at 21 against the touring Australia side captained by Ian Chappell. His debut was not a great success as Gooch got a pair, and England lost the first Test by an innings and 85 runs. In the second Ashes Test in the series he scored 6 and 31 and was then dropped from the side. He was not selected for the Test team again until 1978 (although making his one-day international debut in 1976), when his scoring rate for Essex meant that he could not be ignored and he became a mainstay in the England line-up. On his return to Test cricket he immediately had more success, making a first Test half-century, and 91 not out in his fifth Test, although it was his 22nd Test and five years after his debut before he made his first Test (or any international) century. In 1980 he was awarded the Wisden Cricketer of the Year. His first three Test centuries all came against the West Indies.

Gooch had a further hiatus in his career when he went on the controversial 1982 South African rebel tour, which resulted in all of the players concerned, including Geoff Boycott, Alan Knott and Bob Woolmer, being banned from Test cricket for three years. Geoffrey Boycott was generally perceived as the key player organising the tour party but it was Graham Gooch as captain of the team who gained the most media attention and in some cases vilification. Gooch was not handed the captaincy until the team arrived in South Africa at the beginning of March. It could be argued that more attention was on Gooch however as he was reaching his peak as a Test player, others were in the twilight years of their cricket careers and so the ban was arguably felt more acutely by the captain. Gooch claimed in the film "Out of the Wilderness" that 'others' decided he "had no place in England cricket", hence his decision to join the tour.

=== Later years ===
Upon the expiration of the ban, Gooch was restored to the England team in 1985. Opting to miss the 1986–87 tour of Australia for personal reasons, a severe loss of form resulted in failing to win back his England place for the 1987 summer and Test series against Pakistan – indeed at one stage he was even dropped to the Second XI at Essex, but his form returned at the end of the summer, with a superb century in the MCC Bicentennial match. He returned to the England team for the Cricket World Cup in India and Pakistan, and the subsequent winter tour of Pakistan. His career blossomed later after being appointed captain, a position he held twice: first briefly, at the end of the "summer of four captains" in 1988, as a replacement for the injured Chris Cowdrey (who never played another Test). In his first match (the fifth and last of the series against the West Indies), England at least showed some spirit, taking a first-innings lead for the only time in the series. Gooch's second-innings 84 stood alone as the rest of the batting collapsed, England losing the match (and with it the series 4–0). His second match, the one-off Test against Sri Lanka, was won, and all seemed set fair for Gooch to remain as captain for the tour of India that winter. But that tour was cancelled over the Indian government's refusal to grant visas to the eight players who had sporting links with South Africa, including Gooch himself. David Gower returned as captain for the losing 1989 Ashes series – in which, for a second time, Gooch's loss of form with the bat resulted in his being dropped, by his own request this time.

=== Cricket World Cups ===
Graham Gooch played in 3 different World Cups in 3 decades – the 1979 Cricket World Cup, the 1987 Cricket World Cup, and the 1992 Cricket World Cup. He has the distinction of featuring in the finals of all the three World Cups that he played in. He would probably be best remembered in the competition for the stupendous century in the 1987 semi-final against India at the Wankhede Stadium when he repeatedly swept the spinners to carry England into the final. England made the finals in 1979 in their home ground to take on the West Indies. Gooch top scored with 71 in 83 balls, in the semi final win over New Zealand. The West Indies scored 286 for the loss of 9 wickets in 60 overs with Vivian Richards hammering an unbeaten 138. In reply, England had an impressive start with 129 for no loss. They lost openers Mike Brearley and Geoff Boycott in quick succession but Gooch and Derek Randall held it together. They added 48 runs for the third wicket and once Gooch was castled by Joel Garner on 32, the English side collapsed. From 183 for 2, England were all out for 194, losing the final by 92 runs. In the 1987 Cricket World Cup Final, powered by David Boon's 75, Australia posted 253 for the loss of 5 wickets in 50 overs. The fateful reverse sweep by English skipper Mike Gatting at a crucial moment of the match saw his team losing the way after a good start and England fell short of Australia's score by just 7 runs. Gooch scored 35 off 57 balls as an opener in that match. Gooch was the leading run-scorer in the 1987 Cricket World Cup. In the 1992 Cricket World Cup final, Pakistani skipper Imran Khan won the toss and scored a 72 to propel his team to a formidable 249 for 6 wickets in 50 overs. Gooch had an ordinary outing this time, scoring 29 off 66 balls with just one boundary. They lost to Pakistan by 22 runs. Gooch is the second highest run-scorer for England in World Cups, with 897 runs in 21 innings at an average of 44.85 and strike rate of 63.25. He scored one century and eight fifties. His highest score of 115 was against India in Mumbai in 1987.

=== Full-time captain ===
After Gower's resignation following the 4–0 Ashes defeat of 1989, and the loss of a large number of players with Test experience to a second rebel tour of South Africa under Gatting, Gooch was re-appointed captain for the 1989–90 winter tour of the West Indies. England unexpectedly won the first Test, which was England's first victory over the Windies since 1973 and came close to winning the third Test. However, Gooch suffered a broken hand and missed the rest of the tour – England lost the two remaining matches and the series.

Returning for the summer of 1990, Gooch had a golden summer both as batsman and captain against India and New Zealand, scoring runs seemingly at will. Gooch scored a record 456 runs in the Lord's Test against India in 1990, 333 in the first innings and 123 in the second. Kumar Sangakkara of Sri Lanka (in 2014) is the only other player to score a triple century in the first innings and a century in the second innings. His aggregate of 456 for the match remains a world record for a Test match, as does his aggregate of 752 for the 3-match series. Both series were won, and in 1990 Gooch was awarded the Professional Cricketers' Association Player of the Year.

The winter tour of Australia did not, however, go according to plan, England losing 3–0 despite holding first-innings leads in the first two tests (both of which were lost), although Gooch scored a marvellous hundred chasing an improbable total in the drawn 4th test.

Gooch had a public falling-out with David Gower, the England batsman, particularly after Gower hired a vintage aircraft and 'buzzed' the ground where England was playing during the unsuccessful tour of Australia in 1990/91. Gooch contributed to the decision to omit Gower from England's tour of India in 1993, which proved so controversial that an extraordinary vote of no confidence in the selectors was passed at the MCC. Gower never played another Test, lending an ironic edge to Gooch's surpassing him as England's leading run scorer in the 1993 Ashes series. It is this relationship between the two men that perhaps highlights best the differences between their approaches to the game, as Gower himself identified in 1995 in an interview in The Independent "I was never destined to be on the ball 100 per cent of the time. I don't have the same ability that Graham Gooch has, to produce something very close to his best every time he plays.'

In 1991 at Headingley against the West Indies he scored a match-winning 154 not out, carrying his bat throughout England's second innings against a highly rated pace attack, in overcast conditions on an unpredictable pitch, while only two of his colleagues reached double figures in a total of 252. The veteran sportswriter Frank Keating rated this as the finest Test innings he had ever seen in England. This opinion was backed up by the ICC rankings, which listed it as the highest-ranking innings of all time at any venue. In the rest of the series (drawn 2–2), Gooch was one of England's most consistent run-scorers, although no further centuries followed.

Gooch made a habit of leading by example, his batting average as captain (58.6) being almost twice his average in the ranks (36). New Zealand were beaten in the winter tour of 1991–92, the decisive Second Test including another Gooch century (which he described as his worst ever, but his luckiest). He also led England to the World Cup final later that winter, and batted well during the 1992 series defeat by Pakistan – again, his runs contributing to England's series-levelling victory in the fourth Test.

After the fourth Test match of the 1993 Ashes series, and with England now 3–0 down in the series, he resigned as captain: the job being given to his fellow opening batsman, Mike Atherton. He continued playing for England for a couple of years, notably scoring another double century against New Zealand in 1994, and retired from test cricket as England's all-time highest run scorer. Over his 118 Test career, Gooch played with a record 113 different teammates.

== First-class ==
Gooch made his debut for Essex in 1973 at the age of 19, and played for the county until his retirement as a player in 1997. For Essex, Gooch scored 120 in the 1979 Benson and Hedges Cup final against Surrey, a match which saw Essex win a major domestic trophy for the first time in their history. This heralded a highly successful period for the county, with Gooch a key member of a team that won the county championship six times in the years 1979–1992, and also won every other major domestic trophy at least once in the same period. Gooch holds numerous Essex batting records: in particular he scored the most first-class runs in a season (2559, scored in 1984 while banned from playing for England), and made more first-class centuries (94) for the county than any other player. The Essex record partnership for the second wicket was set by Gooch and Paul Prichard.

Gooch also bowled occasional medium pace, and took over 200 first-class wickets. He could be a prodigious swinger of the ball if conditions suited. In dead matches he could sometimes be seen doing impressions of fellow professionals' bowling styles.

Upon his retirement, Christopher Martin-Jenkins wrote an article in Wisden Cricketers' Almanack arguing that Gooch was the all-time highest run scorer in top level cricket. He scored 44,846 runs in all first-class cricket at an average of 49.01, including 128 centuries. (A number of players have scored more first-class runs.) Martin-Jenkins took into consideration Gooch's List A matches, in which he scored a further 22,211 runs, itself a world record.

== Cricket coach ==
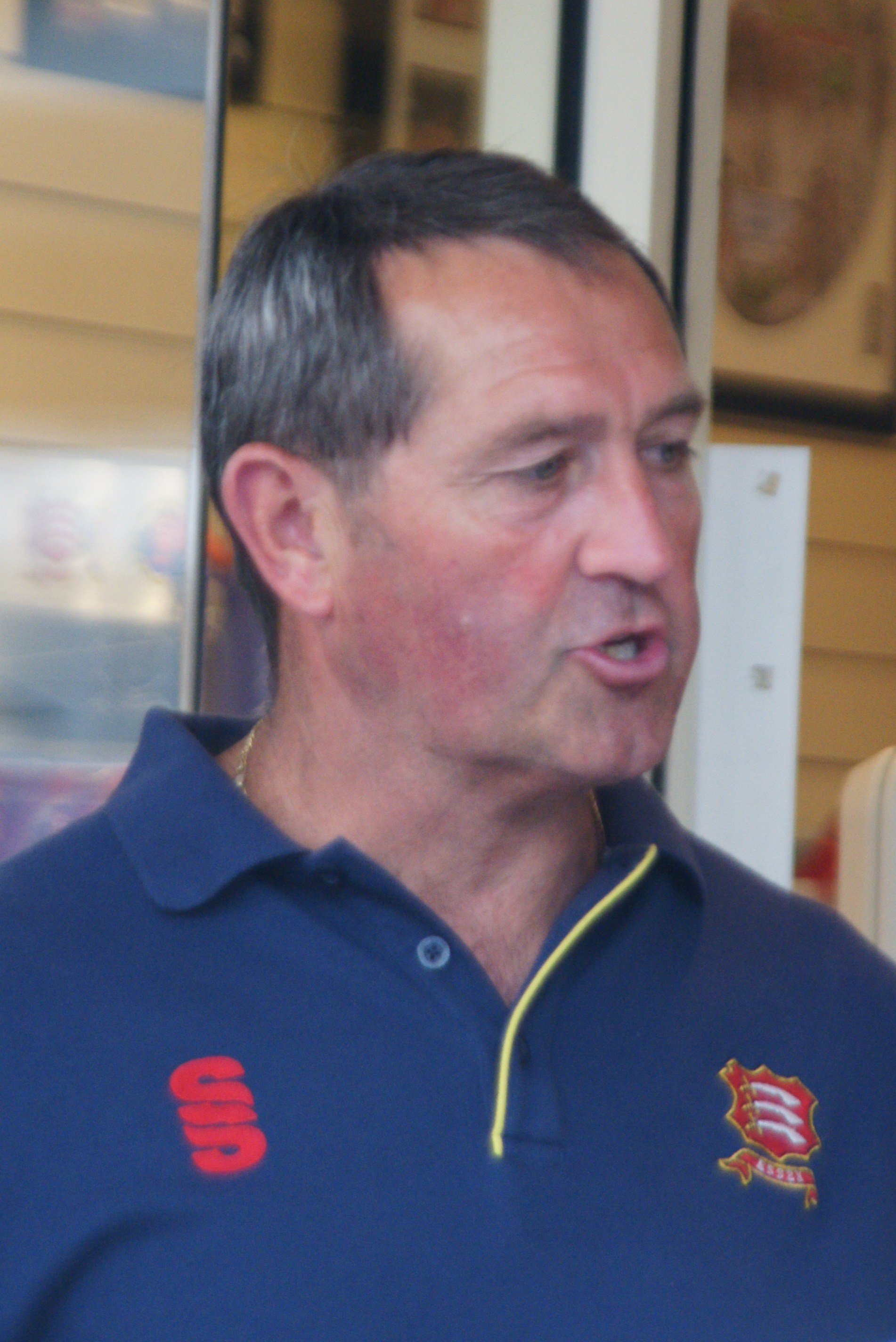
Gooch in 2009

In October 2001, Gooch returned to his beloved Essex in the capacity of head coach, taking over from Keith Fletcher. Gooch held this role until stepping down in March 2005 to Paul Prichard, his long running opening partner. Gooch remains at the club, continuing as the squad's specialist batting coach whilst also assuming commercial duties for the county.

In November 2009 Gooch was selected as a "temporary" batting coach for the impending four test tour of South Africa and to support ex-Essex colleague, Head England Coach Andy Flower.

He has since remained as England's batting coach on a permanent basis, continuing this role for the 2010 series against Bangladesh and Pakistan, and the winter Ashes series against Australia in Australia. Double-centurion Alastair Cook (at the first test at the Gabba in Brisbane) hailed Gooch's influence on England's and his own batting prowess. Gooch subsequently has supervised England's batting (or 'run-scoring', as Ian Bell has noted Gooch refers to it) throughout their rise to number 1 in the Test cricket ICC Rankings. Prior to Gooch taking over, English batsmen had scored 6 test double-centuries in 15 years. 15 months after he became the batting coach, England had already beaten that total.

In March 2012 Gooch took the full-time role as England Batting coach which came in the wake of the disappointing three-match Test series against Pakistan, in which England were beaten 3–0, largely down to the failure of their batsmen. "I am delighted to be taking on the role of England batting coach on a full-time basis," said Gooch, "I will now have the opportunity to spend a lot more time with the players and other coaches both in the build-up to series and during the series themselves."

== Outside cricket ==
He was the subject of This Is Your Life in 1990, when he was surprised by Michael Aspel at a gathering of the England Cricket Team in the Excelsior Hotel at Heathrow Airport.

In the mid-1990s Gooch began promoting hairpieces for a London-based clinic, as well as the Australian-based Advanced Hair Studio. Two licensed computer games were made by Audiogenic, Graham Gooch's Test Cricket in 1985 and Graham Gooch World Class Cricket in 1993.

He made a one-off return to first-class cricket in July 2000, just a few days before his 47th birthday, when he captained Marylebone Cricket Club (MCC) against New Zealand A at The Parks. It was not a successful comeback: Gooch made only 0 and 5 in the game.

In 2007 he announced his intention to compete in a beach cricket competition against Courtney Walsh's Team and Allan Border's team.

In 2011 Gooch received an Honorary Doctorate of Arts from the University of East London.

Graham Gooch is a West Ham United supporter. In 2014, he was appointed patron of The Rob George Foundation.

== England career performance ==
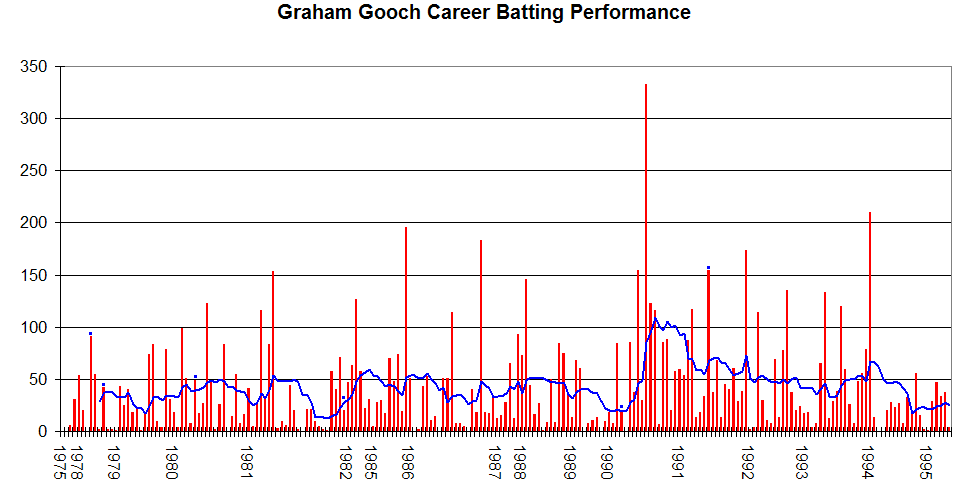
Graham Gooch's Test career performance graph.

Test Match Career Performance by Opposition		Batting			
Opposition	Matches	Runs	Average	High Score	100 / 50
Australia	42	2632	33.31	196	4 / 16
India	19	1725	55.64	333	5 / 8
New Zealand	15	1148	52.18	210	4 / 3
Pakistan	10	683	42.68	135	1 / 5
(Sri Lanka) Sri Lanka	3	376	62.66	174	1 / 1
(Cricket West Indies) West Indies	26	2197	44.83	154*	5 / 13
South Africa	3	139	23.16	33	0 / 0
Overall	118	8900	42.58	333	20 / 46

ODI Career Performance by Opposition		Batting			
Opposition	Matches	Runs	Average	High Score	100 / 50
Australia	32	1395	46.50	136	4 / 9
India	17	420	26.25	115	1 / 1
New Zealand	16	713	50.92	112*	1 / 4
Pakistan	16	517	32.31	142	1 / 1
(Sri Lanka) Sri Lanka	7	303	43.28	84	0 / 4
(Cricket West Indies) West Indies	32	881	30.37	129*	1 / 4
South Africa	1	2	2.00	2	0 / 0
Overall	125	4290	36.98	142	8 / 23

Sporting positions
Preceded by John Emburey; David Gower	English national cricket captain 1988; 1989–1993	Succeeded by David Gower; Mike Atherton
Preceded by Keith Fletcher; Keith Fletcher	Essex cricket captain 1986–1987; 1989–1994	Succeeded by Keith Fletcher; Paul Prichard
