= International cricket in 1991 =

International cricket season

The 1991 International cricket season was from May 1991 to September 1991.

== Season overview ==
International tours
Start date	Home team	Away team	Results [Matches]			
Start date	Home team	Away team	Test	ODI	FC	LA
23 May 1991	England	West Indies	2–2 [5]	3–0 [3]	—	—
22 August 1991	England	Sri Lanka	1–0 [1]	—	—	—

== May ==
=== West Indies in England ===
Texaco Trophy - ODI series
No.	Date	Home captain	Away captain	Venue	Result
ODI 676	23–24 May	Graham Gooch	Vivian Richards	Edgbaston Cricket Ground, Birmingham	England by 1 wicket
ODI 677	25 May	Graham Gooch	Vivian Richards	Old Trafford Cricket Ground, Manchester	England by 9 runs
ODI 678	27 May	Graham Gooch	Vivian Richards	Lord's, London	England by 7 wicket2
Wisden Trophy - Test series
No.	Date	Home captain	Away captain	Venue	Result
Test 1171	6–10 June	Graham Gooch	Vivian Richards	Headingley Cricket Ground, Leeds	England by 115 runs
Test 1172	20–24 June	Graham Gooch	Vivian Richards	Lord's, London	Match drawn
Test 1173	4–9 July	Graham Gooch	Vivian Richards	Trent Bridge, Nottingham	West Indies by 9 wickets
Test 1174	25–28 July	Graham Gooch	Vivian Richards	Edgbaston Cricket Ground, Birmingham	West Indies by 7 wickets
Test 1175	8–12 August	Graham Gooch	Vivian Richards	Kennington Oval, London	England by 5 wickets

== August ==
=== Sri Lanka in England ===
One-off Test series
No.	Date	Home captain	Away captain	Venue	Result
Test 1176	22–27 August	Graham Gooch	Aravinda de Silva	Lord's, London	England by 137 runs
