= Skyles Electric Works =

Company

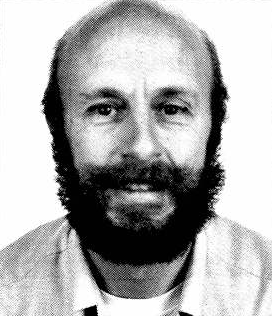
- Bob Skyles in 1980
- Company type: Private
- Industry: Software industry
- Founded: 1978; 47 years ago in Cupertino, California, United States
- Founder: Bob Skyles
- Defunct: 1993
- Fate: Dissolution
- Headquarters: Mountain View, United States
- Products: Software
- Number of employees: 13 (1985–1987)

Skyles Electric Works is a company founded in 1978 in California by Bob Skyles, a former Commodore engineer, to produce hardware add-ons for the Commodore PET. Like Apple Computer, it began in a garage in Cupertino, California, but for most of the company's existence it was based in nearby Mountain View. The company employed 13 between 1985 and 1987 and reached annual sales of over $501,000 in those years.

The first products from Skyles Electric Works were memory expansions and keyboards (the first PETs had calculator-style keys which were unsuited to touch-typing).

The earliest software products were firmware, including the Command-O and Disk-O-Pro, which enhanced the BASIC language of the PET.

The company also published cassette and disk-based software including Busicalc, the first spreadsheet program for the Commodore 64, and which was licensed from Supersoft in England. Busicalc and the follow-up products Busicalc 2 and Busicalc 3 were highly successful in the US market during 1983 and 1984, and encouraged Skyles Electric Works to source other similar products which were rebranded to form part of the Busi series, notably Busidata . Another C64 title was the game Megapede written by Paul Andrus. Among the company's last offerings were memory expansion boards for the 500, 1000, and 2000 models of the Amiga computer.

Skyles Electric Works dissolved in 1993.
