= Supersoft =

British video game developer

- Industry: Software industry, video game industry
- Founded: 1978
- Founders: Peter Calver, Pearl Wellard
- Headquarters: England
- Products: Software, video games

Supersoft is a software and computer game developer and publisher founded in England in 1978. It was founded by Peter Calver and Pearl Wellard to develop and publish software primarily for the Commodore PET.

== History ==
The earliest Supersoft catalogue known to have survived dates from December 1979. Earlier catalogues were photocopied in small quantities.

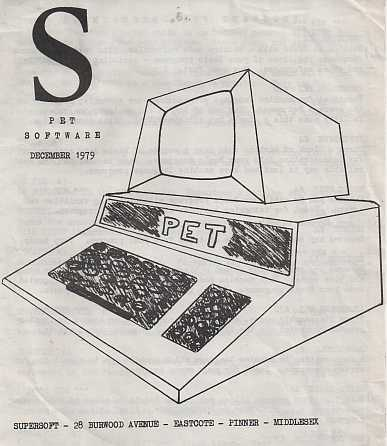
Oldest surviving Supersoft catalogue

=== Hardware ===
In 1980 Supersoft released the first user-installable firmware product to be developed in the UK, the Petmaster Superchip. The following year the company expanded into hardware with the release of a high-resolution graphics card for the Commodore PET - and although by modern standards the resolution of 320 × 200 pixels is not high, it was a considerable improvement on the 80 × 50 capability of the standard model. Originally run from the founders' home in Eastcote, Middlesex the business moved to office premises in Wealdstone in 1981.

=== Software ===
Early games published by Supersoft for the Commodore PET included Air Attack (see Blitz computer game) and Super Glooper, the latter based on the popular Pac-Man arcade game. A text-adventure game based on the Douglas Adams book Hitchhiker's Guide to the Galaxy was withdrawn following legal action. The game's programmer, Bob Chappell, rewrote the game to remove all Hitchhiker's references, and Supersoft republished it as "Cosmic Capers.". The most successful business program developed by Supersoft was Busicalc, a spreadsheet program originally produced for the Commodore PET, and converted to the Vic-20 and Commodore 64; it was one of Supersoft's most successful products in the UK and became the company's first and most successful product in the USA, where it was published under licence by Skyles Electric Works. Busicalc 2 and Busicalc 3 followed, the latter offering three-dimensional capabilities.

=== Forming Audiogenic ===
In 1984 development commenced on a cricket game for the Commodore 64, which was programmed by Michael McLean and released the following year as Graham Gooch's Test Cricket by Audiogenic Software, a newly formed subsidiary of Supersoft. From 1985 onwards Supersoft focused on home office programs and utilities, as the Audiogenic name was better-known in the games business.

=== Microvox ===
In 1987 Supersoft released Microvox, a high-quality digital sampler for the Commodore 64 which, with its accompanying software was developed by Andrew Trott. While only hundreds were sold (the device cost more than the computer), many were used by serious musicians and in professional studios, and one was supplied to Feargal Sharkey, the former lead singer of the Undertones.

=== Present day ===
Although Supersoft is still in existence, the company has not developed any new products for retail sale since 1990. The company is wholly owned by Peter Calver.

== Reception ==
Ahoy! in May 1984 stated that the original Busicalc program was written in Commodore BASIC and was "very sluggish".

The original program had been rushed out to compete with an earlier spreadsheet for the Commodore PET called Simplicalc, which was also written in BASIC. By the time the review was published the program had been largely superseded by Busicalc 2, written in compiled BASIC and machine code, and which was many times faster.

== See also ==
- Audiogenic
- Commodore 64 software
