= International Cricket 2010 =

2010 video game

- Xbox 360 cover, featuring England's Stuart Broad.
- Developer: Trickstar Games
- Publisher: Codemasters
- Series: Codemasters Cricket
- Platforms: PlayStation 3, Xbox 360
- Release: EU: 18 June 2010; AU: 21 October 2010
- Genres: Sports, Cricket
- Modes: Single-player, multiplayer

International Cricket 2010 is a sports association cricket simulation video game developed by Trickstar Games and released by Codemasters. It was released for consoles.It was released in the United Kingdom and India on 18 June 2010 and in Australia on 21 October. The game is a part of the Codemasters Cricket series preceded by the Brian Lara Cricket Series and is a direct sequel to the 2009 release, Ashes Cricket 2009.

The game is licensed by the England Cricket Board and Cricket Australia, and thus includes all the official players of the Australia national cricket team and the England national cricket team (at the time of release). The rest of the teams in the game are unlicensed and don't feature the official players of the corresponding teams.

International Cricket also includes an online mode for the consoles it was released on, and a revolutionary Action Cam which provides an on-field view of play, which allows the user to view the game from different aspects on the field, and works with both batting and bowling.

== Improvements from Ashes Cricket 2009 ==
There is a new tournaments section with four new tournaments based on the big four limited overs contests – World 20 Overs (T20), 20 Overs Super Leagnzue (T20), Champions Cup (ODI) and World Trophy (ODI). Test cricket is still available, and Test tournaments can be participated in by all teams.

There is an expanded roster of 16 international teams (Including Bermuda, Canada, the Netherlands, and Scotland) and players can choose between 21 stadiums from around the world, 3 of which are new additions in Dhaka, Grenada, and Port Elizabeth.

A new Power Stick feature enables players to gain both 360-degree direction and power control.

A new "sportsmanship rating" feature will allow players to decide on a preferred online opponent, especially for avoiding players who quit matches when losing. However, the online aspect of the released game has received extensive criticism due to both the poorly designed sportsmanship ratings feature and a bug which causes online games to disconnect, usually after a boundary or a six is hit by a batsman.

People can select to play in different regions around the world, and even their own tournament. Winning tournaments unlocks brand new kit items, and other awards such as bats, pads and other equipment. The AI has been improved with batsmen being able to pick the gaps, computer simulation, and responses are more realistic than before.

== Consoles and aborted PC version ==
The game was released for PS3 and Xbox 360 and major developer Codemasters said that they wanted to "watch the response of the game with these consoles and decide on the future improvements or other platform releases, should the game do well". The PC version was not released as the Action Cam is not supported by the PC system. Also sales and issues with developer from Ashes Cricket 2009 resulted in a temporary setback regarding the future of games in this line.

== See also ==
- Brian Lara Cricket (series)
- Ashes Cricket 2009
- Cricket 07
- Brian Lara International Cricket 2007
