= Electronic line judge =

Electronic device used in tennis

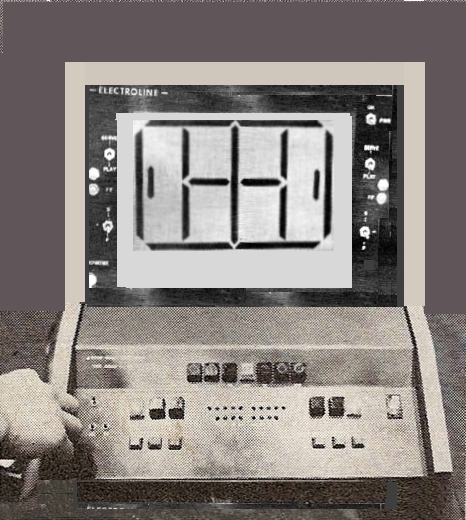
The Electroline; the first computerized, electronic line judge device, introduced in 1974.

An electronic line judge is a device used in tennis to automatically detect where a ball has landed on the court. Attempts to revolutionize tennis officiating and the judging of calls in the sport began in the early 1970s and have resulted in the design, development and prototyping of several computerized, electronic line-judge devices. The methods have been based upon the use of pressure sensors, sensors to detect magnetized or electrically conductive tennis balls, infrared laser beams, and most recently video cameras.

== Development ==
The first successful public demonstration of a computerized device to make automated line calls at a professional tennis tournament was in 1974. This original tennis electronic line judge device, invented by Geoffrey Grant, an avid tennis player, and Robert Nicks, an electronics engineer, was used in the championship finals of both the Men's World Championship Tennis in Dallas in May, 1974 and the Ladies' Virginia Slims tour in Los Angeles. Although the Grant-Nicks pressure sensor based system was given rave reviews in the press at its introduction and was issued with a USPTO patent, the product was never commercialized.

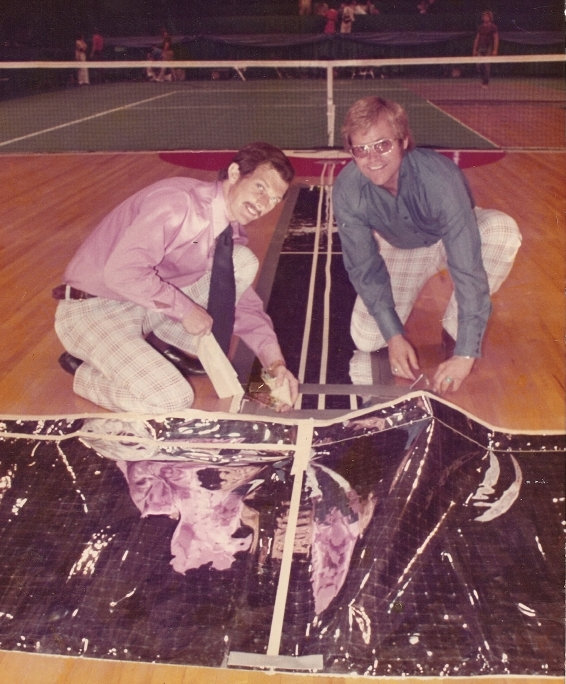
The Mylar sensors used beneath the carpet to detect where the ball landed for the first computerized, electronic line judge device. The inventors; Grant (left) and Nicks. Photo taken in 1976.

This inaugural electronic line-judge device worked on a principle of large, thin mylar conductive plastic pressure sensors beneath the surface of a carpet court. It was able to distinguish between a foot and the tennis ball; the computer detected the sharp, millisecond pulse of the ball bounce striking the ground, as compared to the slowness and electronic print of player's foot movements. Even when a foot was present on the sensor a dynamic load circuit was able to detect and distinguish between the signals. Beneath the court surface on each boundary line of the court were both and "in" and "out" sensors so that if a ball hit the outside of the line and also hit the "out" sensor the computer would correctly overrule the "out" call allowing play to continue.

This first electronic device made decisions not only as to whether the ball landed within the boundaries of the playing zones, but also was wired to make foot fault and service net-cord legal serve decisions. The foot fault judge used directional microphones to detect the striking of the ball by the player's racquet, when serving the ball, that functioned in conjunction with a timing circuit to detect if the players foot had activated the baseline line "IN" sensor immediately prior to, or during, the striking of the ball. The net cord "Let" sensor was a simple piezoelectric device, initially a guitar pickup, to detect if the tennis ball touched the net during the service delivery. The service line sensors, net-cord sensor, legal serve and foot fault devices were turned "on" in unison during the process of a player serving the ball at the beginning of each point and then turned "off" as the opponent returned the ball.

In its successful inaugural use, at the Men's World Championships of Tennis 1974 finals in the Southern Methodist University indoor stadium in Dallas, Texas, the device was limited to judging only the service line. A later prototype was used to call all tennis court lines plus the net-cord as at the Ladies Virginia Slims championships in Los Angeles during 1975.

The second system that was publicly demonstrated to electronically officiate line calls was introduced in Edinburgh, Scotland, UK at the Pernod sponsored tennis event in July 1977. The system was invented by Lyle David, who patented electrically conductive tennis balls, a micro-computer network systems equipment and installed wires at the boundaries of the court to detect and determine the location of the contact of the ball with the surface.

The system had some failings with respect to reliability and, like the Grant-Nicks pressure sensor device, did not emerge as a commercial product.

=== Cyclops ===
Commercially, the most successful system to emerge in the early experimental period of electronic officiating was the "Cyclops". Cyclops was a device used only for service line calls but functioned reliably and was used around the world for many years until superseded by video and television technology. The Cyclops system consisted of a series of infrared laser light beams projected, at a centimeter above the ground, to a receiver device across the court and then to a computer. The series of beams were aligned to accurately determine if the ball was inside the service area. This determination was only valid with respect to the main service line and not the side or center service lines. The Cyclops system was used only on show courts and covered only the main service lines.

=== Hawk-Eye ===
In the 2000s, the sport began to embrace video camera methodology such as Hawk-Eye.

Hawk-Eye allows review of player-questioned line calls on a select few "high" visibility televised matches. This limited use has been criticized as a social discontinuity in that players of lesser stature who are not asked to play on show courts are being unfairly discriminated against.

The professional tennis players associations, both the Association of Tennis Professionals and the Women's Tennis Association standardized a challenge process, whereby players could use Hawk-Eye information to challenge potentially incorrect calls.

=== Hawk-Eye Live ===
In 2017, the Next Generation ATP Finals used Hawk-Eye Live, which meant that no line judges would be on the courts, and that all calls would be made automatically by the Hawk Eye technology in real time. Instead of line umpires, the system detects the relevant movements of the player and where the ball bounces on court. A pre-recorded voice announces "Out", "Fault", and "Foot fault".

To reduce staff due to COVID-19 pandemic restrictions, the 2020 US Open employed electronic line judges on most matches, excluding those held at Arthur Ashe Stadium and Louis Armstrong Stadium. This was also done in the 2020 ATP Finals. At the 2021 Australian Open, all matches used electronic line judges for the first time in a Grand Slam event. Hawk-Eye Live was subsequently made permanent at the 2022 US Open, and in April 2023 the ATP announced that all ATP Tour events would switch to electronic line judging by 2025. In October 2024, the All England Club announced that Wimbledon would also switch permanently to electronic line judging beginning in 2025, leaving the French Open as the only Grand Slam to still use line judges.
