= Cyclops (computer system) =

Electronic line judge system in tennis

Cyclops is a computer system co-invented by Bill Carlton of Great Britain and Margaret Parnis England of Malta, which is used on the ATP and WTA professional tennis tours as an electronic line judge to help determine whether a serve is in or out.

The system, which must be activated by the service line umpire before each serve, projects five or six infra-red horizontal beams of light along the court 10 mm above the ground. One beam covers the good (short) side of the service line and others cover the fault (long) side. If a served ball hits the first beam, the other beams are turned off, while a long serve will break one of the other beams. A long serve is indicated by an audible signal. Obvious long serves that go beyond Cyclops' beams are called by the service line umpire. The system is tuned before and during each tournament by a representative of the company which rents the system. This representative stays through the tournament and confers with tournament officials afterwards to determine any problems which may have arisen. The system has been constantly refined to improve accuracy, although no statistics on its efficacy are available.

The Cyclops computer system was introduced to the Wimbledon Championships in 1980 and the U.S. Open in 1981, and was also used at the Australian Open. With the advent of the more comprehensive Hawk-eye system in the early 2000s, Cyclops began to be superseded at major tournaments. Cyclops was replaced by Hawk-Eye at the US Open from 2006, and at the Australian Open and Wimbledon from 2007. Cyclops is not currently used in any capacity at any of the tennis Grand Slam events.

== See also ==
- Electronic line judge
- Hawk-Eye
