= Ashes Cricket 2009 =

2009 video game

- Cover art of European version
- Developers: Transmission Games (PS3 and Xbox 360), Gusto Games (Wii)
- Publishers: Codemasters (UK), Namco Bandai Partners (AUS)
- Platforms: PlayStation 3, Wii, Microsoft Windows, Xbox 360
- Release: PlayStation 3: AU: 6 August 2009; EU: 7 August 2009; Wii: EU: 7 August 2009; AU: 5 November 2009; Microsoft Windows: EU: 7 August 2009; AU: 13 August 2009; NA: 19 August 2009; Xbox 360: EU: 7 August 2009; AU: 13 August 2009
- Genres: Sports, Cricket
- Modes: Single-player, multiplayer

Ashes Cricket 2009 is a cricket video game developed by Transmission Games and published by Codemasters in the UK and by Namco Bandai in Australia. It has been released for the PlayStation 3, Xbox 360 and Microsoft Windows. A Wii version, developed by Gusto Games, has also been released. The Wii version was released simply as Cricket in Australia. A sequel, International Cricket 2010 was released on 18 June 2010.

The game is licensed by the ECB (England and Wales Cricket Board), Cricket Australia and the Marylebone Cricket Club (MCC), owners of the Ashes Urn. It includes all the official players of the Australian cricket team and the England cricket team, however the other teams are not licensed.

== Overview ==
According to the game, the game includes an intuitive, interactive bowling control scheme and dynamic and intuitive batting, with greater coverage and shot choice than previous games. The game also features official Hawk-Eye visualisations during play.

The game features two player co-op play, with up to four player versus matches. The PC, PS3 and Xbox 360 versions also feature full online multiplayer. The PC, PS3 and Xbox 360 versions also feature a coaching mode where they can learn the disciplines of batting, bowling and fielding from Sir Ian Botham and Shane Warne.

The game features commentary by Tony Greig, Jonathan Agnew, Shane Warne, Ian Bishop and Sir Ian Botham.

== Release ==
=== Demo ===
The demo consists of a 6 over (3 overs per side) Ashes Test match at Lord's where the player is able to choose whether to bat or field. The demo was released for the Xbox 360 on 24 July and for the PC on 30 July, but there was no demo released for PlayStation 3.

=== Post-release support ===
Following the game's release, Codemasters and Transmission Games began work on an update addressing gameplay and balancing issues. In a September 2009 Q&A, producer Jamie Firth confirmed that a patch was in development following feedback from players. Reported areas being addressed included the frequency of run-outs, high scoring rates, edged deliveries failing to carry to fielders and inaccurate bowling speeds.

Version 1.1 Open Beta 1 was released for Windows on 21 September 2009. The beta concentrated on changes to the single-player game, with online play temporarily disabled while further work was carried out. Transmission and Codemasters asked players to provide feedback on match pacing, difficulty and gameplay balance. A second open beta was released on 28 September. It required the first beta to be installed and reintroduced online functionality using a development server while testing continued.

Transmission Games subsequently closed in October 2009, with its remaining employees made redundant and the company entering voluntary liquidation. The beta updates were not followed by a completed PC patch, and planned updates for the PlayStation 3 and Xbox 360 versions were not released.

Reception

Aggregate scores
Aggregator	Score
GameRankings	64.33%
Metacritic	66/100

Review score
Publication	Score
IGN	7.4/10

== Reception ==
Ashes Cricket 2009 received mixed to positive reviews, with critics generally praising its batting and bowling systems and its representation of the sport, while criticism focused on artificial intelligence, fielding, visual presentation and technical issues. Metacritic lists a score of 66 out of 100 based on four critic reviews.

Steve Boxer of The Guardian described the game as a "classy and thoroughly playable effort" and considered it an improvement on earlier cricket games in balancing batting and bowling. He praised the bowling controls, shot-selection system and catching mechanic, as well as the ability of individual players to reproduce characteristics of their real-life counterparts. Boxer considered the high-definition console versions the most impressive visually, although he criticised the player likenesses.

Steven Williamson of HEXUS awarded the Xbox 360 and PlayStation 3 versions 8 out of 10. He praised the batting and bowling mechanics, tactical artificial intelligence, tutorials and presentation, describing the game as accessible while retaining considerable depth. He was less positive about the fielding system, particularly its timing-based catching mechanic, and criticised the difficulty balancing, crowd graphics and limited player customisation.

GameSpot's Dan Chiappini awarded the console versions 6.5 out of 10. He praised the accessible yet nuanced gameplay and competitive multiplayer, but found the computer-controlled opposition inconsistently difficult and criticised numerous fielding bugs and glitches. Chiappini also noted inaccurate player likenesses, uneven animations and occasional performance problems, concluding that cricket enthusiasts were likely to derive the most enjoyment from the game despite its technical shortcomings.

GameSpot awarded the Windows version 6 out of 10, similarly praising its accessible controls and variety of match types while criticising inconsistent artificial intelligence and technical problems. The review additionally criticised the removal of the local multiplayer modes found in the console versions.

The Wii version received a more mixed response. Nintendo Life awarded it 6 out of 10, finding its multiplayer enjoyable but criticising the motion controls, single-player experience and jerky presentation. GameSpot was more negative, awarding the Wii release 4.5 out of 10 and criticising its inaccurate motion controls, inconsistent artificial intelligence, passive fielding and presentation, although it noted that the motion controls broadly imitated the physical actions of batting and bowling.

== Commercial performance ==
Ashes Cricket 2009 debuted at number one on the United Kingdom's GfK Chart-Track all-formats software chart following its release in August 2009, displacing Wii Sports Resort. It was Codemasters' first all-formats number-one title since Brian Lara International Cricket 2005 four years earlier and made Codemasters the first British publisher to top the chart since Eidos Interactive with Battlestations: Midway in 2007.

The game's launch-week sales were almost three times those achieved by Brian Lara International Cricket 2005 during its corresponding debut week. MCV reported that this made Ashes Cricket 2009 the biggest launch for a cricket video game in UK chart history at the time. The PlayStation 3, Xbox 360 and Wii versions respectively occupied second, third and fourth place on the individual-format sales chart during the same week.

Ashes Cricket 2009 retained the number-one position on the UK all-formats chart for a second consecutive week. By the week ending 29 August, it remained within the top three, behind newly released Batman: Arkham Asylum and Wii Sports Resort.

== Legacy ==
Ashes Cricket 2009 was the final sports game developed by Transmission Games. In October 2009, approximately two months after the game's release, the Melbourne-based developer entered voluntary liquidation and closed, with its remaining employees being made redundant.

Development work initially intended for a patch to Ashes Cricket 2009 subsequently developed into a larger project. According to GameSpot, Transmission Games had concluded before its closure that the proposed alterations were too extensive to incorporate into a patch. Following the studio's collapse, members of the development team formed Trickstar Games and continued working with the codebase from Ashes Cricket 2009.

The resulting game, International Cricket 2010, was announced by Codemasters in March 2010 as the successor to Ashes Cricket 2009. It retained members of the previous game's development team while introducing changes including 360-degree batting control and a new player-level camera system. Codemasters described Ashes Cricket 2009 at the time as a "Number One best seller".
