= Brian Lara Cricket (1998 video game) =

PlayStation and PC game

- Developer: Codemasters
- Publisher: Codemasters
- Series: Brian Lara Cricket
- Platforms: PlayStation, Microsoft Windows
- Release: PlayStation: AU: December 8, 1998; EU: December 8, 1998; Microsoft Windows: EU: 1999; AU: 1999
- Genre: Sports
- Modes: Single player, multiplayer

Brian Lara Cricket, released as Shane Warne Cricket '99 in Australia and New Zealand, is a 1998 PlayStation and PC cricket game, endorsed by West Indian cricketer Brian Lara, produced by Codemasters, and the sequel to Brian Lara Cricket '96.

== Gameplay ==
Screenshot from Brian Lara Cricket '99

Games can be against another player or against the computer. The game has a variety of game modes, of which include:

- Quick match - a quick friendly one-dayer where all options are set up by the computer.
- Friendly - a quick friendly one-dayer that can be played by any two of the nine test playing nations, with all the options player chosen.
- World Cup - the Cricket World Cup tournament, where players go through a series of stages in order to win the cup.
- World Series - this mode allows a tournament of up to five teams, including Australia, who are always the host nation. After a series of matches, the team with the most victories wins the tournament.
- Knockout tournament - the knockout tournament involves eight teams, and, like other modes in the game, the tournament progresses through a series of knockout stages until a winner is declared.
- Test series - this mode allows a one-to-six game Test series between any two teams.
- Test season - in this mode, the player controls a team for one to seven years of Test cricket. The leaders are recorded on a leader's board.
- Classic Match - a series of classic matches throughout history, where the player must complete one to compete in the next match. As the series of matches goes on, difficulty increases.

Practice in the nets is also accessible, with the player being able to alternate bowlers and batsmen during practice.

Commentary for the games is provided by commentator Geoffrey Boycott and cricket broadcaster Jonathan Agnew.

=== Teams ===
Players can choose from the nine Test playing cricket nations at the time: Australia, England, India, New Zealand, Pakistan, South Africa, Sri Lanka, West Indies and Zimbabwe. Six Associate teams are also playable but only in World Cup mode. The Associate teams have a squad of 11 players, as opposed to 22 from the Test nations.

Available from the main menu are a list of all the Test nation's players and their real life statistics including bowling and batting averages. The game can also archive the progress of up to 20 players and record the various records for both formats of the game.

== Legacy ==
The game has subsequently been regarded as an important entry in the development of cricket video games. In a 2013 retrospective for The Guardian, Scott Murray described Brian Lara Cricket as an "equally radical leap forward into sophisticated 3D gameplay" from the earlier games in the series, highlighting its transition to three-dimensional graphics and commentary by Geoffrey Boycott and Jonathan Agnew. Murray included the Brian Lara Cricket series among what he described as a "golden era" for cricket video games.
