= Loopz =

1990 video game

- Cover art
- Developer: Audiogenic
- Publisher: Mindscape
- Designer: Ian Upton
- Composer: David Whittaker
- Platforms: Atari ST, Acorn Archimedes, Acorn Electron, Amiga, Amstrad CPC, BBC Micro, Commodore 64, MS-DOS, Game Boy, Atari Lynx, NES, NEC PC-9800, ZX Spectrum, X68000
- Release: 1990
- Genre: Puzzle
- Mode: Single-player

Loopz is a 1990 puzzle video game developed by Audiogenic and published by Mindscape for the Atari ST. It was designed and programmed by Ian Upton.

The Nintendo Entertainment System version (programmed by Bits Studios) and the Game Boy version (programmed by Argonaut Software) were released in 1990. Audiogenic published versions of the original game for the Acorn Archimedes, Acorn Electron, BBC Micro, ZX Spectrum, Amstrad CPC, Commodore 64, Atari ST, Amiga, and IBM PC in 1990 and 1991.

== Gameplay ==
The main focus is on the playing board where random pieces of different shapes are presented to the player. A shape is either a single square containing a straight line or 90° corner or a combination of multiple such squares. The player must then try to make loops out of them. Once a loop is completed, all pieces involved will disappear. (You cannot make any line overlapping the edge, in other words, it cannot be placed in this way)

There exist three different play modes, two of which can be played with two players. The third mode of play starts with a loop already created and then takes away random pieces of it, so the player has to put them back in after they show up.

== Reception ==
Reception

Review scores
Publication	Score
ACE	ST: 795/1000
Aktueller Software Markt	10/12 ST: 11/12
Computer and Video Games	79%
Raze	AMI & PC: 94%
Video Games (DE)	69%
VideoGames & Computer Entertainment	SNES: 8/10
Your Sinclair	77%

Richard Leadbetter of Computer and Video Games gave the game 79% for its Amiga version describing its gameplay as simplistic but decent, while noted that graphics looked dated. The Atari ST version received the same score. Steve Cooke of ACE magazine rated the Atari ST version 795/1000 noting its difficulty and longer learning curve compared to its peers. Stephan Englhart of Video Games gave the game's Game Boy version 69% and noted that it didn't stand out among its peers. Martin Gaksch gave the NES version 69% as well calling the idea innovative, but not well executed.

== Legacy ==
A port was done for the Atari Lynx, also for Audiogenic by Hand Made Software but lay unreleased until picked up by Songbird Productions in 2004.

An agreement was reached between Audiogenic Software and the defunct Atari Classics Programmer's Club in 1995 for creating a version of the game for Atari 8-bit computers. Development was abandoned in October 1998.

A sequel, Super Loopz, was published for the Super NES by Imagineer and for the Amiga CD32 by Audiogenic.

Audiogenic licensed the Loopz concept to Capcom who developed a prototype coin-op, but it was never released. Similarly Audiogenic developed an SWP (skill-with-prizes) version on behalf of Barcrest, a leading UK manufacturer of pub games, and this too remains unreleased.
