= Paul Hawkins (mathematician) =

British entrepreneur, technologist, and former cricketer

- Born: April 26, 1974 (age 52); United Kingdom
- Education: Durham University
- Occupations: Entrepreneur, technologist, former cricketer
- Known for: Co-inventor of Hawk-Eye

Paul Hawkins (born 26 April 1974) is an English mathematician, entrepreneur, technologist, and former cricketer, best known as the co-inventor of Hawk-Eye, a computer vision system used in sports officiating. Originally developed for cricket, the technology has since been adopted in tennis, football, and numerous other sports worldwide.

== Early life and education ==
Hawkins was born in the United Kingdom and attended Durham University, where he studied Computer Science to doctoral level, and represented the university cricket team.

== Cricket career ==
A right-handed batsman and right-arm medium bowler, Hawkins played first-class cricket for the Durham University Centre of Cricketing Excellence (UCCE) in the early 2000s. While not pursuing a professional cricket career, his playing experience contributed to his deep understanding of ball-tracking technology.

== Hawk-Eye ==
Hawkins co-invented Hawk-Eye in 2001 while working with engineers at Roke Manor Research. Initially intended to enhance television broadcasts of cricket matches, the system quickly gained a reputation for accuracy in tracking the trajectory of a ball. It was soon adopted by sports governing bodies for decision review systems (DRS) in cricket, line-calling in tennis, and goal-line technology in football.

In 2006, Hawk-Eye Innovations was acquired by Wisden Group, and later by Sony Corporation in 2011.

== Other ventures ==
Hawkins has continued to work on sports technology, including automated officiating systems, data analytics, and virtual reality training tools for athletes.

== Personal life ==
Hawkins remains active in sports development projects and has been involved in initiatives aimed at improving fairness and accuracy in sports officiating.
