= Emlyn Hughes International Soccer =

1988 video game

- Amstrad cover art
- Publisher: Audiogenic Software Ltd.
- Composer: David Whittaker (Amiga)
- Platforms: Amiga, Amstrad CPC, Atari ST, Commodore 64, ZX Spectrum
- Release: 1988 (C64); 1989 (Amstrad CPC/ZX Spectrum); 1990 (Amiga/Atari ST)
- Genre: Sports
- Modes: Single-player, multiplayer

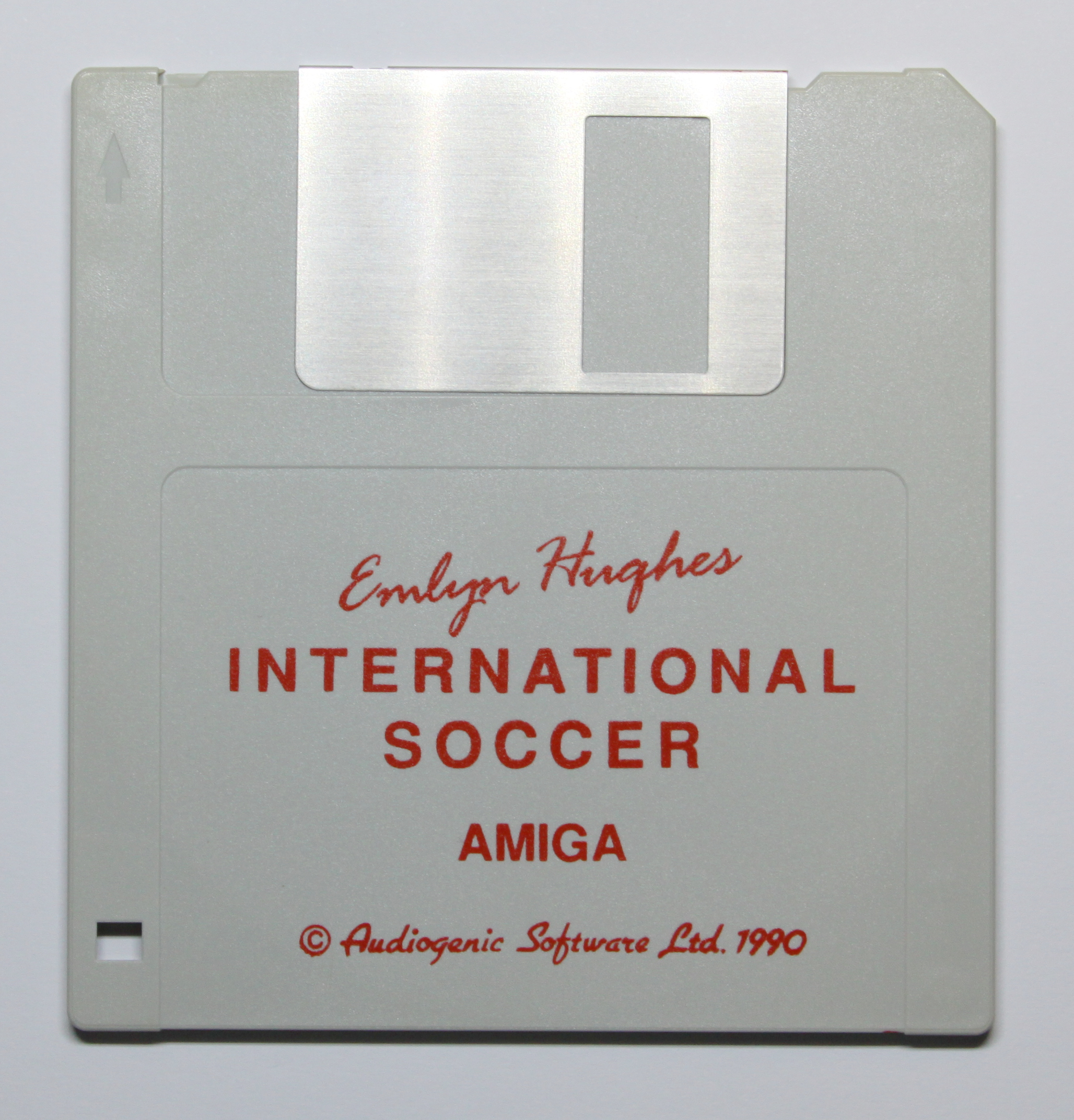
Amiga floppy disk

Emlyn Hughes International Soccer (EHIS) is a soccer computer game first released in 1988 by Audiogenic Software Ltd. The game is named after the popular English footballer Emlyn Hughes. It initially appeared on the Commodore 64, with other versions produced for the Amstrad CPC, ZX Spectrum, Atari ST and Amiga.

The game was programmed by Graham Blighe with additional coding by Michael McLean. Gameplay included arcade-style action and the management aspect of the sport. Critical response to the game was generally positive with accolades and high ratings from the industry magazines.

== History ==
EHIS debuted on Commodore 64, but versions were also developed for Amstrad, ZX Spectrum, Atari ST and Amiga as part of Audiogenic's general cross-platform strategy. Upon its release it was hailed by some as the most realistic football simulation ever made, and gathered enthusiastic reviews, in particular from ZZAP!64. The program was in the UK computer games charts for over three years following its release, and was still enjoying a small but enthusiastic cult following almost 20 years after its release.

Every version of the game was programmed by Graham Blighe and produced by Peter Calver, with graphics created by Andrew Calver, and playtesting by Jeremy Wellard (who later founded HB Studios); the strategy section was coded by Michael McLean (in later versions Terry Wiley). The music for the Commodore 64 version was written by Barry Leitch.

The inspiration for the game came from International Soccer, a highly successful cartridge game for the Commodore 64 that had been released by Commodore themselves in the early 1980s. Indeed, EHIS offered an optional mode in which the controls were deliberately limited, to simulate the restricted options available in the earlier game. This both provided an easy introduction and helped to emphasise the extent to which the controls had been enhanced.

At the time of its release EHIS faced heavy competition from titles such as Match Day II (1987), Kick Off (1989) and MicroProse Soccer, but what made EHIS different from the other games of its time was the fine balance between playability and simulation - it was not as slow as Match Day II, nor as reflex-driven as Kick Off and Sensible Soccer. As a result, the appeal of EHIS was strongest among those who preferred skillful, tactical football to frantic arcade action. Despite limited graphics, and a side view of the action (whereas Kick Off had recently introduced the bird's-eye perspective), EHIS held its own because of a powerful control system that gave the players unprecedented control over the game.

== Gameplay ==
EHIS gameplay included the basic running, kicking, shooting style but also had advanced technique gameplay which added depth and realism to the game. For example, turning naturally involved changing direction of the joystick, but instead of coming to a halt straight away, the player would slow down, stop and start to run in the direction of the joystick.

EHIS advanced techniques included the '5-direction' option. This meant that the players could pass and shoot up to 5 different directions from where the player was facing. This was achieved by holding the fire button and pushing the joystick at an angle from where your player is running and releasing the button. Other techniques include sidestepping, barging, heading, back heels, lobs, diving headers, sliding tackles and many other miscellaneous features.

This was the first time that management features had been included in an arcade-style soccer game, and the identities of the players were reinforced with a rudimentary on-screen commentary, another ground-breaking feature. The game was also highly configurable with everything from the players' stats and names to the pitch and shirt colours.

The management aspect included picking the player's squad (based on player skills and fitness levels). Amongst the many options the players can compete in competitions including cup, championship and leagues. EHIS was one of the first football games to include a full season of gameplay. The players would compete in a league competition (home and away) and take part in a knock-out style cup competition. Throughout the season the player's fitness and morale would fluctuate and they could even get injured.

== Reception ==
Reception

Award
Publication	Award
Amstrad Action	Mastergame

Zzap!64 awarded the game with a 90% rating, gaining a Zzap! 'Sizzler' accolade. Commodore User gave an 84% rating explaining that "this isn't quite Microprose Soccer but it's still a vast improvement on many of the football games available".

Sinclair User gave the game a 91 rating and a Sinclair User 'Classic' accolade. CRASH however gave the game a lukewarm reception and a score of 70%, commenting that "playing matches is fun (especially with two players), although play is not quite up to the standard set by Match Day II". Your Sinclair gave a 5/10 rating stating that the game was "well implemented (control systems aside) but ultimately derivative football game combining action and strategy to little effect". The Games Machine reviewed both the Commodore 64 and Spectrum versions in the April 1989 issue. The C64 version received an 88% rating while the Spectrum version garnered a respectable 85%.

Amstrad Action reviewed the game alongside other football games—MicroProse Soccer, Streetgang Football and Gary Lineker's Hot Shot—in the football special issue of June 1989. Emlyn came on top with a 93% and the AA 'Mastergame' accolade.

The Commodore 64 version was rated as the 44th best game of all time in a special issue of Commodore Format magazine in November 1994.

== Legacy ==
There are other videogames and projects related to this title:

- Emlyn Hughes Arcade Quiz
- EHIS2 project (defunct)

Audiogenic subsequently developed two other arcade soccer games, European Champions (released by Ocean Software) and Wembley International Soccer, both of which extended the degree of control, though neither sold in great numbers. They, however, did introduce another innovative feature - the option to switch between side-on and top-down views, which made replays particularly interesting. Graham Blighe also wrote the arcade section of these games, with the exception of the IBM PC version of European Champions.

The Amiga version of Super League Manager, also developed by Audiogenic, came with a feature that allowed players to watch (or play, if their team was involved) a random game of the week providing they had a copy of EHIS.
