= Brian Lara Cricket '96 =

1996 video game

- Developer(s): Audiogenic
- Publisher(s): Codemasters
- Series: Brian Lara Cricket
- Platform(s): Sega Mega Drive; Amiga
- Release: UK: 17 May 1996; AU: 24 June 1996
- Genre(s): Sports
- Mode(s): Single-player, multiplayer

Brian Lara Cricket '96, known as Lara '96 and Shane Warne Cricket in Australia and New Zealand, is the sequel to Brian Lara Cricket and the second game in the Brian Lara-endorsed series of cricket video games. It was developed by Audiogenic for Codemasters and released in 1996 for the Sega Mega Drive, Amiga and PC systems.

== Gameplay ==
The style and method of game play is almost identical to previous versions of the game. Lara '96 featured the updated player names and statistics of the 1997 cricket season. Notable additional features include the capability to play as English county sides as well as a player editor.

Due to “technical restrictions” the Amiga version of the game depicted all players as white, including Brian Lara himself.

== Development ==
Lara '96 uses the same pseudo-3D graphics used in its predecessor, but the animations and sprites were updated. This game uses a serial EEPROM (24C65 type) for backup.
