= Brian Lara International Cricket 2005 =

2005 video game

- Developer: Swordfish Studios
- Publisher: Codemasters
- Series: Brian Lara Cricket
- Platforms: Microsoft Windows, PlayStation 2, Xbox
- Release: EU: 21 July 2005; AU: 29 September 2005
- Genre: Sports
- Modes: Single player, multiplayer

Brian Lara International Cricket 2005, known as Ricky Ponting Cricket in Australia and New Zealand, is a cricket video game from Codemasters, available on Xbox, PlayStation 2 and Windows platforms, released on 21 July 2005, which was the first day of the 2005 Ashes series. The game is followed by Brian Lara International Cricket 2007 (Ricky Ponting International Cricket 2007 in Australia and New Zealand and Yuvraj Singh International Cricket in India).

== Details ==
This game is the follow-up to Brian Lara Cricket '99 (also known as Shane Warne Cricket '99 in Australia and New Zealand). It contains the 2003 Cricket World Cup in Africa and the 2004 ICC Champions Trophy. These two competitions are licensed by the International Cricket Council (ICC) and contain official player names, faces, kits, badges and sponsors. All other modes are unofficial as the rights for these belong to EA Sports and therefore some players and kits are made up; for example Graham Thorpe becomes "G Thrip" and Shane Warne becomes "S Worde". The only correct names in these modes are Brian Lara himself, (shown as "B Lara"), and Australian Captain Ricky Ponting (similarly shown as R Ponting). The game is also first to include licensed bats such as the Kookaburra Diablo and the GM Purist. The game takes the perspective of the normal cricket TV coverage, other views and displays in the game also try to emulate TV coverage of cricket, for example Hawk-Eye, an electronic system used to track cricket balls as they are bowled is featured in the game.

The Hawk-Eye system used in the game

== Game modes ==
There are a few types of cricket that can be played in the game. Test match, Test series, One Day match, World Cup, ICC Champion's Trophy and practice mode. Along with the types of cricket there are several difficulty settings. Slog mode, village, county and test. With each difficulty bowling and batting decreases in ease. The game also offers the player to construct their own team from cricketers already in the game, and to construct their own "Career Players" who gain experience with each match. There is also a "Classic XI" mode, which has famous cricketers of the past such as W.G. Grace, Imran Khan and Jim Laker.

=== Challenges ===
There are also a challenge mode in the game, where the player can take on cricketing challenges based on notable cricket matches from the past. The player can either recreate or rewrite history, depending on the team they choose to play as. These include such matches as The birth of The Ashes, the 1933 Bodyline test match, Garfield Sobers' six sixes, and the 2003 ICC Cricket World Cup final. There are 10 challenges in total.

== Reception ==
Brian Lara International Cricket 2005 received positive reviews, with critics particularly praising its accessible control system and its treatment of batting and bowling.

James Orry of VideoGamer awarded the game 8 out of 10. He praised the timing-based batting system, bowling mechanics, range of game modes and television-style presentation, particularly the implementation of Hawk-Eye. Orry considered the game accessible on its lower difficulty settings while providing a considerably more demanding cricket simulation on the higher settings. He criticised the difficulty of batting for inexperienced players and aspects of the fielding system, including the inability to return the ball to the bowler's end.

Neil Pickup of Cricket Web awarded the game 88%. He praised the greater control offered while bowling compared with earlier cricket games, including the ability to vary pace, swing and seam movement. Pickup also praised the timing-based batting and fielding systems, considering them easy to learn but difficult to master. He nevertheless criticised aspects of the artificial intelligence and bowling-speed mechanics.

Nick Haywood of HEXUS similarly preferred Brian Lara International Cricket 2005 to EA Sports' competing Cricket 2005. He praised the game's accessible controls, confidence system and artificial intelligence's ability to react to repetitive bowling tactics, while criticising occasional animation problems, a lack of graphical polish and the restriction that fielders could only return the ball to the wicket-keeper's end.

Reviewers also noted the game's restricted licensing. Official player names, kits and likenesses were available in its licensed ICC competitions, while players in other modes appeared under altered names.

== Commercial performance ==
Brian Lara International Cricket 2005 was commercially successful in the United Kingdom, benefiting from its release during the 2005 Ashes series. It entered the UK all-formats software chart at number two during the week ending 23 July 2005. The following week it rose to number one, displacing Madagascar. Game Developer noted that it marked the first time the Brian Lara Cricket series had returned to the top of the UK chart since its success during the 16-bit era.

In September 2005, The Independent reported that the game's initial stock of 100,000 copies had sold out within two weeks of release and that it had spent a total of four weeks at number one on the UK chart. The newspaper identified the game as one of several products to benefit from the surge in British interest in cricket during the 2005 Ashes.

== Legacy ==
Brian Lara International Cricket 2005 subsequently developed a reputation as a notable cricket video game. Reviewing its successor, Brian Lara International Cricket 2007, VideoGamer described the 2005 game as an addictive and highly enjoyable return for the series and considered it the best cricket game available at the time. The publication ultimately preferred the 2005 game to its sequel, arguing that its artificial intelligence allowed players to contest longer matches which more closely resembled real-life cricket.

In a 2019 retrospective, cricket magazine The Cricketer described Brian Lara International Cricket 2005 as a classic with a lasting cult reputation. Writer Thomas Blow praised its commentary, range of game modes and presentation, and highlighted the altered names used for unlicensed players as an unintended source of humour that contributed to the game's cult status. Blow argued that the game possessed a distinctive character and appeal that many later cricket games had failed to reproduce.
