= Audiogenic =

British video game developer

- Industry: Video games
- Founded: 1975 (Audiogenic Ltd.), 1985 (Audiogenic Software Ltd.)
- Founder: Peter Calver
- Headquarters: United Kingdom

Audiogenic was the name of two related UK-based businesses involved in video game publishing and development from the late 1970s until 1997. The original business started out as a recording studio and cassette duplication service which moved into video game publishing from the late 1970s onwards.

Following its demise, a new company, also trading as Audiogenic, was formed in 1985 to acquire its assets. It published its last new title in 1997, after the core of the development team was taken over by Codemasters to create Brian Lara Cricket on the PlayStation. The company is still in existence and continues to license its portfolio of titles to third parties for conversion onto new formats.

Though almost unknown in the United States, the company was successful in the United Kingdom and in Australia with a line of cricket and rugby games, some versions of which were licensed to other publishers. Several games were also published under licence in Japan, including World Class Rugby for the Super NES, and a follow-up, World Class Rugby 2, both of which were published by Imagineer.

== First company ==
The original company, Audiogenic Limited, was started as a recording studio called Sun in Reading, Berkshire in 1975 by Martin Maynard. It was one of the first 8 track studios to operate outside London. By comparison with modern studios the recording equipment was very basic; however, it still recorded for bands including The Vibrators, XTC, Stadium Dogs, Van Morrison, Alan Clayson and The New Seekers. It offered an audio cassette duplication service and the company also made arrangements for pressing vinyl. Terry Clark recently performed (February 2008 JonesFest) a song about the studio at a tribute concert for Garry Jones at the South Street centre in Reading.

Around 1979 Audiogenic became interested in the Commodore PET computer and gained a contract to duplicate computer software on cassette. Subsequently Commodore International gave Audiogenic the software manufacturing and selling rights, but this arrangement came to an end with the advent of the VIC-20. Martin Maynard flew to California and signed agreements with United Microware Industries, Cosmi, Creative Software and Broderbund, some of the biggest suppliers of VIC software at that time.

Audiogenic published software successfully in the UK, but a decision to diversify by importing peripherals, notably the Koala Pad and the Entrepo Quick Data Drive (a continuous loop storage device for the Commodore 64) contributed to a decline in profitability which led to the company ceasing to trade in 1985. Martin Maynard returned to the audio duplication business, and is still operating Sounds Good Ltd now located in Southport, Merseyside.

== Second company ==
The second Audiogenic, Audiogenic Software Limited was formed to acquire the assets and goodwill of the original company. Although financed and controlled by Supersoft, run by Peter Calver and Pearl Wellard, a minority stake was held by Martin Maynard. At this time the company employed Darryl Still, who produced a number of successful releases for the BBC Micro, such as Psycastria and Thunderstruck, written by former members of the Icon Software team in North East England. Peter Scott and Gary Partis amongst them. Maynard left the board in 1987 and Still went on to manage the launch of the Atari ST, Lynx handheld and Jaguar consoles in Europe, before stints with Electronic Arts and Nvidia.

In 1996 the Audiogenic came to an arrangement with Codemasters as a result of which the latter acquired the development team behind the Brian Lara series of cricket games, and the following year the company ceased developing new titles. Peter Calver still owns Supersoft and Audiogenic, but now runs LostCousins, a family history website.

== Games ==
Audiogenic published and/or developed many popular games for a variety of computers and games consoles. The company's first release in 1985 was Graham Gooch's Test Cricket, which had been developed by Supersoft, and the company continued to release sports games. For many years it was the world's leading producer of cricket games: Brian Lara Cricket and Lara '96 were developed by Audiogenic for the Mega Drive and released by Codemasters - both reached No.1 in the UK charts. Other sports titles included Emlyn Hughes International Soccer, Graham Gooch World Class Cricket, Allan Border Cricket, European Champions, Lothar Matthäus, Super League Manager, Rugby League Coach, World Class Rugby, European Champions, Wembley International Soccer, Wembley Rugby League, Shane Warne Cricket, and Super Tennis Champs.

With Emlyn Hughes International Soccer in 1988 Audiogenic pioneered the concept of a fast-moving sports simulation featuring on-screen commentary, named players and management elements; later with World Class Rugby and then European Champions Audiogenic introduced the concept of sports simulations with a choice of viewpoints.

Other titles included Exterminator (a coin-op conversion), Helter Skelter, Impact, Krusty's Fun House, Bubble & Squeak, Exile, and Loopz.

Loopz, designed by Ian Upton, is one of the few computer games to have been converted to a coin-operated arcade game, and whilst Capcom (the licensee) never brought the game to market, a video of the completed game exists. It was also licensed to Barcrest for release as a skill-with-prizes amusement machine, but this version also failed to make it to market. However versions were released for 18 different computer and video game formats including NES, Game Boy, IBM PC, Amiga and Atari ST. A follow up game, Super Loopz, was licensed to Imagineer for the Super NES and was published for the Amiga by Audiogenic.

== See also ==
- Supersoft
- Brian Lara Cricket series
- Codemasters
