= Graham Gooch World Class Cricket =

1993 video game

- Amiga cover art
- Developer: Audiogenic
- Publishers: Audiogenic; HES
- Designers: Gary Sheinwald; Peter Calver
- Programmer: Gary James Gray
- Artists: David Peacock; Herman Serrano; Richard Beston
- Composer: David Whittaker
- Platforms: Amiga, Atari ST, Commodore 64, MS-DOS
- Release: 1993
- Genre: Sports
- Modes: Single-player, multiplayer

Graham Gooch World Class Cricket is a cricket video game developed and published by Audiogenic in 1993 for the Amiga and IBM PC compatibles. It is endorsed by former England cricketer Graham Gooch.

== Gameplay ==
The player can play either test matches or One Day Internationals. There are three types of bowling fast, spin and swing. The fielding can either be set manually or automatically. There are three difficulty settings to play at, Amateur, Professional and World Class. The game has pseudo-3D graphics with details such as the shadows of players moving as the sun moves. All test sides (in 1993) are included including a World XI team to play as. Batting averages and other statistics are included.

== Versions and updates ==
Graham Gooch World Class Cricket has many different versions available:

- Allan Border Cricket: The Australian release of the game.
- Battle for the Ashes: A cut down version made specifically for the 1993 Ashes Test series.
- Jonty Rhodes II - World Class Cricket: The South African release of the game.
- Brian Lara Cricket: An edition that was initially only available from the Game chain of stores in the UK.
- Brian Lara Cricket '96: An updated version with substantially the same gameplay, and English County sides. Released as Shane Warne Cricket in Australia - with state teams replacing county sides.

There were two updates for the game:

- Graham Gooch's Second Innings: This update disk required the original game to work, it contained all the updated statistics from 1994. The expansion also added the ability to play "classic" matches such as the 1990 test where Graham Gooch scored his highest score, 333. The ability to play as an English county team is added.
- Graham Gooch World Class Cricket - Test Match Special Edition: This version of the game combines the original game with the 2nd Innings update.

== Ports ==
A Jaguar conversion of the original game was in development by Williams Brothers Developments and was shown at SCES '94 in a non-playable state. It was planned for release by Telegames in the first quarter of 1995, then moved to Q2 1995, but Atari Corporation exited the home video game console market and the port was never completed.

== Legacy ==
After Graham Gooch's World Class Cricket, Audiogenic developed Brian Lara Cricket for the Sega Mega Drive which was licensed to Codemasters. In 1996 Codemasters took over the Audiogenic development team and then went on to release a series of cricket games under the Brian Lara and Shane Warne brands. Brian Lara Cricket is a rebranded version of Graham Gooch World Class Cricket.
