= Graham Gooch's Test Cricket =

1985 video game

- Developer: Audiogenic
- Publisher: Audiogenic
- Designer: Michael McLean
- Platforms: Acorn Electron, BBC Micro, C64, ZX Spectrum, Amstrad CPC, Amstrad PCW
- Release: 1985
- Genre: Sports
- Modes: Single-player, multiplayer

Graham Gooch's Test Cricket is a 1985 cricket game released for the Acorn Electron, BBC Micro, Commodore 64 and ZX Spectrum by Audiogenic. It was later reissued by budget label Alternative Software as Graham Gooch's Match Cricket.

== Gameplay ==
Graham Gooch's Test Cricket has two modes of play, arcade and simulation.

- Arcade mode is for one player where the player picks the type of match and the players. During the match the player controls the action. When batting the player can move the batsman around the crease and choose the shot to play. Timing is important to performing the shot successfully.
- Simulation mode is where the player can make tactical decisions but the actual play is done by the computer. The player can only watch the game, and make decisions on how his team plays.

== Reception ==
At the time of release, Graham Gooch's Test Cricket was considered the most accurate cricket game out by reviewers. It received high scores for gameplay and graphics but lower scores for the sound, which is because it consisted of basic and few sound effects. Spectrum magazine CRASH rated the game 65% and commented that it is the "best cricket simulation yet on the spectrum". Graham Gooch's Test Cricket was rated poorly by Your Sinclair magazine, scoring just three out of ten. The magazine's main complaints were with the gameplay, such as not being able to change the fielding settings and unrealistic run rates.

== See also ==
- Graham Gooch World Class Cricket
- Brian Lara Cricket (series)
