= Brian Lara Cricket =

1994 video game

- Developer: Audiogenic
- Publisher: Codemasters
- Series: Brian Lara Cricket
- Platforms: Mega Drive, MS-DOS, Amiga
- Release: 1994: MS-DOS; May 12, 1995: Mega Drive
- Genre: Sports
- Modes: Single-player, multiplayer

Reception

Review scores
Publication	Score
Hyper	SMD: 86%
Games World	87%
Sega Magazine	SMD: 87/100

Brian Lara Cricket is a cricket video game, the first in the Brian Lara Cricket series. It is endorsed by Brian Lara. Brian Lara Cricket was released for MS-DOS in 1994 and in 1995 for the Mega Drive and Amiga by Codemasters. The game was rereleased in 1999 under the Codemaster Classics brand for Windows. It was developed by Audiogenic. The game is a rebranded version of Graham Gooch World Class Cricket.

== Gameplay ==
The game supports one to four players and has three modes of difficulty. It also features real player names such as Dion Nash, Michael Slater and Brian Lara (Brian Lara is the only player that endorses the game). The player can choose to play either a one-day game or a Test match and choose from all the major cricketing nations to play as or against. There are three main types of bowling in the game fast, spin and swing. Fielding can be manual or automatic.

== Development ==
Brian Lara Cricket has pseudo-3D graphics which appears to make the perspective change when playing the game. The sound effects in the game are digitised. The game included the NVR save feature which allowed games to be stored using a battery to supply power to the memory inside the cartridge. It also claims to have hundreds of frames of animation for each sprite.

== Reception ==
Reception in the United Kingdom was generally positive. Computer and Video Games awarded the Mega Drive version 77%, while Mean Machines Sega gave it 88%, praising the game's accessible controls and its success in translating the complexities of cricket into an engaging console sports game. The latter considered the game accessible even to players unfamiliar with cricket while retaining enough precision and depth for experienced players.

Australian magazine Hyper awarded the game 86%, describing it as a classic and praising its deceptively simple gameplay and depth. The magazine considered it easy to begin playing but difficult to master, while criticising its comparatively modest graphics and sound.

== Commercial performance ==
Codemasters initially manufactured 20,000 Mega Drive cartridges of Brian Lara Cricket, anticipating relatively modest demand. According to company co-founder David Darling, the initial production run sold out within three days, prompting orders of 10,000 to 15,000 copies and 24-hour production at the company's factory. Codemasters ultimately manufactured approximately 80,000 units before switching production to Brian Lara Cricket '96. It was the eighth-best-selling cartridge game in the United Kingdom during 1995, according to figures published by the Entertainment and Leisure Software Publishers Association. In 1996, Sega Ozisoft described Brian Lara Cricket as one of the biggest-selling titles in the history of the Mega Drive. In Australia, Brian Lara Cricket topped the Mega Drive game chart supplied by retailer The Gamesmen to Hyper magazine for four consecutive issues between August and November 1995.

== Legacy ==
The game began the Brian Lara Cricket series, which continued under Lara's name until 2007. In a 2024 interview, Lara recalled receiving sales figures for the games and attending launches at which young players competed against him. He said that people around the world continued to speak to him about the series decades later and that he was proud of its success.
