= Brian Lara International Cricket 2007 =

2007 video game

- Developer(s): Codemasters
- Publisher(s): Codemasters
- Series: Brian Lara Cricket
- Platform(s): Microsoft Windows, PlayStation 2, Xbox 360
- Release: EU: 23 March 2007; AU: 29 March 2007
- Genre(s): Sports
- Mode(s): Single player, multiplayer

Brian Lara International Cricket 2007 is a cricket video game from Codemasters available on PlayStation 2, PC and Xbox 360. It is endorsed by West Indian cricketer Brian Lara. It is the sequel to Brian Lara International Cricket 2005. It was released on 23 March 2007 during the 2007 Cricket World Cup.

The game was released in Australia and New Zealand under the name of Ricky Ponting International Cricket 2007 and in India as Yuvraj Singh International Cricket 2007.

== Gameplay ==
There are several game modes, such as ICC World Cup, Test matches, One Day Internationals, ICC Champions Trophy, Twenty20, Bowling, Fielding, Batting practice as well as net practice sliced in with 16 tutorial mini games. It is the first cricket video game to have online play included.

Commentary is provided by Jonathan Agnew, David Gower, Ian Bishop, Bill Lawry and Tony Greig.

== Release ==
=== Codemasters Open Day ===
Codemasters held an open day in October 2006 which was attended by six staff members at PlanetCricket and one member from the Codemasters forum. The seven were shown the game being developed as well as given a demo of the current alpha build. Another open day was planned for 2 March 2007 where gamers got the chance to try out the new game.

=== Demo ===
On 9 March 2007, Codemasters released a playable demo of Brian Lara International Cricket 2007. The demo allowed the player to complete 3 overs of batting and bowling using the national cricket teams of England and Australia. It was available for download from the official website for PC users, and the Xbox Live Marketplace for Xbox 360 users.

== Reception ==
Initial reviews of Brian Lara International Cricket 2007 were mixed. The game was viewed as a solid replacement for Brian Lara International Cricket 2005 with improvements in most areas. There was criticism, where reviewers complained of a lack of improvement in the graphics despite being a next generation game, and the gameplay being too easy. Other reviews commented on how the game might not appeal to non cricket fans. Also criticised is the lack of statistical tracking that occurs during television coverage of cricket despite claims it emulates the coverage well. The game has been praised for its relatively realistic simulation of real cricket.
