= Wizards & Warriors (disambiguation) =

Wizards & Warriors is a 1987 game from Rare Ltd.

Wizards and Warriors may also refer to:

- Wizards & Warriors II, sequel to first game
- Wizards & Warriors III, third entry in the series
- Wizards & Warriors X: The Fortress of Fear, a Game Boy entry in the Wizards & Warriors series
- Wizards and Warriors (TV series)
- Wizards & Warriors (2000 video game), a role-playing video game for Microsoft Windows
- Wizards & Warriors (High Fantasy), a 1982 role-playing game adventure for High Fantasy

== See also ==
- Flashing Swords! 3: Warriors and Wizards, a 1976 fantasy anthology
