= Ste and John Pickford =

English video game designers

Steven Joseph Pickford and John Andrew Pickford, known collectively as Ste and John Pickford and the Pickford brothers, are English video game designers. They are the founders of the indie game company Zee-3.

== Biography ==
A comic book designer, Ste started to make designs on his brother John's ZX Spectrum in the early 1980s. At the age of 16, Ste received a work experience placement, and eventually was hired full-time, at John's employer, Binary Design. While on placement, he made loading screens, and on his first full day as a designer, he designed the animation of the hand used in the darts game 180. Within the first year of employment at Binary Design, Ste managed the company sound and music department, and he was making designs for many other games. The first game the Pickford brothers co-designed was Zub in 1986. After about a year at Binary Design, the Pickford brothers decided to forgo university study to found their own company Zippo Games, making about £5000 per year.

At Zippo Games, the Pickford brothers originally co-developed games for the Amiga and Atari ST 16-bit computers, but then they started working under contract with Ashby De La Zouch-based company Rare, developing games for the Nintendo Entertainment System. According to Ste: "The NES seemed primitive by comparison, sub-Commodore 64. But the games were ten times better than everything being released for home computers, which we appreciated, and we wanted to try to make games as good as that." The Pickford brothers would go on to develop the two sequels to Wizards & Warriors – Ironsword and Kuros: Visions of Power. Ste would become Zippo Games' lead designer and producer, as the company was being bought by Rare to become Rare Manchester in 1990.

Shortly afterwards, Ste accepted a job at John's new employer, Software Creations, as a designer and eventually as art director for 16-bit and higher consoles such as the Super NES and PlayStation. In a Retro Gamer interview, Ste Pickford said that his greatest accomplishment was completing Ken Griffey, Jr. Presents Major League Baseball, which he said "was the first time NOA (Nintendo of America) had ever contracted a third-party developer to write a game from scratch, and we did it on time, under budget, and made a great job of the project." The brothers also produced Plok, which remains one of the few titles in which they still have the intellectual rights for.

After managerial clashes with Software Creations, Ste and John resigned and formed another studio, called Zed Two, in their house, where they developed their first game under their new company, called Wetrix. The company lasted until December 2002, where contract and payment failures forced them to sell their company to Warthog Games. Zed Two remained in existence until 2004, when Warthog Games was forced to sell their entire company to Tiger Telematics. The last game developed under Zed Two was Future Tactics: The Uprising in 2004.

With little money to work with and working from home, Ste and John decided to go into indie game development, founding Zee-3 in 2005. Publishing games from their own website, the Pickford brothers' first critically acclaimed indie title was Naked War, a turn-based strategy game. Since then, they have split their time between designing indie games and working as consultants for other UK developers. In an interview with Retro Gamer, Ste claims that his best years were as an indie game developer, citing mainstream companies were preventing him and his colleagues from reaching their fullest potential in making good games.

The Pickford brothers criticized the British Academy of Film and Television Arts for the high fees the academy charges in order to be considered for a nomination for the British Academy Video Games Awards, which they say prevents indie developers and games from receiving recognition for their work and restricting such recognition for major publishers and developers. However, in March 2012, Ste Pickford was nominated for a BAFTA Video Game Award for his and John's development of Magnetic Billiards: Blueprint. In response, Ste Pickford responded that "it shows that great games are all about great ideas and playability, not enormous budgets and massive marketing campaigns".

== Credited works ==
The following lists all games credited to the Pickford brothers:

Freelance

- Graffix (1983, graphics editor)
- Ghost Town (1984)
- Ziggurat (1985)
- Ghosts'n Goblins (1986)
- Die You Vicious Fish (1987)
- Duet (1987)
- Knight Games 2 (1987)
- Leviathan (1987)

Doodlebug Designs

- Guy Mannly (1985, cancelled)

Binary Design

- Death Wake (1986)
- Max Headroom (1986)
- Hocus Focus (1986)
- Mission Omega (1986)
- Glass (1986)
- Kobayashi Naru (1987)
- Glider Rider (1986)
- 180 (1986)
- Xeno (1986)
- Zub (1986)
- Lightfarce (1986)
- Hyperbowl (1986)
- Defcom (1987)
- Feud (1987)
- Street Surfer (1987)
- Motos (1987)
- Rasterscan (1987)
- Amaurote (1987)
- Outcast / Renegade (1987)
- World Darts (1988)

Zippo Games

- Roadhugg (1988, Amiga, cancelled)
- Cluster (1988, Atari ST, cancelled)
- Cosmic Pirate (1988)
- Voodoo Nightmare (1988)
- Urchin (1989, cancelled)
- Wolverine (1989, cancelled)
- Roller Thrasher (1989, cancelled)
- Sesame Street A-B-C and 1-2-3 (1989)
- Ironsword: Wizards & Warriors II (1989)
- Solar Jetman: Hunt for the Golden Warpship (1990)
- WWF WrestleMania (1990, Game Boy, cancelled)
- Fleapit (1990, cancelled)
- Cabal (1990)
- Wizards & Warriors III: Kuros: Visions of Power (1992)

Active Minds

- Gazza 2 (1990)

Software Creations

- Tom and Jerry (1992)
- Spider-Man and the X-Men in Arcade's Revenge (1992)
- Beauty and the Beast: Belle's Quest (1993)
- Equinox (1993)
- Tasmanian Devil (1993, cancelled)
- The Incredible Crash Dummies (1993)
- Thomas the Tank Engine & Friends (1993)
- Plok! (1993)
- Ken Griffey Jr. Presents Major League Baseball (1994)
- Maximum Carnage (1994)
- Tin Star (1994)
- Venom Spirit (1994, cancelled)
- Waterworld (1994, 3DO/PS1, cancelled)
- Cutthroat Island (1995)
- Spyral Saga (1995, cancelled)
- Blade & Barrel (1995, cancelled)
- Venom/Spider-Man: Separation Anxiety (1995)
- Mario Artist: Paint Studio (1999)

Zed Two

- Vampire Circus (1996, cancelled)
- Wetrix (1998)
- Taz Express (2000)
- Dragon Tales: DragonWings (2000)
- Dragon Tales: DragonSeek (2000)
- Aqua Aqua (2000)
- Dirty Drivin' (2000, cancelled)
- Popper (2001, cancelled)
- E.T. and the Search for Dragora (2001, cancelled)
- E.T. and the Cosmic Garden (2002)
- Worms Blast (2002)
- Tetris (2003, Pocket PC, cancelled)
- Future Tactics: The Uprising (2004)
- Nicktoons Movin' (2004)
- Sticky Balls (2005)

The Pickford Bros (under Zee-3)

- De-Flower (2004, cancelled)
- Naked War (2006)
- Worms v. Lemmings (2006, cancelled)
- Magnetic Billiards: Seriously Casual (2007, cancelled)
- Garfield Gets Real (2009)
- Art of Soccer (2009, cancelled)
- Magnetic Billiards: Blueprint (2010)
- I Sent My Monkey to the Moon (2011, cancelled)
- Magnetic Billiards: Sardines (2012, cancelled)
- 23 Skidoo (TBA)
