= Aqua Aqua =

2000 video game

Aqua Aqua: Wetrix 2
- European box art
- Developer: Zed Two
- Publishers: JP: Imagineer; EU: SCi Games; NA: The 3DO Company
- Designer: Peter Smith
- Engine: RenderWare
- Platform: PlayStation 2
- Release: JP: November 2, 2000; EU: November 24, 2000; NA: December 29, 2000
- Genre: Puzzle
- Modes: Single-player, multiplayer

Aqua Aqua (アクアクア, Akuakua) is a puzzle video game developed by Zed Two, the studio of Ste and John Pickford, for the PlayStation 2. It was published in late 2000 by Imagineer in Japan, and by The 3DO Company in North America and SCi Games in Europe. It is the sequel to Wetrix (1998) and has very similar gameplay; the player, on a landscape, uses Uppers to create walls for enclosures that hold flying water bubbles, contending with hazards like rainstorms, bombs, and ice cubes in the process.

Imagineer commissioned a sequel to Wetrix following the predecessor's critical and commercial success. It was released in 2000 in Europe, North America and Japan as the third PlayStation 2 puzzle game after Fantavision and Super Bust-A-Move, selling 70,000+ copies in the West and 15,000+ in Japan. Aqua Aqua was generally well received by professional critics for its addictiveness, graphics and sound. Criticism was targeted at the steep learning curve, the short length of the Story mode, the fixed camera and loose controls causing imprecise piece placements, and how little advantage was taken with the console's hardware.

== Game modes ==
A level in Aqua Aqua, where a fireball disintegrates the water of a long river, which is in-between two small lakes holding dinosaurs. On the bottom left is an icon indicating the amount of ground on the land, and on the bottom right is the amount of water.

Aqua Aqua's gameplay remains largely unchanged from Wetrix (1998). Described by Electronic Gaming Monthly's Chris Johnston as a combination of Tetris and Civilization, it is a 3D isometric puzzle game where the player builds paddocks on land to prevent falling water bubbles from dripping off the landscape. The enclosures are created by dropping L-shaped, T-shaped and square pieces that raise a part of the landscape named Uppers; there are also Downers that do the opposite, decrease the height of a wall. Fireballs help in the player's goal, in that they evaporate water, and points are earned from it depending on how much water is evaporated. However, there are also hazards such as bombs that create holes on the ground, ice cubes that freeze water, rainstorms that occur in the later stages, and earthquakes triggered when a wall is too high that ruin nearly all of the architecture. The amount of water dripped off the land is showcased by a meter, which the game ends once its full.

Modes include a single-game Quick mode, an eight-level Tutorial, a two-player Versus mode and a four-level Story Mode; the Tutorial must be completed to unlock the Story and Versus modes. In Story, there are three bosses, who attack by ruining the player's structure and must be beaten by achieving a certain score within a limited period. A new feature is a grid for where the Uppers and Downers will land, in addition to the shadows.

== Development and release ==
Aqua Aqua's predecessor, Wetrix, was developed by Zed Two, a small studio owned by Ste and John Pickford. It was conceived out of a water effects demo done for another one of their own games, Vampire Circus, which became Taz Express (2000). Wetrix and Taz Express were published by Ocean Software out of a two-game deal signed a week before the publisher merged with Infogrames. The game's Nintendo 64 release sold 105,000+ copies in the west and 12,000+ in Japan. Additionally, Wetrix was critically acclaimed for its originality in the puzzle game genre, scoring 8/8/8/7 in Famitsu, the magazine's highest for a Western title in years.

The critical and commercial success motivated Japanese company Imagineer, who developed Wetrix's Game Boy Color port, to commission Zed Two to create a sequel for the PlayStation 2. The Pickfords had several ideas. One major plan was to allow the player to expand the width of the land with the falling Uppers, and Imagineer thought of adding a "weird old man". Ultimately, the only major addition was cute-looking characters, done to make the product more appealing to Japanese audiences. Contrary to fan rumors that PlayStation 2 development kits were already in the United States by mid-1999, none had been sent by Sony to companies outside of Japan until October 1999. This meant some Zed Two staff flew to Japan to develop Aqua Aqua.

On June 25, 1999, IGN revealed Zed Two was developing a sequel to Wetrix, not yet named, for the upcoming PlayStation 2 console. On August 27, Zed Two revealed they planned to release it by March 2000. This had been moved to summer 2000 by the time the sequel was presented at the 2000 Tokyo Game Show, where its name, Aqua Aqua, was revealed. Timothy Horst reported that the demo at the Tokyo Game Show appeared to be "pretty much done", and that the game would basically be its predecessor with improved visuals. IGN revealed the game's four modes, as well as the July 2000 Japan date, on April 20, 2000, before it was delayed further to November 2, 2000. The 3DO Company published Aqua Aqua in North America on December 29, 2000, while SCi Games published it in Europe the month before. It was the third puzzle game released for the console after Fantavision and Super Bust-A-Move. Aqua Aqua sold 15,000+ units in Japan, and 70,000+ in the West, numbers GamesTM attributed to its reputation as a PlayStation 2 launch title.

== Reception ==
Reception

Aggregate score
| Aggregator | Score |
|---|---|
| Metacritic | 79/100 |

Review scores
| Publication | Score |
|---|---|
| AllGame | 4/5 |
| Edge | 7/10 |
| Electronic Gaming Monthly | 6/10 |
| EP Daily | 6.5/10 |
| Famitsu | 26/40 |
| Game Informer | 6/10 |
| GameRevolution | C+ |
| GameSpot | 7.1/10 |
| IGN | 7.7/10 |
| Next Generation | 2/5 |
| Official U.S. PlayStation Magazine | 2/5 |

Reviews of Aqua Aqua were generally positive. Containing gameplay and graphics identical to Wetrix, it received the same praises and critiques. "Aqua Aqua has its problems, but it's still the best puzzle game yet to grace the PlayStation 2," wrote GameSpot's Shane Satterfield. In the mind of David Zdyrko of IGN, Aqua Aqua "takes the basic gameplay elements that made its prequel so well liked and has added a lot of neat new features and play mechanics".

Aqua Aqua was highlighted for its addictive quality. Its difficulty and fast pace was also of frequent note, as well as the steep learning curve that critics suggested could turn off those not very experienced in puzzle games. Much criticism was directed at how needlessly tricky it was to place pieces accurately, caused by loose control and a fixed, nonadjustable camera angle; German magazine Video Games reported having to start over the first level several times.

Although praised by IGN as a new edition to the Wetrix series, the Story Mode was generally criticized for being too short, reviewers reported beating it within a few hours. More positively, the Versus mode was lauded by several reviewers for its addictiveness and challenge, while criticized by some for a lack of interaction between players. The graphics was positively-commented on for several aspects such as their colorfulness, although criticized for taking little advantage of console space. The game's ambient techno new age soundtrack was well-received, although critiqued for being repetitive.
