= Adventures in High Fantasy =

TTRPG adventure

Adventures In High Fantasy is a 1981 role-playing game adventure published by Reston Publishing for High Fantasy.

== Contents ==
Adventures In High Fantasy is a supplement which provides three adventures and a set of rules for play with miniatures.

Adventures in High Fantasy features four scenarios, including Fortress Ellendar and Moorguard, and also includes "Terra Ash," which describes a lost and buried temple contested by three warring societies, and "Lord of Conquest," a battle scenario that includes miniatures rules.

== Publication history ==
Adventures in High Fantasy was written by Jeffrey C. Dillow and published by Reston Publishing in 1981 as a 208-page hardcover book and as a softcover book.

== Reception ==
Eric Goldberg reviewed Adventures In High Fantasy in Ares Magazine #9. Goldberg commented that "Dillow's imagination is one of his strongest assets, as can be deduced from a quick perusal of his adventure rationales as shown in the Adventures in High Fantasy book."

Lewis Pulsipher reviewed Adventures In High Fantasy in The Space Gamer No. 51. Pulsipher commented that "Take a look at this book if you get a chance, but unless you play High Fantasy or love set-script adventures, you can find more useful material for your game at a comparable price, with more freedom to pick and choose."
