= Feud (video game) =

1987 video game

- Developer: Binary Design
- Publisher: Bulldog Software
- Designer: John Pickford
- Artist: Ste Pickford
- Platforms: Amiga, Amstrad CPC, Atari 8-bit, Commodore 64, MS-DOS, MSX, ZX Spectrum
- Release: 1987
- Genre: Adventure
- Mode: Single-player

Feud is an adventure game designed by John Pickford for Binary Design and published in 1987 as the first game under the Bulldog Software label of Mastertronic. Versions were released for the Amiga, Amstrad CPC, Atari 8-bit computers, Commodore 64, MS-DOS, MSX, and ZX Spectrum. The player takes on the role of the sorcerer Learic, and must fight his evil brother Leanoric.

== Gameplay ==
Learic (in white robe) and Leanoric finally meet (Atari 8-bit screenshot)

In Feud, the players control Learic who has to fight against his evil brother Leanoric. To achieve the objective, the player must collect many herbs scattered across the map and mix them in a cauldron to make offensive and defensive spells. The spells vary from fireballs and lightning to invisibility and even turning peaceful villagers into zombies. A compass indicates Leanoric's location. Several of the herbs are found in a garden, tended by a gardener. The gardener, though slow-moving, is also able to inflict damage on Learic.

Leanoric, as a non-player character, has to do the same thing, collecting herbs to mix in his cauldron before hunting down in order to attack.

== Development ==
After developing Zub, John Pickford went on to design a game that he wasn't going to program. This required designing the game on paper before development started and overseeing the work of a different programming team.

== Reception ==
Reception

Awards
Publication	Award
Crash	Crash Smash
C+VG	Game of the Month

Reviewer "Ben" for CRASH gave a positive review and called it "brilliant" and "playable". Robert Swan for Atari User magazine praised the game for its "fantastic" graphics, "great" sound, "addictive" gameplay and the low price.
