= Wizards & Warriors (High Fantasy) =

Wizards & Warriors is a 1982 role-playing game adventure published by Reston Publishing for High Fantasy.

== Plot summary ==
Wizards & Warriors is an adventure in which an omnibus edition contains the adventures In the Service of Saena Sephar and Murder in Irliss.

== Publication history ==
Wizards & Warriors was written by Jeffrey C. Dillow and Craig Fisher, with a cover by Jim Steranko and published by Reston Publishing in 1982 as a 300-page hardcover book.

== Reception ==
Robert Plamondon for Dragon called it "a real bargain" for a hardbound at the price.
