= Wetrix =

1998 video game

- North American Nintendo 64 cover art
- Developer: Zed Two
- Publishers: N64, Windows; Ocean Software; Dreamcast: NA: Xicat Interactive; EU: Take-Two Interactive; Game Boy Color: JP: Imagineer; EU: Infogrames Europe
- Designer: Ste and John Pickford
- Programmer: John Pickford
- Artist: Ste Pickford
- Composers: Suddi Raval; Martin Goodall; Keith Tinman
- Platforms: Nintendo 64, Windows, Game Boy Color, Dreamcast
- Release: Nintendo 64: NA: 12 June 1998; EU: 19 June 1998; Windows: EU: 19 June 1998; NA: 15 January 1999; Game Boy Color: JP: 29 October 1999; EU: 29 September 2000; Dreamcast: NA: 16 December 1999; EU: 31 March 2000
- Genre: Puzzle
- Modes: Single-player, multiplayer

Wetrix is a 3D puzzle video game developed by Zed Two, the studio of brothers Ste and John Pickford, for the Nintendo 64 and personal computers in 1998, and the Dreamcast and Game Boy Color in 1999 (as Wetrix+ and Wetrix GB respectively). The player's goal is to hold water bubbles falling on a 3D isometric landscape. To do this, enclosures are created with Uppers, which fall in a similar manner to Tetris blocks, that raise the ground. While water can be evaporated with fireballs, hazards such as Mines, Ice Cubes, and earthquakes also fall and ruin the player's construction.

The Pickfords conceived a Tetris-esque puzzle game out of a water demo they worked on for another one of their Zed Two games, the hack and slash Vampire Circus. For design, the biggest focus was on the basic elements' interaction with each other, as well as the puzzle game style's originality; the use of falling blocks was the only similarity between Wetrix and Tetris. Zed Two signed a two-game deal with Ocean Software, a week before its merge with Infogrames. It required the brothers to turn Vampire Circus into Taz Express (2000), while allowing the brothers free rein with Wetrix. The PC version was produced from January to October 1997 by the brothers themselves, while the Nintendo 64 port was developed with three additional programmers from around June to Christmas 1997.

The Nintendo 64 version sold over 105,000 units in the West, and just above 12,000 in Japan, while the PC version sold 30,000 copies. Wetrix was generally well-received by critics, who applauded its addictiveness and original concept but were critical of the limited camera mobility and divided on its difficulty, steep learning curve, and two-player mode. It garnered the highest rating for a review of a Western-developed title from the Japanese magazine Famitsu Weekly in years. The critical and commercial success motivated Imagineer, developers of the Game Boy Color port, to commission Zed Two to develop a sequel, the PlayStation 2 launch title Aqua Aqua, which made little alterations to the main gameplay.

== Gameplay ==
The second level of Wetrix, an isometric puzzle video game. As an L-shaped Upper is about to fall, so is an ice cube that will freeze the water. There is also a rainbow filling the currently-made rivers.

Wetrix is an isometric puzzle video game where the player, on a square landscape, produces mounds to hold water bubbles falling from the sky. Uppers, pieces that raise a part of the landscape that come in the shapes of rectangles, squares, and T-shapes, create walls for the lakes, while Downers do the opposite. If there is no wall in its way, water will seep off the edges and into a drain represented by a water meter; the game ends once it is full. Fireballs pop up which can evaporate water, which gives the player an amount of points depending on how much water was vaporized. By evaporating water with fireballs, the player is also able to reduce the level of the drain in order to avoid losing. There are also hazards that ruin the player's structure, such as Mines which blast holes into the ground, Ice Cubes that freeze the water, and earthquakes that quickly turn the landscape flat once it is too high.

In addition to the regular Classic mode, Wetrix has Pro, which quickens the speed of the game, and Practice, which teaches basic rules. Challenge modes include those that end after a certain amount of time, such as one minute and five minutes, and others that must be survived within a number of pieces, including 100 and 500. There are also Handicap modes that start a game with a half-full water drain, an ice layer, Raised Land, Random Land, and Random Holes. The only multi-player feature is a two-player split screen battle mode, with the same goal as Classic but a different water meter with four colored spaces. One player can launch an attack at the other depending on which color space the water level is at; the meter also can not be lowered by evaporating a lake with a fireball.

== Development ==
=== Origins ===
In the mid-1990s, brothers Ste and John Pickford, developers at Software Creations, were dissatisfied with the stillborn projects and perceived declining creativity at the studio. They left to form their own independent company, Zed Two, in an attempt to "re-learn game design from the very basics". The studio's first project was Vampire Circus, a 3D isometric hack and slash video game in the style of Gauntlet (1985). John conceived programming methods that would have taken the most advantage of the available technology, such as having hundreds of foes on the screen at a time, and animating environmental elements in a "dynamic" manner. The environmental animations would be incorporated by having almost every part of the level be inflammable, and including flowing water that reacts to the explosions.

While Ste created the backgrounds and monsters, John experimented with water animation in a "testbed" separate from Vampire Circus's code. Unlike other 3D games at the time that used a flat plane moving up and down as water, Vampire Circus was planned to have water moving as a "dynamic fluid". The testbed consisted of a flat plane grid of vectors. Drops of water would fall onto them and combine to form pools of liquid that flowed and dropped off the plane. To further test the water meshing, John programmed the ability to shift the vectors of the plane. The water was a success.

The Pickfords' personal enjoyment of the water demo then gave them the idea to turn it into its own puzzle game. The game was initially named, as a joke, Wetris, but the title was later changed to something less similar to Tetris, Wetrix. Zed Two planned to release it as their first product before Vampire Circus. In their mind, the game would be cheaper and simpler to create, thus less of a risk to potential publishers, than Vampire Circus. Therefore, it could be used to make them established enough to produce the more ambitious hack and slash project.

However, as the Pickfords realized when searching for deals, "publishers only wanted big, ambitious expensive games, and weren't interested in cheap, small games, even if they were profitable", explained Ste. When pitching the puzzle game to Ocean Software, it did not initially grasp the publisher. However, within a week, the water demo was heavily played by testers, as well as a receptionist in-between calls. This won Zed Two a deal with Ocean to publish two games: Vampire Circus and Wetrix. Ocean required the small studio to turn Vampire Circus into a game starring the Tasmanian Devil, which became Taz Express (2000). However, the brothers were allowed free rein with Wetrix. This was the last deal Ocean made, as it began its merging into Infogrames a week later.

=== Design ===
Much brainstorming was done on what type of puzzle game to produce, such as being in the style of Lemmings (1991) or The Incredible Machine series, but they ultimately settled on a Tetris-esque game. Wetrix was the Pickfords' first puzzle video game, a genre that was "surprisingly difficult" for them. Explained Ste, "we tried to think about the thought processes and the emotions involved in playing a great puzzle game -- then tried to re-create and enhance those experiences with our own gameplay." A majority of the Pickfords' focus was on the basic elements of the gameplay, particularly their interaction between each other. Ste described the visuals for the "simplest elements" as the hardest to get right, even more than the special effects; he recalled creating "eight or nine" variations of the uppers and downers, and "quite a few" for the water bubbles. Although a Tetris-style game was the initial concept, the only overlap between the two puzzle games was blocks falling to the ground. From the Pickfords' perspective, most other Tetris-inspired titles made too little changes to the rules, so they intended for Wetrix to be more original. One method was a creativity aspect, where there were infinite ways to build the landscape and, thus, players could experiment with different methods of scoring points.

=== Production ===
Zed Two began the Wetrix project as a PC title, with no plans for porting to consoles. This was because, at the time, no small independent studio had the budget to develop for major consoles. After Zed Two's inquisition, a friend of the Pickfords, who worked at Software Creations, used the PC source to secretly code a Nintendo 64 port with the Manchester company's development kit. The programmer showed the brothers and Ocean the cartridge a week after the deal, and Ocean approved. Then, at an E3 conference, the brothers showed it to Nintendo for approval. As Ste recalled the Japanese company's reaction, "We booted up the game in the meeting room, they took one look and just said, 'Yep, we need all the games we can get!' And that was it, we were in business!"

The PC version was mostly only done by the Pickfords from January to October 1997, while a different team consisting of Amir Latif, David Gill, and Jan van Valburg programmed the Nintendo 64 release from around June to Christmas 1997. The brothers had no other source of income, meaning finishing either Wetrix or Vampire Circus needed to be done quickly to pay their rent. This budget limitation meant having to resort to a pre-made 3D model built into a package of 3D Studio 4 for the rubber duck. The polygon meshing and animations for the water flowing and 3D landscape shifting up and down were the easiest parts of development. John described the water animation as "a simple cellular system where each cell compares itself with its neighbours and exchanges water if there's a difference".

== Release and ports ==
IGN was the first publication to announce Wetrix on 14 August 1997, although only the Nintendo 64 version. It revealed Zed Two to be the developer, Ocean the publisher, and with no screenshot, only had the following description: "players must create (or open) channels of water and evaporate it using balloons that also fall onto the screen. The more water you dispose of the more points you acquire." On 12 March 1998, the cover art was revealed, and the date for the Nintendo 64 version was set at April 1998. It was delayed to June 1998, IGN suspecting it was due to issues of manufacturing copies.

In North America, the Nintendo 64 version of Wetrix was released on 12 June 1998. Ocean released the Nintendo 64 and PC versions on 19 June 1998 in Europe. Imagineer published the game on 27 November 1998 in Japan. It sold over 105,000 units in the West, and just above 12,000 in Japan. Despite selling well, Wetrix had its budget cut by Infogrames, which was moved to other projects, feeling the puzzle title would not fit their reputation of producing "mega hit" games. This prevented Ocean US from selling more copies of the Nintendo 64 version than they did, and caused a seven-player LAN mode the brothers worked on to remain unfinished. The PC version was announced by Infogrames on 19 November 1998, and released on 15 January 1999, selling 30,000 copies worldwide.

Ocean hired Imagineer to develop a Game Boy Color port. Although the IP rights were held between Ocean and Zed Two, the port's development began without the knowledge of the Pickfords. The brothers were angry once they found out. Ocean and Zed Two settled by having the latter hold intellectual property rights for future iterations. John also created his own prototype of a Wetrix water level on the Game Boy Color, but Imagineer went with theirs instead. The port was released in Japan on 29 October 1999 and in Europe on 29 September 2000. The Dreamcast port, Wetrix+ was released by Xicat Interactive in the United States on 16 December 1999 with distribution handled by Acclaim Entertainment, and by Take-Two Interactive in Europe on 31 March 2000. A Japanese version of Wetrix for the Dreamcast, named Aquapanic, was commissioned but dropped near its completion, at the end of the console's lifespan.

== Reception ==
Reception

Aggregate scores
Aggregator	Score			
Aggregator	Dreamcast	GBC	N64	PC
GameRankings	72%	N/A	78.94%	64%
Metacritic	N/A	N/A	81/100	N/A

Review scores
Publication	Score			
Publication	Dreamcast	GBC	N64	PC
AllGame	4/5	N/A	4/5	4.5/5
Computer Games Strategy Plus	N/A	N/A	N/A	1.5/5
Consoles +	50%	N/A	75%	N/A
Computer and Video Games	N/A	N/A	4/5	N/A
Edge	N/A	N/A	7/10	N/A
Electronic Gaming Monthly	N/A	N/A	5.5/10; 5.5/10; 6/10; 5.5/10	N/A
EP Daily	7.5/10	N/A	8/10	N/A
Famitsu	N/A	N/A	31/40	N/A
Game Informer	5/10	N/A	8.25/10	N/A
GamePro	N/A	N/A	4.5/5; 4/5; 4/5; 4/5	N/A
GameSpot	6/10	N/A	8.8/10	6.8/10
GameSpy	8/10	N/A	N/A	N/A
Hyper	84/100	N/A	83%	78/100
IGN	8.7/10	N/A	8.4/10	7.8/10
Jeuxvideo.com	15/20	N/A	N/A	N/A
N64 Magazine	N/A	N/A	74%	N/A
Next Generation	N/A	N/A	3/5	N/A
Nintendo Power	N/A	N/A	7.4/10	N/A
Official Nintendo Magazine	N/A	70%	91%	N/A
PC Zone	N/A	N/A	N/A	5/10
DC-UK	7/10	N/A	N/A	N/A
Ultimate PC	N/A	N/A	N/A	81/100

Wetrix received generally positive reviews, including one in Famitsu, which had the highest rating for a Western-developed product in years. A common highlight was its unique puzzle game concept, which Nintendo Power described as a mixture of Tetris and Populous (1989). Due to the fact that it involves falling pieces, Wetrix was heavily compared to not only Tetris entries, but the Nintendo 64 titles Tetrisphere and Bust-A-Move 2 (1998). Some found its spin on Tetris elements refreshing, given the amount of other titles that copied Tetris mechanics without doing anything innovative. IGN noted that with previous puzzle video games, "the further developers got from Tetris, the more annoyed people got", making Wetrix's success as both an original and enjoyable puzzle game profound.

The high difficulty and steep learning curve generally garnered a mixed response. Critics suggested that while it would appeal to hardcore puzzle game veterans, it may not be suited for all players, especially first-timers. Reviewers from Edge and N64 Magazine claimed an individual's first playthrough can end in seconds. The challenge was attributed to the controls, fast object dropping, and the randomization of what falls. Official Nintendo Magazine found the Game Boy Color port inferior to the original Nintendo 64 release for its slower falling speed. The PC version was criticized for its controls. GameSpot's Ron Dulin had trouble placing pieces with the mouse, and Ward struggled with the controls overall, especially the keyboard setups. Also brought up was the game's addictiveness. It was attributed to the difficulty, high-score list, multipliers, different methods of earning points, visual rewards, and additional modes.

Supporters of the challenge argued that it teaches players to long-term plan and not panic over small water drains. Detractors complained it was artificial and made the game more obnoxious than enjoyable. Jeff Gerstmann of GameSpot criticized the earthquake mechanic for effectively ending games, and opined it prevented Wetrix from being a truly amazing puzzle title. Reviewers also brought up the general product's limited depth and replay-ability. For them, the experience was repetitive due to a lack of variation in gameplay and level aesthetics, wearing thin after a few hours.

Reviewers found it excessively tricky to position the falling pieces, an issue mostly attributed to the limited camera mobility. There are only three choices for viewing the map; critics thought two were distant to the point of harming visibility, and another was too close to see the entire map. The problem was also blamed on misleading shadows and other visuals that distracted the player from them. Water trickles were also hard to spot from the few choices of angles, not helped by the draining water's lack of graphical detail, argued Fish and Game Informer critics Jon and Reiner. Official Nintendo Magazine criticized the Game Boy Color version's color palette for making it hard to notice the location of lakes.

The two-player mode divided critics. Its supporters highlighted its competitive nature, a result of each player having to focus on keeping their own board intact while attacking the opponent. Others were underwhelmed. Schneider and Ricciardi found it weaker than two-player modes in other puzzle titles, such as Puzzle Bobble (1994) and those of the Tetris series. A common complaint was the decreased size of each player's map as a result of the split-screen, causing the pieces to be even harder to view. Official Nintendo Magazine reviewer Shaun White disliked the mode's slow pace and expressed annoyance towards attacks temporarily obscuring the playing fields. Fielder and Gantayat also criticized the lack of four-player modes, such as tournaments and two-on-twos.

The graphics, particularly how well it compared to other video games of the contemporaneous generation, divided critics, ranging from high praise to dislike. Most of the praise was directed at the water, particularly its realistic flowing, ripple effects, transparency and reflection mapping. Other praised aspects include the special effects, the vibrant color palette and psychedelic backgrounds. Wetrix's new age ambient techno soundtrack was well-received for suiting the gameplay, Schneider analogizing it as if Jean-Michel Jarre composed Top Gear Rally (1997). The sound effects were positively-commented on, a common note being their accuracy to real-life environmental elements, such as the splashes, ripples, and evaporation of water and the explosion of bombs. The electronically-altered announcer voice was another highlight.

== Legacy ==
Wetrix's critical and commercial success inspired Imagineer to commission Zed Two to develop a sequel, Aqua Aqua (2000), which was a launch title for the PlayStation 2. The gameplay remained largely unaltered, new features including a Story Mode with bosses and cute-looking characters that Imagineer commanded Zed Two to add to make the product more appealing to Japanese audiences. Despite a positive critical reception and decent sales, there have been no further Wetrix titles.
