= High Fantasy Judges Screen =

High Fantasy Judges Screen is a 1981 role-playing game supplement published by Reston Publishing for High Fantasy.

== Contents ==
Judges Screen is a supplement in which a gamemaster's screen comes with 25 character sheets.

== Publication history ==
Judges Screen was written by Jeffrey C. Dillow and published by Reston Publishing in 1981 as a cardstock screen with 25 sheets.
