= Goldchester: More Adventures in High Fantasy =

Goldchester: More Adventures in High Fantasy is a 1982 role-playing game adventure published by Reston Publishing for High Fantasy.

== Plot summary ==
Goldchester: More Adventures in High Fantasy is an adventure in which five distinct adventure scenarios all unfold within or around the city of Goldchester. The book provides an extensive description of the town itself.

== Publication history ==
Goldchester: More Adventures in High Fantasy was written by Jeffrey C. Dillow and published by Reston Publishing in 1982 as a 245 page book, in both hardcover and softcover editions.
