= Naked War =

2006 turn-based strategy video game

- Logo
- Developer: Zee3
- Publisher: Zee3
- Programmer: Ste and John Pickford
- Series: Naked War
- Engine: Scaffold
- Platform: Windows
- Release: October 2006
- Genres: turn-based strategy Play-by-mail game
- Mode: Multiplayer

Naked War is a 2006 turn-based strategy video game for two players, developed by Ste and John Pickford.

In 2011 it was made free to download.

== Gameplay ==
Each player takes the role of a military commander controlling a squad of four soldiers on an island. A player issues orders then hits the 'send' button to send the turn to his opponent, before watching the results on his PC. The opposing player receives the turn as an email attachment. Each turn takes about four minutes.

== Reception ==
Naked War

Aggregate score
Aggregator	Score
Metacritic	83/100

Review scores
Publication	Score
Eurogamer	8/10
GamesTM	90%
PC Format	82%
PC Gamer (UK)	80%
PC Zone	85%

In 2011, it was listed in the book 1001 Video Games You Must Play Before You Die.
