= High Fantasy (role-playing game) =

Fantasy role-playing game

High Fantasy is a fantasy role-playing game system originally published by Fantasy Productions in 1978. A second edition in 1981 and several subsequent books were published by Reston Publishing that featured solo adventures using the High Fantasy system. The game received mixed reviews in game periodicals including White Dwarf, The Space Gamer, Different Worlds, Ares, and Dragon.

== Description ==
High Fantasy is a fantasy role-playing system similar to Dungeons & Dragons.

== Gameplay ==
=== Character generation ===
Basic attributes are determined randomly. The player can choose one of four main character classes: warriors, wizards, animal masters, and alchemists (who may make and use firearms).

=== Magic ===
Using magic utilizes a spell-point magic system.

=== Combat ===
The melee combat system uses percentile dice (a random roll from 1–100). The player's character rolls percentile dice and compares that number to the opponent's chance to dodge, and the difference between these numbers determines if the hit is successful.

=== Gaining experience ===
Characters gain experience for successful adventures, enabling them to advance in skill levels.

=== Monsters ===
The rules include brief monster descriptions.

== Publication history ==
While Jeffrey C. Dillow was attending Indiana University, he started to play the original edition of Dungeons & Dragons. Unsatisfied with the rules, Dillow wrote his own set of rules and started to run games for his fellow students. After graduation, Dillow and his wife formed Fantasy Productions in 1978, printed 100 copies of the rules as a 44-page book with an orange cover titled High Fantasy, and began to sell them a games conventions. The Dillows used their profits to publish a second printing with a cream cover. This brought them to the attention of Twinn K, a maker of slot cars looking to diversify. This partnership enabled Fantasy Productions to publish a third printing with a color cover.

A second edition was published by Reston Publishing, a subsidiary of Prentice Hall, in 1981 as a 208-page hardcover book, a 208-page softcover book, and a boxed set including two books, five character sheets, and dice. The second edition included a 73-page introductory solo scenario, Escape from Queztec'l, with 360 numbered scenes. (The player's character is in the city of Queztec'l for a religious festival when General Tezcaloz'l and his minions attack the city, killing everyone they can find. The object of the adventure is to escape from the city.)

As the High Fantasy gaming system gained in popularity, additional adventure books were added, including

- Fortress Ellendar (1979)
- Moorguard (1980).
- Adventures In High Fantasy (1981)
- Judges Screen (1981)
- In the Service of Saena Sephar (1982)
- Murder in Irliss (1982),
- Wizards & Warriors (a hardcover book containing both In the Service of Saena Sephar and Murder in Irliss.)
- Goldchester: More Adventures in High Fantasy (1982)

== Reception ==
In the June/July 1980 edition of White Dwarf (Issue #19), Don Turnbull did not think this new role-playing system stood a chance in the over-crowded marketplace already dominated by Advanced Dungeons & Dragons (AD&D), saying, "in the case of any new role-playing game nowadays, any rating on review has to take account, not just of objective judgment of the game but also of its likely impact on a market which is already dominated [...] Whether you are likely to enjoy the game-system is not entirely the point: the question is - will the game-system contain enough material which fits your personal taste to the extent that it tempts you away from whatever system you are using at present [...] I believe that the High Fantasy rules are too lightweight for that. So my ratings are based on the degree to which High Fantasy materials will compete with D&D or be compatible with D&D and (in the case of modules) the degree to which these make a significant contribution to material which would be grafted onto a D&D format." Turnbull concluded by giving the game system a dismal rating of only 4 out of 10.

In the August 1980 edition of The Space Gamer (Issue No. 30), Ronald Pehr commented that "High Fantasy can work. If a referee is willing to put the time into developing a background world, if players can identify with characters who exist only as Offense, Defense, and Innate Ability, and if people do what they did with the original D&D and put in some necessary reforging on the rules, High Fantasy can be a good game. If the designer would double the size (and price) to give us more background and explain away some of the rules glitches, High Fantasy could be very good. If you like simple abstract systems with which you can tinker to your heart's content, High Fantasy has something to offer. If you need more than that you might want to wait for High Fantasy II, or stick with the games you already play."

Anders Swenson reviewed High Fantasy for Different Worlds magazine and stated that "High Fantasy is a system with a difference, but not much else. I'm not going to change any of my gaming rules because of this book, which is unusual ·- I almost always find some neat twists in the latest set of rules I've read."

Eric Goldberg reviewed High Fantasy in Ares Magazine #9 and commented that "High Fantasy tries to negotiate the fine line between the simple and the simplistic, but falls on the wrong side. The game should work well when played with the designer and friends, which does not help the several thousand who have not had the luck to meet Mr. Dillow."

In the May 1982 edition of The Space Gamer (Issue No. 51), Lewis Pulsipher was not impressed by the writing or production values of the second edition High Fantasy, saying, "There is no reason for either novices or experienced FRPers to prefer High Fantasy. If it were professionally edited and extensively rewritten to make parts more clear to those with no knowledge of FRP, High Fantasy would be a decent, though not outstanding, introductory game. As it is, if Reston [Publishing] continues to show such disregard for basic production quality in its other game publications [...] then the hobby will suffer for it."

In the December 1982 edition of Dragon (Issue #68), Robert Plamondon thought the concept of solo adventures introduced in the second edition of the game "works very well indeed." He concluded, "I was impressed by all the High Fantasy solos, and have played each of them more than once (with wildly different results each time). They show that an 'interactive novel' approach to solo adventures is more than workable — it’s the best way to write them. With luck, these will be just the tip of the iceberg.

In his 1990 book The Complete Guide to Role-Playing Games, game critic Rick Swan warned readers "Don't go out of your way [to find it]. Although the game has noble intentions as a simpler alternative to D&D, High Fantasy is dismal — hopelessly derivative, awkwardly written, and virtually unplayable." Swan concluded by giving the game a very poor rating of 1.5 out of 4, saying, "Oddly enough the book concludes with one of the best solitaire adventures I've ever seen — a clever, challenging scenario that rivals the best of the Tunnels & Trolls solos. Fortunately it can be adapted to other fantasy systems without too much trouble."

In his 1991 book Heroic Worlds: A History and Guide to Role-Playing Games, Lawrence Schick thought the system had "unremarkable rules" but was "notable for the high quality of its scenarios".

== Other reviews and commentary ==
- Gryphon (Issue 1, Summer 1980)
- Gryphon (Issue 3, Spring 1981)
