= Wizards & Warriors =

1987 video game

- North American box art
- Developer: Rare
- Publishers: NA/EU: Acclaim Entertainment; JP: Jaleco
- Directors: Tim Stamper; Chris Stamper
- Producers: Tim Stamper; Joel Hochberg
- Designers: Tim Stamper; Chris Stamper; Paul Proctor; Mark Betteridge
- Programmers: Paul Proctor; Mark Betteridge
- Artists: Tim Stamper; Rachel Edwards
- Composer: David Wise
- Series: Wizards & Warriors
- Platform: Nintendo Entertainment System
- Release: NA: December 1987; JP: 15 July 1988; EU: 7 January 1990
- Genres: Action, platform
- Mode: Single-player

Wizards & Warriors, titled Densetsu no Kishi Elrond (伝説の騎士 エルロンド, Legendary Knight: Elrond) in Japan, is an action platform video game developed by Rare and published by Acclaim Entertainment for the Nintendo Entertainment System. It was released in North America in December 1987, in Japan on 15 July 1988, and in Europe on 7 January 1990. The player controls Kuros, "Knight Warrior of the Books of Excalibur", as he sets out in the Kingdom of Elrond to defeat the evil wizard Malkil. Malkil holds the princess of Elrond captive in Castle IronSpire, deep within the forests of Elrond. The player fights through forests, tunnels, and caves, while collecting keys, treasure, weapons, and magic items.

It is Acclaim's first game as the domestic publisher, and Rare's second NES game, after Slalom (1987). In the months surrounding its North American and European releases, Wizards & Warriors was featured in several video game magazines, including Nintendo Fun Club News, Nintendo Power, and VideoGames & Computer Entertainment. It was praised for its graphics, sound, difficulty, and arcade-style gameplay. In 2010, Retro Gamer called it "a unique experience for NES gamers in 1987" that was "technically well ahead of other games for the console at the time", but attributed its relatively low difficulty to allowing unlimited continues without penalty. Wizards & Warriors was followed by three sequels: Ironsword: Wizards & Warriors II (1989), Wizards & Warriors X: The Fortress of Fear (1990), and Wizards & Warriors III: Kuros: Visions of Power (1992).

== Gameplay ==
Wizards & Warriors is a platform game in which players control Kuros through the forests of Elrond to Castle IronSpire, where he must defeat Malkil and rescue the princess. Starting in the Elrond forest, players explore the trees to find items and to reach the caves and tunnels. There, various magical items and treasure are collected, and then caves filled with ice and lava are explored. Players fight through a second set of forests, and arrive at Castle IronSpire. It consists of a series of mazes in which players must use keys to open doors and possibly rescue other damsels. At the end lies the final confrontation with the wizard Malkil.

Kuros is about to obtain the red key, to open the red treasure chest below.

Players use the control pad to move horizontally and to crouch. Kuros can attack enemies by using his Brightsword or with other weapons and magic. He can attack enemies while in the air or while standing by holding the sword in position. The objective of the game is to collect the various weapons, magic, gems, and treasure to overcome the enemies and other obstacles and hazards. Gems are required to bribe the creature who guards the entrance to the next level. At the end of each level is a boss creature that has been empowered by Malkil's black magic. Bosses have an "Enemy's Black Magic Power" meter that shows how difficult the boss is, how many hits are required to defeat it, and what type of weaponry needs to be used. Kuros has a life meter that decreases as time passes and when he sustains damage from enemies. Players loses a life when Kuros's life meter runs out, but keep all items. The game ends when all three lives have been lost, but may continue; upon continuing, all items remain, but the score is reset to zero. Kuros's life meter is replenished by collecting pieces of meat scattered throughout the levels.

Helpful items are inside acorns, torches, and treasure chests. Chests and doors are color-coded and require a key of matching color. Some weapons and magic items are replaced upon collecting a new item. Items include the following: "Boots of Force" that can kick open chests and doors; magical potions that temporarily grant Kuros invulnerability, extra speed, or extra jumping ability; gems to help bribe the end-of-level guardian; a shield to protect from enemy attacks; the "Potion of Levitation" that allows Kuros to float upward; the "Dagger of Throwing" and the "Battle Axe of Agor" that are thrown at enemies and return like a boomerang; the "Feather of Feather Fall" that slows Kuros's falling speed; the "Wand of Wonder" and "Staff of Power" that shoot out balls of ice and fire, respectively; the "Cloak of Darkness" that makes Kuros invisible to enemies; the "Boots of Lava Walk" that allows Kuros to walk on the lava; "Exploding Eggs" that destroys all on-screen enemies; "Alarm Clocks" that stop all enemies for a brief period; knife and axe upgrades; and a "horn" (trumpet) to reveal hidden doors to gem caves. Score increases include coins, orbs, chalices, entire hoards of treasure, and rescuing the damsels.

== Plot ==
Wizards & Warriors pits the hero Kuros, the "Knight Warrior of the Books of Excalibur", against the main antagonist, the evil wizard Malkil. He was considered one of the greatest wizards in the land, such that Merlin was one of his students. However, the aging Malkil has gone mad, using his magic for evil, and has captured the princess as prisoner in Castle IronSpire, deep within the forests of Elrond. The brave knight Kuros, is summoned to venture through the forests of Elrond. He is armed with the legendary Brightsword, a sword that is powerful enough to beat demons, insects, undead, and the other creatures under Malkil's spell. With the sword, he ventures out through the forests of Elrond and the various caves and tunnels and to Castle IronSpire, to defeat Malkil and rescue the princess.

== Development ==
Wizards & Warriors was developed by the UK-based Rare for the Nintendo Entertainment System. It was released by Acclaim Entertainment in North America in December 1987; and in Europe on 7 January 1990. It was released in Japan by Jaleco with the title Densetsu no Kishi Elrond (伝説の騎士 エルロンド, Legendary Knight: Elrond) on 15 July 1988. Wizards & Warriors was Acclaim's first game as the domestic publisher; Acclaim's previous releases were all localizations of games originally released by other companies. It is Rare's second NES release, after Slalom. The soundtrack was composed by video game composer David Wise.

== Reception ==
Reception

Review scores
| Publication | Score |
|---|---|
| AllGame | 4.5/5 |
| The Games Machine | 70% |
| Power Play | 68% |
| GameSpot | 7.2/10 |

In North America, the game sold 750,000 copies.

Wizards & Warriors was reviewed in Nintendo Fun Club News, the precursor to Nintendo Power. Nintendo Power called it the best game for the NES Advantage controller, allowing concentration on strategic gameplay. In 1989, it nominated the game for "Best Graphics & Sound" and Kuros for "Best Character" in its "Nintendo Power Awards '88", but it did not win in either category. VideoGames & Computer Entertainment lauded the game's challenge, the need for problem solving to use various items to defeat some enemies and make progress, the need to find hidden rooms for items, the high difficulty being offset by continues, the "excellent graphics and sound", and the arcade-style gameplay. Power Play praised the graphics, sound, and extras, but criticized its "stale gameplay".

Arnie Katz reviewed the game for Computer Gaming World, stating that "Wizards & Warriors refutes the claim that all video games are unrestrained target shoots. This engaging and well-programmed action quest offers a satisfying, well-rounded gaming experience."

In a retrospective of the entire Wizards & Warriors series, UK-based magazine Retro Gamer gave a positive review of the first game, saying that "Kuros's first adventure was a unique experience for NES gamers in 1987, and technically well ahead of other games for the console at the time." The review said that the platform game emphasizes hunting treasure and items, and that most gamers disliked the relatively easy difficulty level due to unlimited continues. According to the retrospective, in 1988, Rare showed Wizards & Warriors to Zippo Games, who was touring Rare and its NES library. Rare asked Zippo to develop a sequel, which became Ironsword: Wizards & Warriors II. In another retrospective at Rare's 25th anniversary, GamePro called the game "unique at the time" due to unlimited continues.

Wizards & Warriors has received scant coverage from modern video gaming websites. GamesRadar named the opening theme "Game music of the day", noting that the theme "suggests, from the moment you turn on the game, that knights, wizards, goblins and who knows what else are about to collide in a battle so epic it's destined for a Frazetta painting". JC Fletcher from Joystiq called the game "a simple action-platformer about a guy in thick armor who kicks open treasure chests in order to bribe knights". He notes the variety of good and bad items such as the "Staff of Power" which inflicts much damage to enemies and conversely the "Cloak of Darkness", which he says "makes Kuros invisible to you but not to enemies". He said that the game has an arcade feel, with unlimited continues, a high-score list, name entry for high scores, and good music. Houston Press's Jef Rouner lauded the game's music and animation, and noted its high difficulty level, especially during boss battles. IGN put Wizards & Warriors at #56 on its "Top 100 NES Games" list, and reviewer Sam Claiborn said that the game was inspired by Dungeons & Dragons style of RPGs, and added action platforming elements. Seanbaby criticized the game for items that did not work as intended, including the "Cloak of Darkness" and the "Boots of Lava Walk".

== Other media ==
Wizards & Warriors was published as a standalone handheld game by Acclaim in September 1989, in a series of handheld ports including WWF WrestleMania Challenge, Knight Rider, 1943: The Battle of Midway, and Rocky. Kuros and Malkil were featured – along with the title characters from Kwirk and BigFoot, Tyrone from Arch Rivals, and characters from NARC – in the 1990 animated series The Power Team, part of the video game reviewing show Video Power. Malkil is in an episode of Captain N: The Game Master called "Nightmare on Mother Brain's Street" where the game world is referred to as Excalibur and not Elrond.

Wizards & Warriors is one of the eight NES games novelized for the Worlds of Power series, written by children's book author Ellen Miles (series' creator Seth Godin is also credited under the pseudonym "F. X. Nine").
