= Fantavision (video game) =

2000 video game

- North American cover art
- Developers: Sony Computer Entertainment Japan; Cosmo Machia (202X)
- Publishers: Sony Computer Entertainment; Cosmo Machia (202X)
- Director: Katsuyuki Kanetaka
- Designers: Shigeru Kurihara; Katsuyuki Kanetaka
- Programmers: Toshio Fukui; Akihiro Taguchi; Toshitake Tsuchikura; Nobukazu Ohta
- Composers: JP: Soichi Terada; NA: Ashif Hakik; PAL: Jim Croft
- Engine: Unreal Engine 4 (202X)
- Platforms: PlayStation 2, mobile phone, PlayStation 5 (202X), Microsoft Windows (202X)
- Release: March 9, 2000: PlayStation 2; JP: March 9, 2000; NA: October 26, 2000; EU: November 24, 2000; AUS/NZ: November 26, 2000; JP: July 4, 2002 (Futari no Fantavision) Mobile phone; JP: July 16, 2003 (J-Sky); JP: July 3, 2008 (EZweb) PlayStation 5 (202X); WW: February 22, 2023 Windows (202X); WW: April 27, 2023
- Genre: Puzzle
- Modes: Single-player, multiplayer

Fantavision, (Note: Japanese: ファンタビジョン, Hepburn: Fantabijon) sometimes stylized as FantaVision, is a 2000 puzzle video game developed and published by Sony Computer Entertainment for the PlayStation 2. The game's objective is to use a cursor to select three or more launched fireworks (called "flares") of the same color in a row and then to detonate them to increase the player's score. Used in conjunction with various power-ups, the resulting explosions can ignite and chain together even more flares for additional points.

Fantavision was created during Sony's transition from its original PlayStation (PS1) to its next generation console. The game was initially conceived by director Katsuyuki Kanetaka, inspired by the fireworks shows he witnessed in his youth. After successfully pitching the project to Sony, Fantavision was supervised by the company's first-party development head Shuhei Yoshida and was completed by a small team in a short time frame. The graphics emphasize the PS2's ability to show particle effects.

Fantavision was released in Japan on March 9, 2000, a few days after the PS2 itself. It was released the same day as the console in North America, Europe, Australia, and New Zealand later that year with an added two-player mode. An updated version with this mode titled Futari no Fantavision (Note: ふたりのファンタビジョン, Futari no Fantabijon; lit. "Fantavision for Two") was released in Japan in 2002, featuring revised cutscenes and design. Fantavision was then remade for Japanese mobile phones starting in 2003. Finally, the game was digitally re-released on Sony's newer consoles via the PlayStation Network outside of Japan beginning in 2015. The game received a mostly above-average critical response with reviewers generally praising its visual presentation, core gameplay, and multiplayer. However, many found fault with the length and replay value of its single-player experience when compared to contemporary titles in the puzzle genre.

A remake based on Futari no Fantavision, Fantavision 202X, was released on the PlayStation 5 and Windows.

== Gameplay ==
Fantavision is a real-time puzzle game that relies on quick color matching and symbol recognition skills from the player. The game consists of a series of stages set in darkened, 3D environments where brightly colored fireworks called '"flares" are launched onto the screen and will hover for a period of time before disappearing. Using the DualShock 2's left analog stick, the player controls the direction of a guideline ray extending from a circular cursor that allows a flare along the ray to be "captured" with the controller's X button. The goal is to string together three or more flares of the same color and then detonate them by pressing the circle button, thus increasing the player's score. Different types of flares can be encountered including "peonies", which explode in a circular fashion; "willows", which have sparks that descend downward in dome shape; and "multiflares", which break apart into smaller pieces that can be detonated a second time. More points can be obtained with chain reactions caused by new flares touching the sparks of detonated flares of the same color. This creates a "daisy chain" that allows flares of multiple colors to be detonated simultaneously. Flashing flares called "wilds" can also be used to directly chain together flares of different colors. Flares not detonated before they disappear are considered "missed" and cause a "Play Meter" at the bottom of the screen to decrease. If flares are continuously captured and detonated for a specific period of time while keeping this meter from depleting, the player eventually advances to the next stage. If the Play Meter fully empties, the game ends.

Gameplay consists of detonating captured flares. The player's score and flare chain are displayed on the top left while the collected Starmine letters and Play Meter are on the bottom left.

Power-ups periodically appear and can be captured and detonated along with an existing set of three or more normal flares. These include power-ups that can award extra points or refill the Play Meter. Another power-up appears in the form of a white star and for each one captured, the player earns a letter of the word "Starmine". After collecting all eight letters, a large glowing Starmine flare is launched onto the screen. If the player captures it and detonates it with at least three colored flares, a time-limited bonus stage is entered where a large number of fireworks appear at a rapid pace. The more flares initially detonated along with the Starmine, the longer the bonus mode lasts.

Fantavision offers eight stages on a single-player playthrough as well as extra unlockable challenges such as a hard Difficulty. The game also has a split-screen versus mode where two players compete in a race to detonate a preset total of flares. In this mode, there are additional power-ups which can either increase the size of the play area (while decreasing that of the opponent) or swap both the play areas and undetonated fireworks of the two competitors. By using these mechanisms, it is possible to steal flares intended for the opponent's side of the screen, including during an opponent's Starmine bonus. Finally, a replay feature allows the player to rewatch recorded levels with different camera angles while adding in weather effects, psychedelic lighting patterns, and time delays between seeing and hearing firework detonations for an added sense of realism.

== Development ==
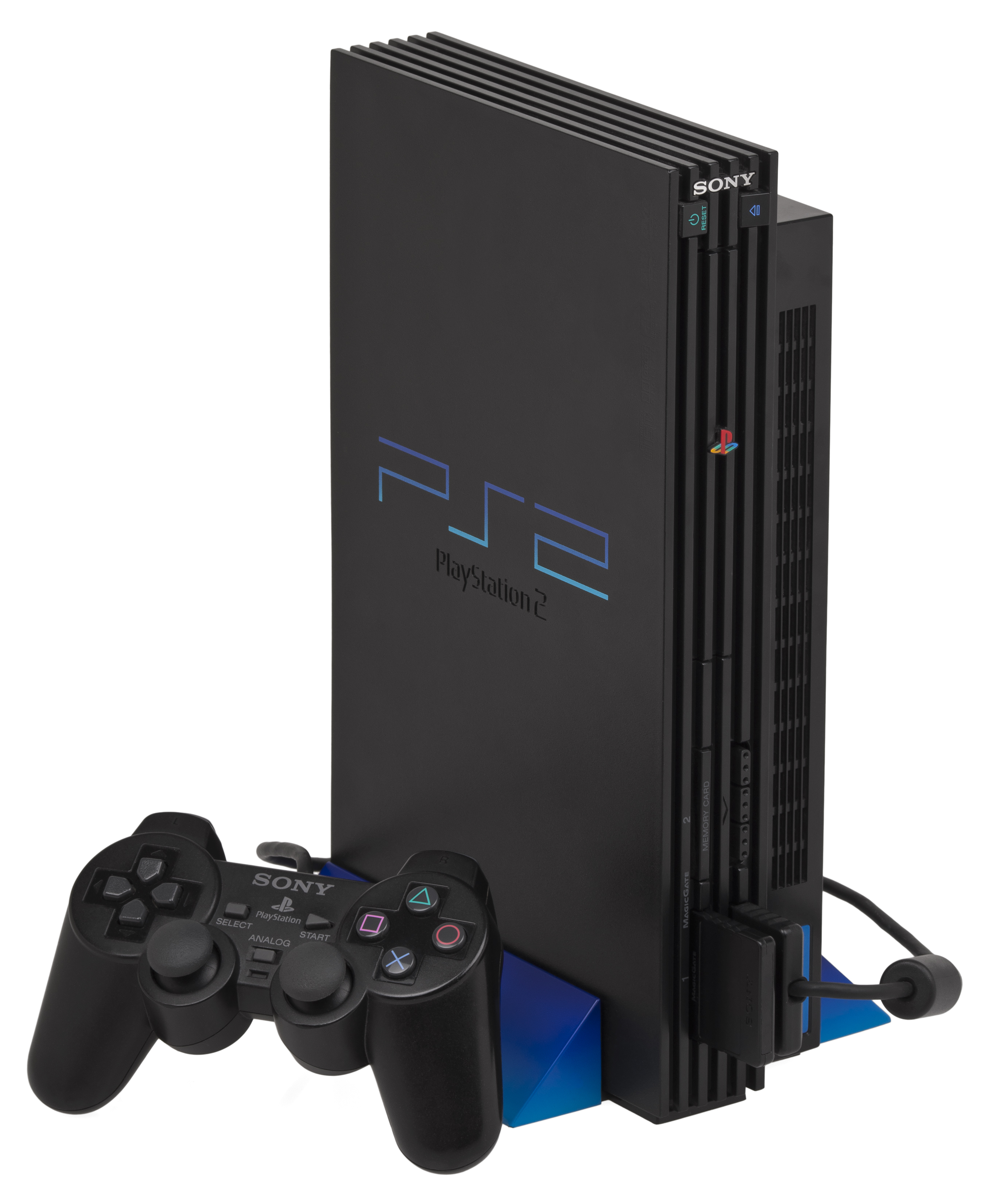
Fantavision was the first internally-developed Sony game for its PlayStation 2 console (pictured).

Fantavision was developed by Sony Computer Entertainment Japan during the transition period to the corporation's next generation console, the PS2. After completing Ape Escape for the PS1, Fantavision was one of a handful of projects supervised by former head of Japan Studio Shuhei Yoshida before he left Japan to become vice president of product development at Sony's North American division. Yoshida recalled that the game was essentially created by a team of just three to five people in a mere six months time.

Fantavision was director Katsuyuki Kanetaka's first game project, the concept for which he had devised around 1995. He stated that he was inspired by the fireworks shows he saw at Lake Biwa in his youth. Kanetaka admitted to having no experience programming, but prototyped Fantavision on the computer application Klik & Play and refined the idea through much trial and error. With the PS1 technically incapable of displaying the sheer number of desired visual effects on-screen simultaneously, the director felt the impending release of the PS2 was the right time to pitch the game. After witnessing more fireworks demonstrations for research, the game's creators were still not initially confident they could replicate the more complex portions of the shows as no technological precedent existed. Ultimately, Fantavision was marketed to showcase the PS2's ability to provide particle effects through its graphics accelerator and trademark Emotion Engine. All the pyrotechnics displayed are individually rendered as 3D polygons. Despite this, Yoshida claimed that both he and his team were "ridiculed" within the company for working on a seemingly small-scale puzzle game during Sony's move to newer hardware.

Fantavision was announced in late 1999 as part of the initial lineup of PS2 software. It was the only game developed internally by Sony to accompany the PS2's debut. Yoshida explained that this was because Sony did not want to rush a large number of its products and compete with the slew of high quality, third-party support the console was receiving at the time. Like most of the PS2's early software library, Japanese copies of Fantavision would be manufactured on CD-ROM instead of the system's newer DVD format.

== Release ==
Fantavision was first prominently featured as part of the February 2000 PlayStation Festival at Makuhari Messe in Chiba. Though initially slated to be released alongside the console in Japan on March 4, 2000, Fantavision's release was delayed by five days to March 9. To promote the game during the following months, Fantavision was featured at the Tokyo Game Show in April, at the Electronic Entertainment Expo in Los Angeles in May, at the Tokyo Big Sight as part of the main event of the 21st Century Dream Technology Exhibition from July into August and at Olympia London for the European Computer Trade Show in September.

The game hit store shelves the same day as the PS2 in North America on October 26, 2000: in Europe on November 24, 2000 and in Australia and New Zealand on November 30, 2000. The Western releases of the game added a two-player option. An updated version titled Futari no Fantavision was released in Japan on July 4, 2002, and included a two-player mode and a remixed soundtrack.

Each of the major regional releases of Fantavision features a different music composer and soundtrack. The Japanese version was composed by Soichi Terada, who previously worked on the soundtrack for Sony's Ape Escape. The North American version of Fantavision was composed by Ashif Hakik. Jim Croft composed for the PAL versions. An associate of Croft had a connection with Sony, which informed them that new music was needed because the Japanese score might be perceived as "too weird" for European consumers. The Japanese soundtracks for Fantavision and Futari no Fantavision (also by Terada) were released on March 24, 2000, and August 5, 2002, respectively.

A mobile phone remake of Fantavision was made available for two Japanese mobile phone services: J-Sky on July 16, 2003, and EZweb on July 3, 2008. Outside of Japan, the PS2 version of Fantavision was re-released digitally on Sony's more modern consoles via the PlayStation Network starting on December 22, 2015.

== Reception and legacy ==
Reception

Aggregate score
Aggregator	Score
Metacritic	72/100

Review scores
Publication	Score
AllGame	3/5
CNET Gamecenter	4/10
Edge	8/10
Electronic Gaming Monthly	5/10
Famitsu	31/40 (Fantavision); 30/40 (Futari no Fantavision)
Game Informer	6.75/10
GameFan	78%
GamePro	4/5
GameRevolution	C+
GameSpot	6.6/10
IGN	6.5/10
Next Generation	4/5
Official U.S. PlayStation Magazine	4/5

Overall, Fantavision received a slightly above-average response from critics. It holds a score of 72 out of 100 on the review aggregator Metacritic, corresponding to "mixed or average reviews". Despite largely receiving middling evaluations from the publications, Fantavision won the editor's "Puzzle Game of 2000" at IGN's "Best of 2000 Awards for PlayStation 2" and was a runner-up for the "Best Puzzle Game" of 2000 award for both GameSpot and Official U.S. PlayStation Magazine. During the 4th Annual Interactive Achievement Awards, the Academy of Interactive Arts & Sciences nominated Fantavision for the "Console Innovation" award.

The general presentation of Fantavision has been universally compared to the arcade game Missile Command by Atari. Opinions on the particle effects and environments in Fantavision were largely favorable. The colorful, simulated pyrotechnics enjoyed such descriptions as "mesmerizing", "pretty", "beautiful", "gorgeous", and "jaw-dropping" by various media outlets. Eric Bratcher of Next Generation lauded, "The screen constantly erupts in blossoms of bright, overloaded color and even the backgrounds pack a visual punch as you move from Earth to outer space and beyond." GameSpot writer Mark Davis complimented the backdrops as "teeming with detail" and how the game maintained a consistently high framerate, even during its most intense fireworks displays. He ventured that puzzle games rarely showcase a console's graphical prowess, but that Fantavision was a pleasant exception. AllGame's Jay Semerad equally commended its backgrounds and alleged that the game's lighting effects did well to emphasize the PS2's capabilities. Other reviewers felt the game's graphics were a failure by Sony to strongly represent to power of its newly released PS2 hardware. Aaron Curtiss of the Los Angeles Times stated, "Visually, the game hints at what PlayStation 2 can pump out. But even when the screen is bursting with color, one can’t help but think the machine has yet to break a sweat." IGN's Doug Perry likewise believed that the game could have appeared on any console and been just as graphically impressive. He surmised, "After all of Sony's hoopla about the PS2's phenomenal power, its first PS2 title in the US is the exact antithesis of power or dazzling technology."

Impressions of Fantavision's gameplay mechanics were mostly favorable, though many reviewers found that Fantavision lacked replay value, especially when compared to contemporary puzzle titles. PSM contributor Stephen Frost declared, "Just like a real fireworks show, Fantavision is breathtaking at first but fizzles out quickly." Perry, Frost, Curtiss, and GameRevolution considered Fantavision's long-term replayability inferior to that of releases like Super Puzzle Fighter II Turbo, Tetris DX, Devil Dice, Super Bust-a-Move, and Pokémon Puzzle Challenge. Paul Fitzpatrick of PlayStation Official Magazine – UK inferred that its comprisal of only eight levels (16 counting hard mode) was one of the game's few yet major shortcomings, but nonetheless acknowledged it as "addictive, innovative, and very playable." Edge felt that the power-ups and extra modes of Fantavision successfully extended its seemingly curtailed single-player experience. The magazine declared, "Simple enough, you conclude. Shallow, even. Before you know it, though, hours have passed, yet the 'one more go' factor remains firmly in place." Curtiss and Dudlak both thought the game should have been included as a free pack-in with the PS2 console rather than be released at full retail price. Frost, Fitzpatrick, Perry, IGN's Marc Nix, and Game Informer's Jay Fitzloff all likened Fantavision to a simple technology demonstration. In the years following the game's original release, the notion that the game started as a PS2 technology demonstration prior to becoming a full-fledged game has persisted among numerous media outlets.

The addition of multiplayer to the Western localizations of Fantavision was praised. Hill called this mode "hugely entertaining" while the staff of Edge declared that its inclusion "cements Fantavision's status as an addictive, creative, and excellent title". Perry denoted the two-player mode to be the game's "saving grace" while Davis similarly stated it "breathes a good deal of life into a game that would've otherwise been worthy of a rental at best". Frost concluded that it would be the only way most players would discover a sense of value with the game once its visual charm had worn off. Though he enjoyed the two-player option in Fantavision, Semerad felt it was not as entertaining as similar experiences in other puzzle games possibly due to its "abstract" gameplay.

=== Sales ===
According to Famitsu, Fantavision was the fifth-best selling game in Japan during its week of release at 26,977 copies sold. Media Create reported that the game had sold 165,437 units in Japan by mid-June 2000. Sales quickly tapered off and totalled 173,048 copies in the region by the end of 2000. The commercial performance of Fantavision outside of Japan was poor. It was only the 15th-best selling PS2 title during the console's launch in the United States per data from The NPD Group. GfK Chart-Track reported that the game was the 13th-best selling PS2 title during its release week in the United Kingdom at just 826 copies sold.
