= In the Service of Saena Sephar =

In the Service of Saena Sephar is an adventure published by Reston Publishing in 1982 for the single-player fantasy role-playing game High Fantasy.

== Plot summary ==
In the Service of Saena Sephar is a solo adventure scenario in which the player character needs to search a castle to find and disarm a magical device before the allotted time to do so runs out. The adventure is set on the island of Andriana, currently co-ruled by three chieftains. The player takes on the role of Aleste of Flyes, who learns that one of the co-rulers, Haerne, has set a magical device to explode and kill the two other chieftains; this will allow Haerne to assume total control of the island. The player's mission is to prevent Haerne from taking power, either by disarming the bomb or by other means.

The player starts the adventure at Scene 1. There are 602 more scenes — the choice the player makes at the end of each scene determines the path taken through the book, ultimately leading to success or failure. The adventure can be replayed by the same player, making different choices at various times to see how the adventure then plays out.

== Publication history ==
While attending Indiana University in the mid-1970s, Jeff C. Dillow designed a role-playing game which he later published as High Fantasy. In 1982, Reston Publishing released In the Service of Saena Sephar, a 164-page single-player adventure written by Craig Fisher for the High Fantasy system.

== Reception ==
In the August 1982 edition of The Space Gamer (No. 54), David J. Arlington noted the spoiler on the cover and the relatively high purchase price ($10.95 in 1982), and commented "If you can avoid looking at the cover, and don't mind spending the bucks, this game will provide you with many hours of exciting play."

In the December 1982 edition of Dragon (Issue #68), Robert Plamondon noted that due to all of the possible paths this adventure could take, there were "an amazing number of ways to win or lose." He concluded, "It is tough but fair, and very replayable."
