= Zub =

1986 video game

- Developer: Binary Design
- Publisher: Mastertronic
- Designer: Ste and John Pickford
- Composer: David Whittaker
- Platforms: Amstrad CPC, Commodore 64, ZX Spectrum
- Release: 1986
- Genre: Platform
- Mode: Single-player

Zub is a 1986 platform video game designed by Ste and John Pickford, developed by Binary Design, and published by Mastertronic for the Amstrad CPC, Commodore 64 and ZX Spectrum. The game has the player control Zub, who has to travel to different planets to retrieve the Green Eyeball of Zub. A parody of the game Light Force, called Lightfarce, was added in as an easter egg. The music on all computers was composed by David Whittaker.

The game received positive reviews for the Spectrum and Amstrad versions, with the Commodore version garnering negative reception.

== Plot and gameplay ==
Gameplay

In Zub, Private Zub, is tasked by the King Zub to reclaim the Green Eyeball of Zub from his brother. Private Zub, having never been in combat for 478 years, is promoted to Sergeant and sent off to make his way to planet Zub 10.

Controlling the mission bound Zub, the player must travel through the Zub system, from planets Zub 1 to 10, to retrieve the crown jewel and return it.

== Development ==
Zub was developed by Ste and John Pickford. It was originally titled Zob but was changed due to it being a slang term in French. It was released for the Amstrad CPC, Commodore 64 and ZX Spectrum computers under Mastertronic's M.A.D (Mastertronic's Added Dimension) imprint. David Whittaker composed the music for the game. The inclusion of the Lightfarce came from the brothers frustrations with the positive press Light Force was receiving. It took the brothers two and a half day to create the game. Believing it to be unreleaseable, it was included in Zub at the end of its development cycle as an easter egg.

Originally meant to be a twelve week project, the game ended up taking sixteen to twenty weeks to complete. Due to delay, Mastertronic released the game compatible with the ZX Spectrum 48K, lacking in features such as animated sequences. Mastertronic later released a 128K version and offered customers who bought the 48K a free copy of the enhanced version.

== Reception ==
Reception

Review scores
Publication	Score
Amstrad Action	76%
Amtix	88%
Crash	79%
Sinclair User	5/5
Your Sinclair	7/10
Zzap!64	38%
Commodore User	3/10

Zub received generally positive reviews for the ZX Spectrum and Amstrad computers. Bob Wade for Amstrad Action gave praise for its presentation and graphics but thought it lacked in variety. Reviewers for Amtix! called it one of the better budget titles for the Amstrad. Graham Taylor for Sinclair User declared it to be a "vital purchase". Your Sinclair's Marcus Berkmann singled out the game's use of humour and considered it the type of game a budget title should be.

The Commodore 64 version was negatively received. Zzap!64 described the game as "a glamorous but tedious clone of Frogger. Richard Bradbury from Commodore User criticized its sound effects and over called it "a rather weak and repetitive game" that had little or no appeal.

The Pickford brothers, while not having actual sales information, estimated that the Spectrum and Commodore versions both sold 60,000 copies while the Amstrad sold 50,000. The brothers considered the game to be released in an unfinished state.
