= Fortress Ellendar =

- Publishers: Fantasy Productions, Inc.
- Publication: 1979
- Genres: Role-playing
- Parent games: High Fantasy

Fortress Ellendar is a 1979 fantasy role-playing game adventure published by Fantasy Productions, Inc. for the High Fantasy role-playing game.

== Plot summary ==
Fortress Ellendar is an adventure in which the player characters must reclaim Fortress Ellendar from the evil lord that has taken it over.

Fortress Ellendar is an adventure scenario in which the characters must reclaim an eight-level fortress in the desert from the demon that conquered it.

== Publication history ==
Fortress Ellendar was written by Jeffrey C. Dillow and published by Fantasy Productions in 1979 as a 16-page book with two maps.

== Reception ==
Don Turnbull reviewed Fortress Ellendar for White Dwarf #19 (June/July 1980), giving it an overall score of 7 out of 10. He commented that "the booklet is attractive and well-presented; the adventure is fully documented and there is a flow to the text which is not notably present in, for instance, many of the Judges Guild 'modules'. Apparently this is merely the first of about half a dozen such adventure modules, and if the others are as good as this one, they should be worth getting even if you don't intend to play the High Fantasy rules."

Ronald Pehr reviewed Fortress Ellendar in The Space Gamer No. 30. Pehr commented that "The good outweighs the bad, though. Fortress Ellendar is a worthwhile adventure."

Anders Swenson reviewed Fortress Ellendar and Moorguard for Different Worlds magazine and stated that "With a copy of High Fantasy in hand, it is easy to transliterate the monster notation to correspond to most of the major game systems, and these books are both very good examples of the narrative style of scenario, which many GMs may wish to examine to upgrade their own campaigns."
