= Wizards & Warriors III: Kuros: Visions of Power =

1992 video game

Wizards & Warriors III: Kuros - Visions of Power
- North American cover art
- Developers: Zippo Games; Rare
- Publisher: Acclaim Entertainment
- Director: Ste and John Pickford
- Producer: Tim Stamper
- Programmers: Ste and John Pickford; Steve Hughes; Andy Miah
- Artists: Ste Pickford; Lyndon Brooke
- Composer: David Wise
- Platform: Nintendo Entertainment System
- Release: NA: March 1992; EU: January 21, 1993
- Genres: Action-adventure, platformer
- Mode: Single-player

Wizards & Warriors III: Kuros – Visions of Power is a platforming and adventure video game for the Nintendo Entertainment System (NES). It was developed by UK-based company Zippo Games for Rare; it was published by Acclaim Entertainment and released in North America in March 1992. It is the third and final installment in the Wizards & Warriors series and is the sequel to the 1989 title Ironsword: Wizards & Warriors II; it also follows the 1990 Game Boy release Wizards & Warriors X: The Fortress of Fear.

The game picks up immediately from the events at the end of Ironsword where the knight warrior Kuros had just defeated the evil wizard Malkil from the peak of IceFire Mountain. Unaware that Malkil's spirit is still intact, Kuros gets struck by a bolt of magic from the spirit, causing him to lose his armor, memory, and honor. Malkil then flees to the city of Piedup and seizes the throne from Good King James. Meanwhile, Kuros, after wandering for months in the wilderness without weapons, armor, or food, arrives at the city of Piedup, where he must build strength and utilize various disguises and abilities in order to take on Malkil. The game is nonlinear and requires players to explore various areas to pick up items and gain abilities to unlock different parts of the city in order to progress.

Wizards & Warriors III was developed by Zippo Games' founders Ste and John Pickford, who also had a few additional programmers and artists to assist them. The Pickford brothers designed the game as a homage to Ultimate Play the Game's (Rare's former incarnation) 1983 ZX Spectrum title Atic Atac; they also drew inspiration for gameplay and art from other NES titles such as Metroid, Faxanadu, and Super Mario Bros. 3. The game had moderate sales, though not as good as its predecessor Ironsword. It was praised for its bold graphics, expansive gameplay, and challenge. However, it was mostly criticized for its controls, lack of fighting, and the lack of continues or passwords. While the game received mixed reviews, Ste Pickford said that this game was his personal favorite. Zippo Games, which was acquired by Rare and was known as Rare Manchester during development, shut down shortly before this game's completion, and while the game hinted at another sequel, it has never occurred.

== Gameplay ==
Kuros exploring the underground depths

Wizards & Warriors III is a platforming video game which features open-ended gameplay elements similar to games such as Metroid and Faxanadu. Players control the main character Kuros as he sets out to defeat Malkil and free the town of Piedup. The game features three separate realms in which the player must explore - the town, the underworld, and the palace; players can freely navigate from one realm to another. Throughout the game, players find money which can be used to buy items from inns located throughout Piedup; players can buy keys for unlocking doors, food and drink for restoring health, and information from shopkeepers. Players begin the game with three lives, and the game ends when all lives have been lost; unlike the previous Wizards & Warriors games, there is no password or continue feature.

Kuros' first objective is to gain new disguises, powers, and abilities from the three main character classes: knight, thief, and wizard. In order to do that, Kuros must first collect bronze, silver, and gold statues of each character class and return each statue to its corresponding "guild". Upon returning a statue to a guild, Kuros must pass a test - in the form of a horizontal or vertical-scrolling level with a boss to defeat at the end - from the person who runs the guild. After defeating the boss, Kuros is then outfitted with a new attire and ability. Each character class has three levels, and each corresponds to a specific statue which must be returned to a specific guild. For example, if Kuros find the bronze thief statue, he must return it to the first level of the thief's guild; if Kuros passes the test, he then receives the disguise and ability of a "level one thief". At the levels of the guild increase, the more difficult the tests become. Each new ability allows players to access new areas which would normally be unreachable with other character classes and abilities. New abilities include improved weaponry for the knight, greater magic for the wizard, and increased access to buildings through doors and windows for the thief.

Another objective to finding and defeating Malkil in Wizards & Warriors III is to find four secret gems which will unlock the hidden passage through the town of Piedup to the castle's throne room where the evil wizard is located. To do this, Kuros must rescue King James' three princesses who are hidden somewhere in Piedup; each of them will grant Kuros a gem and agree to marry him when rescued. The final gem is obtained by defeating a dragon in the town's underworld.

== Plot ==
Wizards & Warriors III: Kuros: Visions of Power takes place immediately after the events at the end of the previous game, Ironsword: Wizards & Warriors II, when Kuros has defeated his nemesis, the evil wizard Malkil, on the peak of IceFire Mountain. Unaware that Malkil's spirit has survived, Kuros is struck by a bolt of magic from the spirit, knocking him out and removing his armor, memory, and honor. A weakened Malkil then flees and takes refuge in the peaceful city of Piedup, where he dethrones Good King James and takes control of the city. Meanwhile, Kuros has been left to wander in the wilderness without any weapons, armor, or food. After wandering for several months, he finally reaches the city of Piedup, where Malkil's spirit lies. While in the city, Kuros assumes several disguises of wizard, knight, and thief, in order to travel through town undetected and build strength and skill, rescue damsels, and prepare for his battle with Malkil.

Eventually, Kuros makes his way to the throne room in the castle of Piedup. After freeing Good King James, Kuros encounters Malkil, who offers his partnership to Kuros, saying that they would only destroy each other and that they could rule the world if they joined. Players are then given the option of choosing "yes" or "no". If the player chooses "yes", Malkil then shoots Kuros in the back with magic and instantly defeats him while saying: "Ha! Ha! Ha! The Fool!!" Malkil then holds Kuros prisoner, and the game ends. If the player chooses "no", then the final battle commences; after Kuros defeats Malkil, Kuros is then sucked into a time portal, sending him into the future. The game then concludes, saying that Kuros has restored the city of Piedup to its former self, that the damsels have been saved, and that Good King James has taken back his throne; Kuros' legend is then immortalized among the people, as his saga "unfurls like a glorious banner". The game concludes by saying that, while Malkil will return, Kuros will be there to defeat him repeatedly, and according to the game, "the light shall reign until the end of time". The game's ending sets the stage for a sequel, but no sequel for the game was ever released.

== Development ==
Development of Wizards & Warriors III: Kuros: Visions of Power started in 1990, when, after strong sales with Ironsword: Wizards & Warriors II, Rare gave Zippo Games the rights to develop and direct the third installment in the series; the company's founders, Ste and John Pickford, co-designed the game. Ste Pickford was the lead artist and designed all the concept art for the game, while Lyndon Brooke also assisted with some of the drawings, and Steve Hughes and Andy Miah wrote the software. The game was originally titled Silversword, which was the name of the development project. The Pickford brothers came up with the concept of Kuros' disguises of knight, wizard, and thief as an homage to Ultimate Play the Game's (Rare's former incarnation) 1983 ZX Spectrum title Atic Atac. Ste Pickford said that designing a game which consisted of multiple characters, guilds, and secrets "was a dream come true at the time", saying that they wanted to pay tribute to the various Ultimate Play the Game titles they played in the early 1980s. Pickford wanted to design a game that was a step forward from most Action RPGs for the NES; he opted for nonlinear gameplay in which the different disguises and accompanying abilities would allow the player to access new areas of the map. "Wizards & Warriors III was more like a game that I really wanted to make." Pickford said.

As with Zippo Games' previous projects, the concept art was drawn on paper. The graphics were then drawn with Deluxe Paint and then translated into the ROM manually, sprite-by-sprite, as the NES hardware required precision in sprite placements; this was different from what Rare did, which was to place each pixel of the graphics sprites on graph paper with marker pens and then tasked people to type the code into the ROM. Ste Pickford said that while Rare's sprite-drawing method was easier, his method, while time-consuming, was more efficient. Most everything from the previous Wizards & Warriors games were removed, except for the main protagonist, Kuros, and the game's main antagonist, Malkil. The concept art was originally drawn in black and white, even though the games were being designed in color, to save money from photocopying or printing in color - both of which were very expensive at the time. In developing the "Demon" mini-boss, Pickford could only use about three animation frames, as the sprite was large for the NES hardware. Pickford designed the "Worm" boss similar to the bosses found in R-Type, where a series of smaller sprites formed a snake or worm-like enemy; however, he commented that "it ended up in the game more like a giant floating head". Pickford drew inspiration from the thrones in Super Mario Bros. 3 in designing the final boss, Malkil.

However, near the end of development, time constraints led the Pickford brothers to sell Zippo Games to Rare, in which Zippo was renamed Rare Manchester. With Rare as their boss, morale dropped for the development staff, and eventually everyone left the company before the game could be completed, thus shutting Rare Manchester down. According to Ste Pickford: "One of the programmers completed the game himself after the studio closed." Pickford included a cover, which consisted of a knight in a light-blue armor, in which he said "was just something I drew for fun". However, when the final version of the game was sent to Rare for approval after the studio's closing, they threw away the cover and added their own. According to Pickford, "The document came back with about two typos fixed, a new cover, and 'revised by Tim Stamper' in big letters on the title page, with all trace of myself or any of the Zippo Games names removed, so I guess Tim had a major role." The game was published by Acclaim Entertainment and released in North America in March 1992 and in Europe on January 21, 1993.

The Pickford brothers included a couple of easter egg references. One of them revolved around the name of one of the tavern keepers, Newton N. Ridley, which is a play off the brewery Newton and Ridley from the British soap opera Coronation Street. Another easter egg reference was made to Dragon Warrior with regards to the princesses Kuros must save during the game. Upon saving a princess, she asks Kuros to marry her, prompting a yes/no response for the player; if the player selects "no", the princess responds with "If you refuse, my heart will surely break!" and prompts the yes/no response again - similar to the "but thou must" response in Dragon Warrior. In addition, as all three princesses will have committed to marrying all three forms of Kuros, the original plan for the game's ending was for the three princesses to come together and see their heroes whom they were going to marry, only to find out all three princesses promised to marry the same person. To rectify the situation, Pickford called for what he referred to as "the ultimate cheapo cop-out", where a UFO abducts Kuros with a teleport beam, sending him into the future and setting the stage for the next sequel which would have been called Lasersword. However, this never came to be.

== Reception ==
Reception

Review scores
Publication	Score
Electronic Gaming Monthly	7/10, 8/10, 5/10, 5/10
Total!	76%

Wizards & Warriors III received preview coverage in the November 1991 issue of Nintendo Power. There, the magazine praised the graphics as being "eye-grabbers", saying that "Rare has a knack for bold, colorful graphics". They also lauded the game's expansiveness and challenge. However, a couple months later, they announced that the game's release was delayed.

Wizards & Warriors III: Kuros: Visions of Power sold 300,000 copies in North America and 30,000 copies in Europe, according to company figures. It was also one of the featured reviews in the February 1992 issue of GamePro magazine. There, reviewer "Slasher Quan" compared the controls to the previous Wizards & Warriors titles, saying that Kuros "is hard-to-control in certain instances, but it's still razor sharp". His criticisms of the game included frustrating item-tracking due to the game's nonlinear structure, lack of fighting, and the lack of continues or passwords; he added that, with regard to the lack of continues or passwords, that "this is particularly a shame because Acclaim reports this baby's about twice as long as Ironsword". Overall, he said that Wizards & Warriors III was "slightly blurry compared to its predecessors".

In a retrospective review of the game in 2008, Destructoid's Conrad Zimmerman criticized Wizards & Warriors III for many issues. While he initially praised the game for its depth, he criticized the game by comparing Kuros to the previous games in the series, saying that he is "still a good-looking knight with a useless sword which he holds as if it were his manhood when jumping" and adding that he "is still one of the most inept fighters in videogame history". He also criticizes the game for its lack of action and fighting, saying that it is "more of a platforming game with the occasional boss fight". Other criticisms include slow and unresponsive controls and hard-to-defeat bosses. Overall, he says that Wizards & Warriors III "isn't a bad game, just one that has some great ideas hampered by serious flaws".

Wizards & Warriors III received praise from Retro Gamer magazine in September 2010, as part of its retrospective on the Wizards & Warriors series. They said that the third installment was the best game in the series as well as developer Ste Pickford's personal favorite, despite the fact that it did not sell as well as its predecessor Ironsword. Developer Ste Pickford said: "Wizards & Warriors III was more like a game that I really wanted to make. IronSword was pretty much a straight sequel for a game dropped in our lap; we look at it and tried to make a new version with some improvements." Pickford added that, while he could have done better with both Ironsword and Wizards & Warriors III, he wished he would have been able to see the latter to its completion.

While Wizards & Warriors III hinted at a sequel at the end of the game, it has not happened. The publishing rights for the series remained with Acclaim, who went bankrupt in 2004, with their intellectual property rights going to Throwback Entertainment. As of late 2010, the Toronto-based company has no plans for any future games in the series.
