= 180 (video game) =

1986 video game

- Publisher: Mastertronic
- Artists: Jeremy Nelson; Ste Pickford
- Composer: David Whittaker
- Platforms: Amiga, Amstrad CPC, Atari 8-bit, Commodore 64, MSX, ZX Spectrum
- Release: 1986: Atari 8-bit, Spectrum, CPC, C64; 1987: MSX; 1988: Amiga
- Genre: Sports
- Modes: Single-player, multiplayer

180 is a darts video game released for the ZX Spectrum, Commodore 64, Amstrad CPC, and Atari 8-bit computers in 1986 and MSX in 1987. It was later converted to the Commodore Amiga and published under the title World Darts.

== Gameplay ==
The player competes in 501 darts against other darts players waiting in a championship tournament with normal darts rules applying, subtracting your score from 501 to zero whilst finishing on a double. Beginning at the quarter-finals, the player must win a best of three match to advance through the tournament. Win another match in the semi-final stage to advance to the final and face the World Champion Jammy Jim. In the final match however, the player needs to win just one leg against him to win the tournament. Players can also compete against another human player or play Round the Clock, throwing darts around the dartboard from 20 to 1 within a time limit.

=== Opponents ===
ZX Spectrum screenshot

There are a total of eight computer-controlled opponents in the game. Before the start of the match, the computer randomly selects an opponent, though Jammy Jim can only be played in the final. The opponents are Del Boy Desmond Sure Shot Sidney, Devious Dave, Limp Wrist Larry, Beer Belly Bill, Mega Mick, Tactical Tel, and Jammy Jim.

== Reception ==
Reception

Award
Publication	Award
Your Sinclair	Megagame

At the time of its release, ratings for the game were favourable. The Spectrum version got a 72% rating from Crash magazine who labelled it as "the best darts game ever". The Commodore 64 version received a 70% rating from ZZAP! magazine. The Amstrad version got a rating of 67% from Amstrad Action.

The game was reviewed in Sinclair User, which rated the game 5 out of 5, stating "Darts ought to be boring and tedious, but with 180 it has been made funny, exciting and very impressive, a closet hit." The game was reviewed in Your Sinclair, which rated the game 9 out of 10, stating "In its presentation, 180 does veer toward the macho, crafty cockney Bristow school of darts rather than that of Gentleman John Lowe, but otherwise there's little to quibble about - a winner across the board!" The game was reviewed in ACE, stating "The definitive computer darts game. If you must play arrows on your micro then this is the one to get."

Commodore User reviewed the Amiga version, released as World Darts, concluding that "although it doesn't fully live up to its predecessor, it's an enjoyable game in its own right and worth a look, if only for the appallingly bad artwork on the packaging."
