= Moorguard =

Tabletop role-playing game supplement

Moorguard is a 1980 fantasy role-playing game adventure published by Fantasy Productions, Inc. for the High Fantasy role-playing game.

== Plot summary ==
Moorguard is an adventure in which the player characters escape violent nomads and find a secret shrine built out of the bones of a god-king from many years ago.

Moorguard is a scenario, a quest for a legendary axe and shield with magical powers needed to help the adventurers get safely back through enemy-held territory; it includes a description of Chalice Tower and the Temple Moorguard.

== Publication history ==
Moorguard was written by Jeffrey C. Dillow and published by Fantasy Productions in 1980 as a 24-page book and a map.

== Reception ==
Ronald Pehr reviewed Moorguard in The Space Gamer No. 30. Pehr commented that "Moorguard keeps players happy and involves them in the scenario. If you like the High Fantasy rules, you'll consider Moorguard a good way to use them."

Anders Swenson reviewed Fortress Ellendar and Moorguard for Different Worlds magazine and stated that "With a copy of High Fantasy in hand, it is easy to transliterate the monster notation to correspond to most of the major game systems, and these books are both very good examples of the narrative style of scenario, which many GMs may wish to examine to upgrade their own campaigns."
