= Wizards & Warriors X: The Fortress of Fear =

1990 video game

- North American cover art
- Developer: Rare
- Publishers: NA: Acclaim; EU: Nintendo
- Artist: Chris Peli
- Composer: David Wise
- Series: Wizards & Warriors
- Platform: Game Boy
- Release: NA: January 1990; EU: November 1990
- Mode: Single-player

Wizards & Warriors X: The Fortress of Fear is a 1990 video game developed by Rare and published by Acclaim Entertainment for the Game Boy. Taking place after the events of Ironsword: Wizards & Warriors II, the game follows the knight warrior Kuros as he sets out to the Fortress of Fear to defeat the evil wizard Malkil, who, after 17 years of dormancy, has captured Princess Elaine and has imprisoned her there.

Wizards & Warriors X consists of five "Chapters" that comprise 18 levels. In contrast to the previous games in the series, gameplay is more linear. Reviews were mainly negative and focused on the slow gameplay, lack of continues, and the blurring caused by scrolling on the Game Boy. Moreover, in response to the game's title (Chapter X), some gaming magazines asked what happened to the intermediate chapters in the Wizards & Warriors series.

== Gameplay ==
Gameplay of Wizards & Warriors X, in which Kuros attacks an enemy skeleton with his sword

Wizards & Warriors X: The Fortress of Fear is an action platform game in which players assume the role of Kuros as he battles through the Fortress of Fear to defeat the evil wizard Malkil. Gameplay is more of a hack and slash type and is linear, in contrast to the previous games in the series. The game consists of five "Chapters" that comprise 18 levels in total. Players can move Kuros with the control pad and can make him jump and attack enemies by pressing the other buttons. The main objectives in each level are to increase score by defeating enemies and collecting gems, maintain Kuros' life force by collecting food and ale, and gain magic powers by collecting various spells. To accomplish these objectives, players need to find keys and open treasure chests, collect all items, avoid hazardous objects, and defeat any enemies who stand in the way. Throughout the game, players can collect various magic spells to help aid Kuros along the way. These spells are mostly found in locked chests and include the "Shield of Protection", the "Potion of Healing", the "Spell of Invincibility", and the "Boots of Jumping". At the end of each "Chapter" is a boss, which must be defeated before moving to later levels.

Kuros' life force, which consists of a series of hearts located at the top of the screen, decreases every time he sustains damage from enemies and hazardous objects or if he falls too far a distance; the player loses a life if Kuros' life force runs out or if he falls off the screen, and the game ends if all lives are lost. However, players can collect food and ale to help replenish Kuros' life force, and they can collect miniature versions of Kuros for extra lives. If the game ends, and a high enough score is obtained, players can register their initials and high score in "The Scroll of Honor", where, according to the game's manual, "the scores of the greatest warriors ever to enter the Fortress of Fear are recorded". However, the players' high scores are erased once the device is turned off. The game does not offer continues, so players must restart the game from the beginning every time the game ends.

== Plot ==
The events in Wizards & Warriors X: The Fortress of Fear take place after the events in Ironsword: Wizards & Warriors II. The game features the knight warrior Kuros, "one of the bravest warriors ever to wield the IronSword" as well as the only person to defeat the evil wizard Malkil. After Malkil's defeat in Ironsword, he went into seclusion for more than 17 years, during which nobody heard from him. Then, Princess Elaine disappears without a trace, in which Kuros believes that Malkil has captured her and imprisoned her in the dreaded Fortress of Fear, located in the woods of Zanifer. Kuros then ventures into the Fortress of Fear to stop Malkil from furthering his evil plans. However, many people have gone inside the Fortress of Fear, but none of them survived.

== Reception ==
Reception

Review score
Publication	Score
Electronic Gaming Monthly	7/10, 7/10, 7/10, 7/10

Wizards & Warriors X: The Fortress of Fear was developed by UK-based video game company Rare, and was published by Acclaim Entertainment in January 1990 in North America. It was briefly covered in Nintendo Power magazine in its May–June 1990 issue. There, the staff was questioning as to why Acclaim titled the game Chapter X, saying that "if we find out what happened to Chapters III through IX, we'll let you know". It was also reviewed in UK-based gaming magazine Mean Machines, where they praised the game overall, but they criticized the level of blurring caused on the Game Boy by the scrolling. According to reviewer Julian Rignall: "It's a shame that this features such blurry scrolling, because otherwise it's a great game."

In a retrospective of the entire Wizards & Warriors series, UK-based retrogaming magazine Retro Gamer asked the same question Nintendo Power did 20 years earlier, asking what happened to the fourth through ninth chapters of the series. They noted the more linear hack and slash gameplay that differentiated it from its NES counterparts. The game was mostly criticized by the magazine for its slow gameplay, high difficulty level (in which they claim it is more difficult than Ironsword), and lack of continues. Wrongly suspecting that the game was never released in Europe, they said that it "might have been a blessing in disguise".
