= Murder in Irliss =

Tabletop role-playing game supplement

Murder in Irliss is an adventure published by Reston Publishing in 1982 for the single-player fantasy role-playing game High Fantasy.

== Plot summary ==
In 1978, Jeffrey Dillow and Craig Fisher designed a single-player role-playing game called High Fantasy. In 1982, Reston Publishing released Murder in Irliss, a 149-page adventure written by Jeffrey Dillow for the High Fantasy system.

The adventure scenario is intended for a single player character, and is set in the kingdom of Irliss, where Prince Rand has been assassinated. The player takes on the role of Faren, the Captain of the Guards, who is given the task of discovering the murderer.

The player starts the adventure at Scene 1 out of 605; the choice the player makes at the end of each scene determines the path taken through the book, ultimately leading to success or failure. It is replayable because the killer is a different character each time the adventure is played. There are actually five murder mysteries with different clues — the player chooses one of five "fatestones" at the start of the adventure; each fatestone leads the player down a different path through the adventure, each leading to a different murderer.

== Publication history ==
Murder in Irliss was written by Jeffrey C. Dillow and published by Reston Publishing in 1982 as a 145-page book.

== Reception ==
In the August 1982 edition of The Space Gamer (No. 54), David J. Arlington noted the relatively high purchase price ($10.95 in 1982), but highly recommended the adventure, saying, "If the high price doesn't put you off, you should purchase this just to see how well a solo adventure can be done when done properly. It's by far the best one I've played yet."

In the December 1982 edition of Dragon (Issue #68), Robert Plamandon played this adventure more than once — "with wildly different results each time." He concluded that the High Fantasy adventures "show that an 'interactive novel' approach to solo adventures is more than workable — it's the best way to write them."
