= Ironsword: Wizards & Warriors II =

1989 video game

- Box art of Ironsword: Wizards & Warriors II. Italian model Fabio Lanzoni portrays the protagonist Kuros on the game’s cover, but he does not make an in-game appearance.
- Developer: Zippo Games
- Publisher: Acclaim Entertainment
- Designers: Ste Pickford; Steve Hughes
- Programmer: Steve Hughes
- Artists: Ste Pickford; Tim Stamper
- Composer: David Wise
- Series: Wizards & Warriors
- Platform: Nintendo Entertainment System
- Release: NA: December 1989; EU: 27 March 1991
- Genres: Action, platform
- Mode: Single-player

Ironsword: Wizards & Warriors II (also known as Wizards and Warriors II: Ironsword) is an action platform video game developed by Zippo Games and published by Acclaim Entertainment for the Nintendo Entertainment System. It was released in North America in December 1989 and in Europe on 27 March 1991. It is the sequel to Rare's 1987 title Wizards & Warriors. In Ironsword, the player controls the knight warrior Kuros as he ventures in the land of Sindarin. He must defeat the evil wizard Malkil, who has assumed the elemental forms of Earth, Wind, Fire, and Water. Kuros must collect the parts of and assemble the legendary "IronSword" in order to defeat Malkil, who resides at the top of IceFire Mountain.

The game was fairly well-received, selling 500,000 copies in North America and 50,000 copies in Europe. It received praise for its size, graphics and sound, detailed characters and bosses, and gameplay, with criticism for its lack of originality. Rare responded positively to the game, which led to Zippo Games being contracted to develop games for Rare such as Solar Jetman: Hunt for the Golden Warpship and Wizards & Warriors III: Kuros: Visions of Power, eventually being folded into the company as Rare Manchester.

== Gameplay ==
Ironsword: Wizards & Warriors II is a platforming video game in which the player controls the renowned warrior Kuros as he explores the land of Sindarin to defeat the evil wizard Malkil. This time, Malkil has taken the form of the four "Elementals", Earth, Wind, Fire, and Water – to stop Kuros in his quest. The objective is to assemble the legendary "IronSword" – the only weapon that can defeat Malkil – and defeat the evil wizard who lies at the peak of IceFire Mountain. In the game, players can move Kuros left or right, or make him crouch with the control pad; the buttons allow Kuros to jump, to use his sword or a magic spell to defeat enemies, to access the "Magic Spell Screen", or to pause the game. Kuros has a life meter that decreases every time he sustains damage from an enemy or a dangerous projectile, or if he falls for too long a distance. Along the way, players can collect chicken and brew to replenish Kuros's life meter. Kuros loses a life when his life meter runs out, and the game ends when he loses all his lives. However, players may continue and restart the game where they left off up to two times. The continue feature would normally be disabled after the player had completed the earth domain, but due to an in-game bug, the player actually loses the continue function immediately upon merely setting foot in the domain.

Kuros battles the game's first boss, the Wind Elemental. In developing the game's bosses, Ste Pickford tried to fill as much of the screen and to use as few moving sprites as possible.

Ironsword: Wizards & Warriors II consists of four levels called "domains," each named after the four elementals. In each domain, Kuros must find a golden artifact that belongs to the domain's "Animal King" and return it to him. Upon doing so, the path to the second part of the domain will appear. In the second part, Kuros must find the magic spell necessary to defeat the boss – the domain's Elemental. Without the spell, it is impossible to damage the boss, or even remain in the room with him. Once the elemental in each stage has been destroyed, Kuros obtains a piece of the IronSword, which is needed for the final battle on Icefire Mountain. Throughout the game, players must collect items, spells, and money to progress. Money helps buy magic spells, more powerful weapons, shields, helmets, keys to open locked treasure chests, and additional food. Treasure chests – located throughout the game – can contain one of the following items: Additional money, magic spells, or weapon and armor upgrades. In each domain, players can visit inns where they can buy food, keys, or items; they may also participate in a "Bonus chance" game where they may gamble their money to see which cup a bouncing skull will fall into.

In the game, magic spells help against enemies and Elemental bosses; some are bought, while others must be found. Magic spells include "The Familiar Spell," which turns enemies into money and helps retrieve golden objects, the "Dragon Tooth Spell," which turns enemies into food, the "Veil of Slumber Spell," which slows down enemies, the "Silver Fleece Spell," which makes Kuros temporarily invincible, and the "Water Spout Spell," which creates an upward column of water that allows Kuros to reach high places. Each spell has a limited number of uses before it vanishes from the player's inventory. Other magic spells are necessary to defeat the Elemental bosses. These spells are found in each of the four domains, and include "Windbane," "Blightwater," "Firesmite" and "Earthscorch." These spells can be used only in the corresponding levels in which they are obtained, and each consumes magic upon use. Players can obtain additional magic by collecting small, floating, gold bubbles that appear randomly or are triggered by the player's proximity to secret locations.

Players may also increase their score by defeating enemies or collecting items. Hidden along the way are the "Relics of Sindarin," which are worth many points when collected; these consist of a book, cross, gauntlet, and ring. At the end of the game, players with a high enough score can place their names in the "IronSword Hall of Fame." However, the list resets when the console is turned off. The game also includes a password feature in which players can obtain a password from the "Magic Spell Screen" to use to continue the game at a later time, even after the console has been turned off.

== Development ==
Ironsword: Wizards & Warriors II was developed by UK-based computer game company Zippo Games, headed by Ste and John Pickford; this was the first game Zippo developed for fellow UK-based video game company Rare. At the time, Zippo Games had just completed a previous game titled Cosmic Pirate - a game that was published by Palace Software and released for the Commodore 64, Atari ST, and Amiga in 1988. New to the technical capabilities of the Nintendo Entertainment System, the Pickford brothers visited Rare and were pleased with their NES library, though they thought they were backtracking by deciding to develop games for the console. According to Ste Pickford: "The NES seemed primitive by comparison, sub-Commodore 64. But the games were ten times better than everything being released for home computers, which we appreciated, and we wanted to try to make games as good as that." Rare decided to hire Zippo Games to develop this Wizards & Warriors sequel; Pickford remarked: "Rare showed us Wizards & Warriors and asked us to develop the sequel, and pretty much left us to it." Rare felt that Zippo Games was trustworthy enough to develop the sequel without much help from them.

Development started in early 1989, when the Pickford brothers were still learning about the NES and what it could do. At the same time, as being new to developing console video games, they were also learning about the market aspects and Nintendo's policies and restrictions on games. Feeling that the graphics in most of the games in the NES library were poor, they placed emphasis on the graphics and animation. Pickford was particularly pleased with the animation of the enemy eagles and their movement. Rare assisted with the sound, and all of the game's background music was composed by video game composer David Wise, who Pickford said "did a fantastic job on IronSword". As far as gameplay was concerned, they tried to expand upon its predecessor, introducing more adventure-based gameplay and additional RPG elements such as magic, inns, and money.

=== Graphics and animation ===
Ste Pickford developed the gameplay map for Ironsword. According to him, he basically copied the map that was used in a conversion port of Ghosts 'n Goblins that he developed a couple of years earlier. Moreover, the Pickford brothers were trying to resemble Ghosts 'n Goblins and similar games by Capcom as part of their attempt to earn the rights to develop the game from Rare. For the map screen, Ste Pickford used specific character data in the ROM itself, used the font from elsewhere in the data that was inserted separately, and overlaid the Elementals' floating heads over the top of the graphic. According to Pickford: "The job of graphic was always about 30% drawing, and about 70% fiddly technical stuff (which was why so many terrible artists – people who couldn't draw at all – made decent video game artists back then, if they could manage the technical side of things well enough)."

In developing the game's graphics, Ste Pickford translated black and white sketches into the character maps in the game. For the bosses, the plan was to use the entire screen while involving as few moving sprites as possible "to fool the player into thinking the whole thing was alive". The same was done with the "Dragon King", which was not one of the game's bosses; the dragon's head and neck were composed of sprites, while the rest of the body was considered part of the background. The dragon's neck stretched out vertically due to NES hardware sprite limitations horizontally.

The animation of the eagle (the "Eagle King") that transports Kuros to the Wind Elemental was one of Ste Pickford's first graphics which he drew for the NES. It was done in Deluxe Paint for the Amiga with sketching done by mouse - without assistance from graphics tablets or other scanners. He took eagle drawings from a book on animals in motion by Eadweard Muybridge. Pickford wanted to show off the possible graphical capabilities of the NES; he said, "I wanted to do something 'flashy' early in the game, trying to show off my amazing graphic art skills on the rather primitive NES. We were working on Amiga and ST games at the same time, so were always trying to push the NES with bigger and better graphics, right from the start of our work on the machine." The eagle consisted of only three colors and between 11 and 17 sprites per frame of animation. There was a smaller version of the same eagle, which was used as a regular enemy in that level.

Development of the game's title screen was inspired by loading screens that were used in most computer games at the time; the objective was to create a nice-looking graphic while waiting for the game to load, even though the NES, more rooted in arcade traditions, did not require that. Pickford spent most of his character space on the title screen image; he was limited in the number of available colors due to the more limited graphic capabilities of the NES (as opposed to most home computers), as it was more designed for scrolling and animation and not for stationary graphics. The sword in the title screen used character sprites and used a different palette from the picture of Kuros himself; the sword had to be vertical as the NES hardware did not allow for too many sprites horizontally. Pickford planned to use, and completed, an Ironsword logo of his own when Acclaim made him use their planned logo, which he said "was a bit more bland and blocky, with detail that didn't work very well at such a low pixel resolution".

=== Release ===
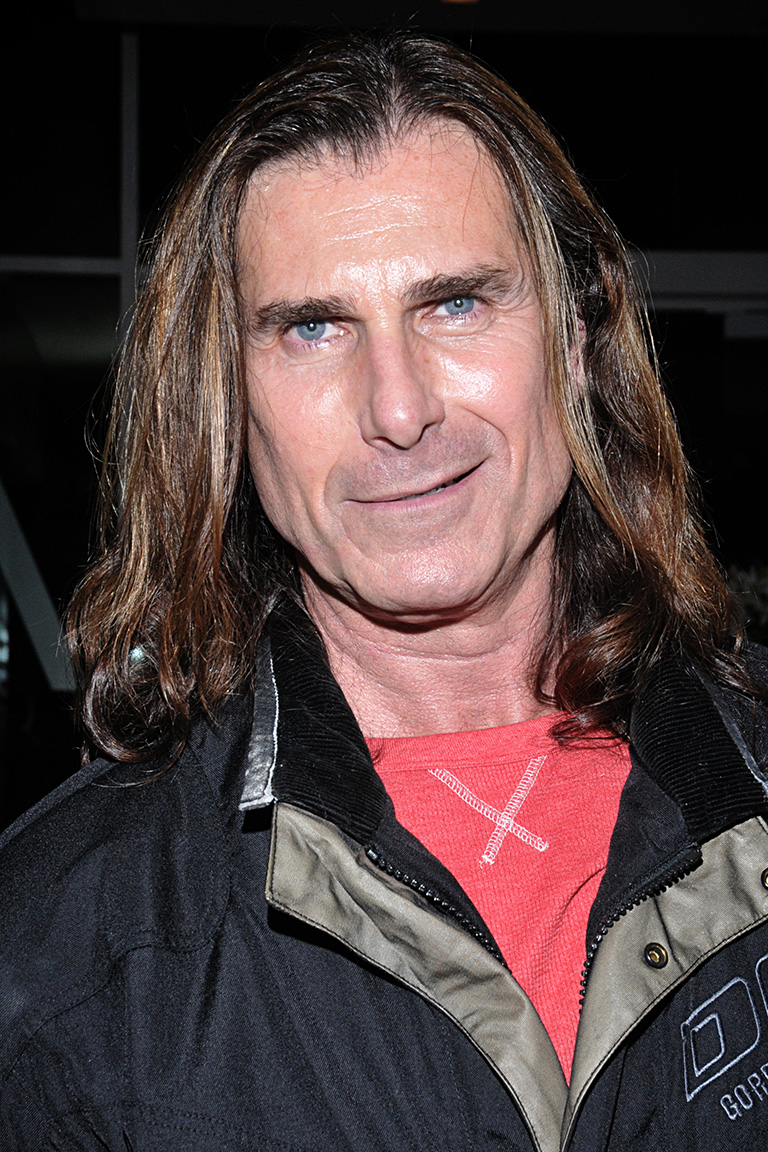
Fabio in 2014. For Ironsword's front cover, he posed bare-chested and without armor, which Ste Pickford found unsuitable for a game about a knight.

Ironsword: Wizards & Warriors II was first unveiled in North America as part of the 1989 Winter Consumer Electronics Show in Las Vegas, Nevada and was displayed with other games to be released later that year by Acclaim. It was mentioned as a future game in the May 1989 premiere issue of video gaming magazine Electronic Gaming Monthly. It was also covered in GamePro's premiere issue the same month. Finally, it was previewed by Nintendo Power in its July–August 1989 issue.

For the game's cover, Acclaim hired Italian male model Fabio Lanzoni to pose as Kuros; Fabio was presented on the cover bare-chested and without armor. When Zippo Games saw the image of the cover a week prior to its release, they were perplexed. According to Ste Pickford, "Our jaws hit the floor when we first saw this image (which was, being merely the developers, probably about a week before the game's release). Why on earth did they choose a photograph of a bare-chested barbarian to promote a game starring a knight in shining armour?". Pickford added that "We used it as an example of the lack of imagination of Americans", while suggesting that having an actual suit or armor would be too costly to use for a photo shoot. Ironsword: Wizards & Warriors II was released by Acclaim for the NES in North America in December 1989 and in Europe and Australia in 1991. It managed to sell about 500,000 copies in North America and about 50,000 copies in Europe. Following the game's release, Zippo Games would proceed to develop its next game for Rare, Solar Jetman: Hunt for the Golden Warpship; they would eventually also release the third installment in the Wizards & Warriors series, Wizards & Warriors III: Kuros: Visions of Power.

The television advertisement consisted of a boy who is shown playing the first Wizards & Warriors game when a Conan the Barbarian-lookalike enters his room after having defeated a monster and hands him a copy of Ironsword. After describing the brief plot and shortly showing clips of the game, the Conan-lookalike leaves his room while exclaiming, "The fate of the world is in your hands! Back vile beast!". At the end of the commercial, after briefly playing Ironsword, the boy opens the door in his room, only to find his dog, who now has smoke coming from his behind.

== Reception ==
Reception

Review scores
Publication	Score
Electronic Gaming Monthly	8/8/7/7
Mean Machines	77%

Award
Publication	Award
Game Players	Game Player's NES Excellence Award, 1990

Ironsword: Wizards & Warriors II was initially reviewed and received positive ratings in the June 1989 issue of Electronic Gaming Monthly. Steve Harris said that the game was very large and expansive, noting that it "is so big, and has so much to offer, most of the competition pales by comparison". Ed Semrad called the game "a worthy sequel that fortunately is better than the original", similarly noting the game's size as well as difficulty. Donn Nauert appreciated the game's good graphics which complement the adventure theme, but he noted that some of the precise movements that are required in various areas may cause some frustration in gameplay. Jim Allee praised all the aspects of the game, saying "if you liked Wizards & Warriors, you'll love Ironsword". All four reviewers lauded the game's involving gameplay and graphics.

The game would also be featured in the magazine's September 1989 issue, in which it was named the magazine's "Game of the Month"; it also featured the game's box art, with Fabio, on the cover. The reviewers, the U.S. National Video Game Team, noted that the game was superior to its predecessor as well as other games released at the time, noting that it was particularly better than Castlevania II: Simon's Quest. They praised its well-detailed and thought-out graphics, the inclusion of well-drawn out large bosses and supporting characters, the sound which "has an eerie tone that sets the mood for the whole game", and additional features which expanded upon the game's predecessor. They concluded that Ironsword was "one of the most welcome Nintendo Entertainment System games in a long time". The game was also one of the featured games in the November–December 1989 issue of Nintendo Power, where it received six pages of coverage and featured a poster of the game. Game Players magazine awarded Ironsword the "Game Player's NES Excellence Award" as one of the best games for the console in 1990.

The game was also featured in UK-based magazine Mean Machines in May 1991. Matt Regan said that he was not impressed with the game, saying that similar platforming games such as DuckTales and Gremlins 2: The New Batch were superior to Ironsword and had a more original approach in gameplay. He also criticized the fact that players cannot hit enemies while in mid-air. However, he noted the game's good gameplay. Julian Rignall also said that the game was fun, but it was not spectacular. However, just as Regan noted, Rignall said that the game did not offer anything special like with better titles such as Mega Man 2 or Super Mario Bros. 2. However, he noted the game's good graphics and challenge, though both noted that the backgrounds "are slightly bland". Both reviewers said the game was well-presented with good introductions and a password mode, easy controls, fair challenge, and "fairly good tunes and effects which fit the action well". Overall, they said that Ironsword was "a fun but ultimately limited game that will appeal to platform fans".

Ironsword: Wizards & Warriors II was listed at #64 in IGN's list of "Top 100 NES Games". Reviewer Sam Claiborn said that the game was more expansive than its predecessor and that it featured many of the good graphics, gameplay, and usage of Middle English. He also noted that "Fabio's bare-breasted likeness smoldering on IronSword's cover art that made this game a smash hit with kids and moms alike". Website GamesRadar praised the game's music, especially the title theme; Brett Elston said it set a serious tone for the game, saying "its heavy, droning beats mix with a fantasy-minded melody that make it sound like a funeral dirge in the Shire".

The game's cover, which features Fabio, has received significant coverage from many gaming websites. IGN listed Ironsword as having one of the most notable covers in video game history, listing its cover as the 2nd best of all time behind Ninja Golf. Conversely, 1UP.com listed Ironsword as having one of the worst covers of all time, comparing it to the cover for Mega Man. GameSpy listed it as the 4th worst video game cover in history, saying that "thanks to the presence of Fabio on the cover, gamers got confused and thought they had accidentally picked up one of their mom's romance novels". In a retrospective of the NES for the console's 25th anniversary, Nintendo Power wrote that "the game's quality will be forever overshadowed by Acclaim's choice of Fabio as the cover model".
