= Taz Express =

2000 video game

- Developer: Zed Two
- Publisher: Infogrames
- Producer: Ste Pickford
- Designer: John Pickford
- Programmers: Steve Hughes; Jan van Valburg; David Bone Gill
- Composer: David Evans
- Platform: Nintendo 64
- Release: EU & AU: August 1, 2000
- Genres: Puzzle, Platformer
- Mode: Single-player

Taz Express is a 2000 puzzle-platform game developed by Zed Two and published by Infogrames for the Nintendo 64. Based on the Looney Tunes franchise, the game was only released in Europe and Oceania.

== Gameplay ==
In the game, the player takes control of Taz and must deliver crates to various destinations in the game. The crate must remain intact until it reaches its intended destination. Each player starts with three lives that are shaped like crates. If the crate is destroyed by dropping it, Taz's spin or if it falls into a hole and water, the player will lose a life. if the player loses all three lives, the game is over. If the player collects all fifty tokens in each level, at the end of the level, they obtain an extra life for a crate. At the beginning of the level, Taz has full energy, which allows him to run faster, low energy will cause Taz to slow down. if he is hit by cars, lasers, falls into water, holes, ground, or other things, he will lose a health point. His spin ability can only be activated when Taz's running bar is full, but if the bar is too low, he won't be able to spin.

== Development and release ==
Taz Express was developed by Zed Two. It was shortly shown at E3 1998, but had a longer showing at the next year's E3. It was set to release in 1999, but was then delayed into 2000.

Originally scheduled to launch in North American in October 2000, the release was ultimately canceled following poor sales of the game in Europe. It was only released in Europe in August 2000.

== Reception ==
Reception

Review scores
Publication	Score
Consoles +	5%
Hyper	75/100
Jeuxvideo.com	12/20
N64 Magazine	27%
Nintendo Power	6.8/10
Official Nintendo Magazine	85%
Video Games (DE)	53%
64	84%
Nintendo Acción	88/100
Nintendo World	65%
SuperJuegos	81/100

The game received polarizing feedback from critics. Some reviews were favorable, such as Nintendo Acción's 88/100 score and Official Nintendo Magazine's 85% praise, while other reviews like N64 Magazine's 27% rating and Consoles +'s 5% criticism were far less positive.

Jeuxvideo.com said "Taz Express has all the ingredients of a good license game, but not really those of a good game at all."
