= Tress MacNeille =

American voice actress

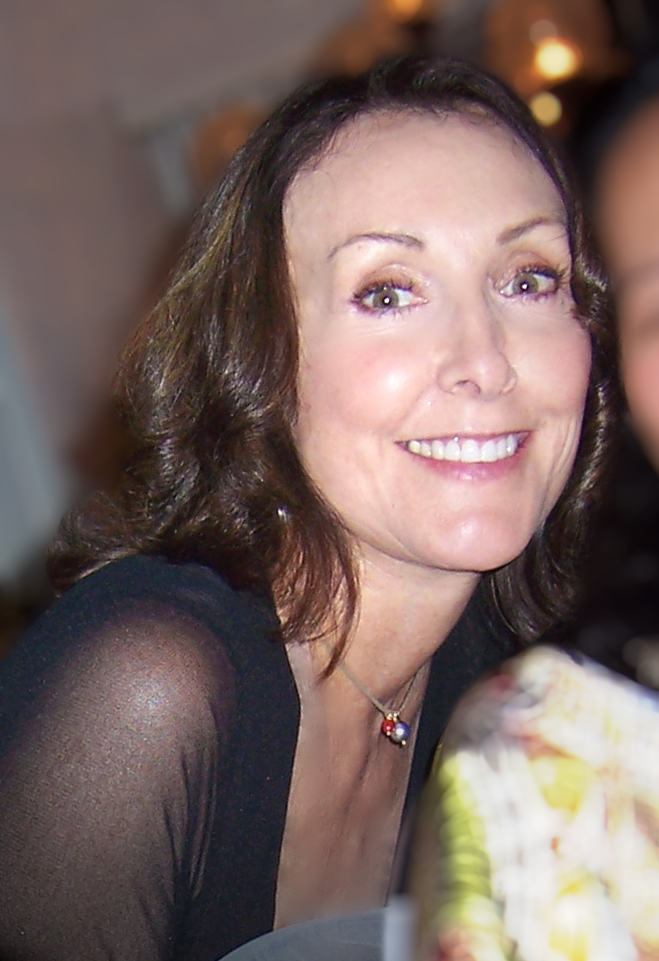
- MacNeille in 2007
- Born: Teressa Claire Payne
- Other name: Tress MacNeill
- Occupation: Voice actress
- Years active: 1979–present

Teressa Claire "Tress" MacNeille (née Payne) is an American voice actress. She is known for her roles such as Dot Warner on the animated television series Animaniacs and its revival, Babs Bunny on Tiny Toon Adventures, Daisy Duck in various Disney media since 1999, Chip and Gadget Hackwrench on Chip 'n Dale: Rescue Rangers, and a variety of characters including Agnes Skinner, Brandine Spuckler, Lindsey Naegle, Dolph Shapiro, and Crazy Cat Lady in The Simpsons since 1990. She has also worked on animated series such as Disenchantment, Rugrats, and Hey Arnold!

== Career ==
MacNeille was a member of the improvisational comedy group The Groundlings for ten years. She sang and appeared (as Lucille Ball) in the music video for "Weird Al" Yankovic's song "Ricky" (1983), which was based on the I Love Lucy television show and parodied the song "Mickey" by Toni Basil.

MacNeille was cast as Babs Bunny in Tiny Toon Adventures (1990–1992). Writer Paul Dini said that MacNeille was good for the role because she could do both Babs's voice and the voices of her impressions. MacNeille commented: "The best part of doing Babs is that she's a mimic, like me...In the show I do Babs doing Billie Burke, Katharine Hepburn, Bette Davis, Madonna, and Cher. I even have her doing Jessica Rabbit." By 1992, MacNeille had become the first voice actress to earn more than $1 million per year, and one of the most popular voice actresses in the industry.

MacNeille was brought in to voice Dot Warner, one of the show's three main characters because Dot's character was very similar to Babs Bunny. MacNeille was nominated for an Annie Award for her performance on the show in 1995.

== Filmography ==
=== Film ===
List of voice performances in feature and direct-to-video films
Year	Title	Role	Notes
1984	Indiana Jones and the Temple of Doom	1st Boy in Cell	Voice dub; uncredited
1985	The Compleat Al	Francine, Lucy Ricardo	
1986	My Little Pony: The End of Flutter Valley	Hydia	
1987	Spaceballs	Dink	
1988	Elvira: Mistress of the Dark	Great-Aunt Morgana Talbot	
1991	Rover Dangerfield	Queenie, Hen, Turkey, Chorus Girls, Chickens	
1992	Tiny Toon Adventures: How I Spent My Vacation	Babs Bunny, Big Boo, Babs' Mother, Drive-Thru Waitress	Direct-to-video
1994	The Land Before Time II: The Great Valley Adventure	Ducky's Mom, Petrie's Mom, Mother Maiasaura	Direct-to-video
1995	Gordy	Wendy	
1995	The Land Before Time III: The Time of the Great Giving	Stegosaurus, Spike and Ducky's Mother	Direct-to-video
1995	Carrotblanca	Kitty Ketty	Short film
1996	Homeward Bound II: Lost in San Francisco	French Poodle	
1996	I Was a Teenage Mermaid	Princess Attina, The Little White Teenage Girl	Direct-to-video
1996	The Land Before Time IV: Journey Through the Mists	Ali's Mother, Dil	Direct-to-video
1997	Annabelle's Wish	Hen #2	Direct-to-video
1997	The Land Before Time V: The Mysterious Island	Ducky's Mother, Petrie's Mother	Direct-to-video
1998	The Rugrats Movie	Charlotte Pickles	
1999	Mickey's Once Upon a Christmas	Daisy Duck (Gift of the Magi), Chip, Aunt Gertie	Direct-to-video
1999	Winnie the Pooh: Seasons of Giving	Kanga	Direct-to-video
1999	Scooby-Doo! and the Witch's Ghost	Sarah Ravencroft	Direct-to-video
1999	The Nuttiest Nutcracker	L'il Pea, Broccoli Floret	Direct-to-video
1999	Wakko's Wish	Dot Warner, Hello Nurse, Mindy's Mother, Marita Hippo	Direct-to-video Nominated - Annie Award for Female Voice Acting in a Feature Production
2000	The Land Before Time VII: The Stone of Cold Fire	Ducky's Mother, Petrie's Mother	Direct-to-video
2000	Rugrats in Paris: The Movie	Charlotte Pickles	
2000	Tweety's High-Flying Adventure	Miss Prissy, Airplane Worker, Queen of England	Direct-to-video
2001	The Land Before Time VIII: The Big Freeze	Ducky's Mom, Petrie's Mom	Direct-to-video
2001	Recess: School's Out	Lunchlady Iram, Ms. Lemon, Dr. Steinheimer, Opera Director	
2001	Lady and the Tramp II: Scamp's Adventure	Aunt Sarah, Am	Direct-to-video
2001	Mickey's Magical Christmas: Snowed in at the House of Mouse	Daisy Duck, Chip, Dale	Direct-to-video
2002	The Land Before Time IX: Journey to Big Water	Ducky's Mom, Petrie's Mom	Direct-to-video
2002	Cinderella II: Dreams Come True	Anastasia Tremaine, Pretty Women	Direct-to-video
2002	Mickey's House of Villains	Daisy Duck, Am	
2002	Tom and Jerry: The Magic Ring	Margaret, Mom	
2002	Hey Arnold!: The Movie	Gertrude Shortman, Mayor Dixie, Red	
2003	George of the Jungle 2	Tiger, Shep the Elephant	Direct-to-video
2003	Stitch! The Movie	Computer	Direct-to-video
2003	Rugrats Go Wild	Charlotte Pickles	
2003	Recess: Taking the Fifth Grade	Lunchlady Irma, BoE Agent #2, Intercom voice	Direct-to-video
2003	Whizzard of Ow	Lady on Phone	Short film
2004	The Lion King III: Hakuna Matata	Female Meerkat Digger #1, additional voices	Direct-to-video
2004	Mulan II	Female Ancestors, Villager Woman	Direct-to-video
2004	Mickey, Donald, Goofy: The Three Musketeers	Daisy Duck	Direct-to-video
2004	The Chronicles of Riddick: Dark Fury	Antonia Chillingsworth	Direct-to-video
2004	Mickey's Twice Upon a Christmas	Daisy Duck	Direct-to-video
2005	Tom and Jerry: The Fast and the Furry	Soccer Mom, Tour Girl, Lady, Mermaid Monster	Direct-to-video
2005	Kronk's New Groove	Additional voices	Direct-to-video
2005	The Land Before Time XI: Invasion of the Tinysauruses	Petrie's Mom	Direct-to-video
2005	The Legend of Frosty the Snowman	Mrs. Simple, Girl #1	Direct-to-video
2006	Brother Bear 2	Hoonah	Direct-to-video
2006	Leroy & Stitch	Bonnie, Gigi	Direct-to-video
2006	Queer Duck: The Movie	Melissa, Barbra Streisand	Direct-to-video
2006	The Ant Bully	Old Council Ant	
2006	The Land Before Time XII: The Great Day of the Flyers	Petrie's Mom	Direct-to-video
2006	Happily N'Ever After	Witch #1	Direct-to-video
2007	Cinderella III: A Twist in Time	Anastasia Tremaine	
2007	The Simpsons Movie	Agnes Skinner, Mrs. Muntz, Cookie Kwan, Lindsey Naegle, Sweet Old Lady, Colin, Medicine Woman, Girl on Phone, additional voices	
2007	Disney Princess Enchanted Tales: Follow Your Dreams	Merryweather	Direct-to-video
2007	Bee Movie	Jeanette Chung, Mother, Cow	
2007	Futurama: Bender's Big Score		Direct-to-video
2008	Futurama: The Beast with a Billion Backs	Additional voices	Direct-to-video
2008	Futurama: Bender's Game		Direct-to-video
2009	Futurama: Into the Wild Green Yonder		Direct-to-video
2011	Hoodwinked Too! Hood vs. Evil	Vera, Women's Voice	
2011	Book of Dragons	Bork's Wife	Short film
2013	Batman: The Dark Knight Returns	Selina Kyle	Direct-to-video
2013	Zambezia	Neville's Wife	Direct-to-video
2015	The Flintstones & WWE: Stone Age SmackDown!	Wilma Flintstone	Direct-to-video
2017	The Jetsons & WWE: Robo-WrestleMania!	Rosie the Robot Maid	Direct-to-video
2021	Plusaversary	Maleficent	Short film
2022	Chip 'n Dale: Rescue Rangers	Gadget Hackwrench, Chip (High-Pitched)	
2022	Welcome to the Club	Cruella de Vil, Evil Queen, Queen of Hearts	Short film
2024	May the 12th Be with You	Bambi's Mother, Evil Queen, Mrs. Potts	Short film
2024	The Most Wonderful Time of the Year	Evil Queen	Short film

=== Animation ===
List of voice performances in television shows
Year	Title	Role	Notes
1979	Scooby-Doo and Scrappy-Doo	Additional voices	
1982	Richie Rich	Additional voices	Episode: "Dollar's Exercise/Richie's Cube/Maltese Monkey/Everybody's Doing It"
1982	Shirt Tales	Additional voices	13 episodes
1982–89	The Smurfs	Sylvia, additional voices	3 episodes
1983	The Paragon of Comedy		TV film
1983	Rubik, the Amazing Cube	Additional voices	
1983	Saturday Supercade	Additional voices	13 episodes
1983	Deck the Halls with Wacky Walls	Springette	TV film
1983–87	Alvin and the Chipmunks	Additional voices	42 episodes
1984	The Littles	Additional voices	8 episodes
1984	My Little Pony	Additional voices	TV film; part of My Little Pony franchise
1984	Cabbage Patch Kids: First Christmas	Bertha, Lavender MacDade, Wife	TV film; part of Cabbage Patch Kids franchise
1984	Voltron	Queen Merla	9 episodes
1984	The New Scooby-Doo Mysteries	Sheriff Parker, Norma Deathman	2 episodes
1984	ABC Weekend Special	Neddy	Episode: "Bad Cat"
1984	Cheeseball Presents	Various characters	TV film
1985	It's Punky Brewster	Additional voices	
1985	Challenge of the GoBots	Spay-C	Episode: "Return to Gobotron: Part 5"
1985	The Wuzzles	Mrs. Pedigree, Transylvia	4 episodes
1986	My Little Pony 'n Friends	Flowers	2 episodes
1986	Lazer Tag Academy	Mrs. Jaren	13 episodes
1986	The Centurions	Additional voices	62 episodes
1986	Sectaurs	Additional voices	
1986	MoonDreamers	Ursa Major, Scowlene	Episode: "Zodies on the Loose"
1986–88	The Flintstone Kids	Additional voices	34 episodes
1987	Yogi's Great Escape	Boy, Cowboy Kid #2, Mom	TV film
1987–88	Saber Rider and the Star Sheriffs	Robin, Mandy, June	5 episodes
1987–89	DuckTales	Oprah Webfeet, Mrs. Quackenbush, additional voices	11 episodes
1987–91	Disney's Adventures of the Gummi Bears	Lady Bane, Marzipan	7 episodes
1987–93	Teenage Mutant Ninja Turtles	Kala the Neutrino, Old Lady, additional voices	7 episodes
1988	Denver, the Last Dinosaur		
1988	The New Yogi Bear Show	Additional voices	4 episodes
1988	A Pup Named Scooby-Doo	Molly the Mol, additional voices	13 episodes
1988	Superman	Martha Kent	13 episodes
1989	Chip 'n' Dale's Rescue Rangers to the Rescue	Chip, Gadget Hackwrench, additional voices	TV film
1989	The Further Adventures of SuperTed	Texas Pete's Mom, Kitty, Kitty's Mom	2 episodes
1989	On the Television	Various characters	Episode: "Metaphysical Center"
1989–90	Chip 'n Dale: Rescue Rangers	Chip, Gadget Hackwrench, additional voices	Main cast
1989–90	Paddington Bear	Additional voices	2 episodes
1990	Timeless Tales from Hallmark	Duckling #4, Mother Duck, Widow Duck, Green Mallard Duck	Episode: "The Ugly Duckling"
1990	The Wizard of Oz	The Wicked Witch of the West	13 episodes
1990–91	TaleSpin	Kitten Kaboodle	2 episodes
1990–91	Zazoo U	Ms. Devine	13 episodes
1990–92	Tiny Toon Adventures	Babs Bunny, Babs' Mother, Rhubella Rat, additional voices	92 episodes
1990–92	Tom & Jerry Kids	Additional voices	2 episodes
1990–present	The Simpsons	Agnes Skinner, Dolph Shapiro, Brandine Spuckler, Crazy Cat Lady, Lindsey Naegle, Shauna Chalmers, Lunchlady Doris (2006-present), Mrs. Muntz, Mrs. Glick, Bernice Hibbert (1991-2021), Cookie Kwan, Manjula Nahasapeemapetilon (2003-2014), Kumiko Albertson (2014-2020), Ms. Albright, Hubert Wong (2009-2021), Various characters	Recurring role
1991	ProStars	Additional voices	13 episodes
1991	Darkwing Duck	Opal Windbag, Webwa Walters, additional voices	3 episodes
1991	The Wish That Changed Christmas	Mrs. Jones	TV special
1991–92	Mr. Bogus	Additional voices	5 episodes
1991–92	Mother Goose and Grimm	Additional voices	2 episodes
1992	Raw Toonage	Carrot Wife	Episode: "The Potato Network"
1992	The Little Mermaid	Additional voices	Episode: "Beached"
1992	The Plucky Duck Show	Babs Bunny, Plucky's Mom, Julia Roberts, Sean Young	8 episodes
1992	The Moo Family Holiday Hoe-Down	Additional voices	
1992–93	The Pirates of Dark Water	Additional voices	8 episodes
1992–93	Twinkle, the Dream Being	Twinkle	26 episodes
1992–2004	Rugrats	Charlotte Pickles, Receptionist, Baby Stu, additional voices	72 episodes
1993	2 Stupid Dogs	Ticket Taker, Singing Drink	Episode: "At the Drive-in"
1993	Bonkers	Mrs. Kanifky, Cheryl Germ	6 episodes
1993–94	SWAT Kats: The Radical Squadron	Deputy Mayor Calico "Callie" Briggs, Little Boy, additional voices	19 episodes
1993–94	Garfield and Friends	Monster, Crowd Walla, Norma	5 episodes
1993–94	Cro	Esmeralda	15 episodes
1993–98	Mighty Max	Max's Mom	10 episodes
1993–98	Animaniacs	Dot Warner, Hello Nurse, additional voices	Main cast
1994	Batman: The Animated Series	Women	Episode: "Time Out of Joint"
1994	Beethoven	Ginger, Aunt Lucy, additional voices	13 episodes
1994	Tiny Toon Adventures: Spring Break	Babs Bunny, Bubbie	TV short
1994–2001	The Critic	Humphrey the Hippo, additional voices	9 episodes
1995	The Shnookums & Meat Funny Cartoon Show	Wife	7 episodes
1995	Aladdin	Queen Deluca, Pharabu	3 episodes
1995	Izzy's Quest for Olympic Gold	Mom	TV film
1995	What-a-Mess	Additional voices	10 episodes
1995	Tiny Toon Adventures: Night Ghoulery	Babs Bunny	TV special
1995	Spot's Magical Christmas	Sally (Spot's Mom), Helen the Hippo, Female Reindeer	TV special; US version
1995–97	The Twisted Tales of Felix the Cat	Kids, additional voices	5 episodes
1995–97	Freakazoid!	Debbie Douglas, Cobra Queen, Princess Diana, Mary Beth, Christina, Helen, Girl, Speaker Voice, Secretary, Babeheart, Anchorwoman	20 episodes
1995–97	The Mask: Animated Series	Agnes Peenman, Soothing Voice	22 episodes
1995–98	Pinky and the Brain	Billie, Dot Warner, First Lady, additional voices	43 episodes
1995–2002	The Sylvester & Tweety Mysteries	Woman, Executive #1, Student, additional voices	21 episodes
1995–99	Timon and Pumbaa	Shenzi the Hyena, Bernice, Female Phone Voice, The Rich Lady, additional voices	12 episodes
1996	Mighty Ducks: The Animated Series	Trina	Episode: "The Return of Dr. Droid"
1996	The Tick	Regina Hume	Episode: "The Tick vs. Science"
1996	Jungle Cubs	Mahra	8 episodes
1996–97	Gargoyles: The Goliath Chronicles	Margot Yale, Judge Bates, Dr. Carrie Benjamin, TV reporter, Truck Driver, Matthew's mother	5 episodes
1996–97	Road Rovers	Colleen, additional voices	13 episodes
1996–98	All Dogs Go to Heaven: The Series	Gerta, Bess, Teddy's Mom	11 episodes
1996–98	The Spooktacular New Adventures of Casper	Ms. Banshee, additional voices	52 episodes
1996–99	Superman: The Animated Series	Annie's Mother, Mrs. Stevenson, additional voices	6 episodes
1996–2000	Adventures from the Book of Virtues	Teacher, Peter's Mother	Episode: "Self-Discipline"
1996–2004	Hey Arnold!	Gertrude Shortman, Miss Slovak, Car Show Announcer, additional voices	42 episodes
1997	What a Cartoon!	Sharon	Episode: "Swamp and Tad in 'Mission Imfrogable'"
1997	Nightmare Ned	Ms. Bundt, Cisaro	9 episodes
1997	The New Batman Adventures	Dr. Margaret Madsen, Ice Maiden #1, Little Boy	2 episodes
1997	101 Dalmatians: The Series	Cornelia	6 episodes
1997–2000	Recess	Ms. Lemon, Bertha, Lunchlady Irma, Dottie	10 episodes
1997–2004	Johnny Bravo	Wilma Flintstone, Samantha, Octavia, Women at Ticket Booth	4 episodes
1998	Oh Yeah! Cartoons	Grace, Onlooker 2#	Episode: "The Man with No Nose"
1998	Pinky, Elmyra & the Brain	Additional voices	
1998–2000	Histeria!	Pepper Mills, World's Oldest Woman, Toast, additional voices	52 episodes
1998–2001	Voltron: The Third Dimension	Lafitte, Queen Ariella, Lumina, additional voices	11 episodes
1999	The Brothers Flub	Additional voices	16 episodes
1999	Batman Beyond	Miss Winston	2 episodes
1999	Olive, the Other Reindeer	News Reporter	TV film
1999–2000	Dilbert	Various voices	28 episodes
1999–2000	Mickey Mouse Works	Daisy Duck, Chip, Dale	16 episodes
1999–2002	Mission Hill	Mrs. French, Mrs. Mundorf, Dr. Yvonne Farley	12 episodes
1999–2013, 2023–present	Futurama	Mom, Linda van Schoonhoven, Mrs. Fry, Turanga Munda, Tinny Tim, Ndnd, Hattie McDoogal, Guenter, The Grand Midwife, Robot Gypsy	
2000–01	Buzz Lightyear of Star Command	Additional voices	
2000–04	Queer Duck	Dr. Laura, Melissa Duckstein, Joan Rivers, Björk	12 episodes
2000–02	Hard Drinkin' Lincoln	Mary Todd Lincoln	16 episodes
2000–06	As Told by Ginger	Robert Joseph "Hoodsey" Bishop, Tourist, additional voices	54 episodes
2001–03	House of Mouse	Daisy Duck	50 episodes
2001–04	Lloyd in Space	Mrs. Bolt	28 episodes
2001	The Zeta Project	Macy's Mother	Episode: "Ro's Reunion"
2002	Harvey Birdman, Attorney at Law	Wilma Flintstone, Pebbles Flintstone	Episode: "The Dabba Don"
2003	ChalkZone	Spy Fly	Episode: "Disappearing Act"
2003–06	Lilo & Stitch: The Series	Bonnie, Felix, additional voices	18 episodes
2003–08	All Grown Up!	Charlotte Pickles, Sally Payson	21 episodes
2004	As Told By Ginger: The Wedding Frame	Hoodsey Bishop	TV film
2004	Teen Titans	Horror Movie Actress	Episode: "Fear Itself"
2004	Duck Dodgers	Sow	Episode: "Pig Planet"
2004–05	Father of the Pride	Chimi, Changa, additional voices	5 episodes
2004–05	Dave the Barbarian	Fang, Cheesette, Kid, additional voices	21 episodes
2004–05	My Bedbugs	Woozy	47 episodes
2005	The Adventures of Jimmy Neutron, Boy Genius	Annabelle, Aunt Kari, Great Aunt Amanda	Episode: "Clash of the Cousins"
2005	Catscratch	Sassyfrass, Woman	Episode: "The King of All Root Beer"
2006–16	Mickey Mouse Clubhouse	Daisy Duck, Chip, additional voices	125 episodes
2007	The Land Before Time	Ducky's Mom, Petrie's Mom	
2007–08	Avatar: The Last Airbender	Yangchen, Hama, additional voices	2 episodes
2008	Random! Cartoons	Ma, Mrs. Finster, Chicken	2 episodes
2008–10	Back at the Barnyard	Mother Beady, Aunt Gertie, Lady A	3 episodes
2008–13	The Garfield Show	Esmeralda Brubaker, Weakest Brain Hostess, additional voices	8 episodes
2010	Batman: The Brave and the Bold	Maid	Episode: "The Golden Age of Justice!"
2010–12	Fish Hooks	Bassy	7 episodes
2010–13	Pound Puppies	FKD, Tommy's Mom, Ally Dog #1, additional voices	9 episodes
2011	Ben 10: Ultimate Alien	Zennith	Episode: "Solitary Alignment"
2011–16	Minnie's Bow-Toons	Daisy Duck	40 episodes
2012	Sofia the First: Once Upon a Princess	Merryweather	TV film
2012–13	Kung Fu Panda: Legends of Awesomeness	Lupo, Wupo	2 episodes
2013	Wheel of Fortune	Chip	Episode: "Making Disney Memories Week"
2013–18	Sofia the First	Merryweather	11 episodes
2013–19	Mickey Mouse	Daisy Duck, Chip, additional voices	17 episodes
2014	Adventure Time	Father, Urchin, Mom	Episode: "Everything's Jake"
2014	Brickleberry	Leslie, Interior Secretary	2 episodes
2014–15	Rick and Morty	Caretaker, Roy's Mother, Mrs. Tate	2 episodes
2014–17	Sonic Boom	Additional voices	7 episodes
2014–16	VeggieTales in the House	Junior Asparagus, Laura Carrot, Madame Blueberry, Petunia Rhubarb, additional voices	Main cast
2014–16	The 7D	Gingerbread Witch, Lady Ginorma, Maid Marzipan, additional voices	10 episodes
2014–18	Clash-A-Rama	Villagers, Skeletons, Witch, Night Witch, Valkyrie, Archer, Healer, Archer Queen, Musketeers, Princess	
2015	VeggieTales	Madame Blueberry, Petunia Rhubarb, Laura Carrot	Episode: "Noah's Ark"
2015	The Mr. Peabody & Sherman Show	Florence Nightingale, The Oracle, additional voices	2 episodes
2016	Turbo Fast	Flavia, Grasshopper, Milly	Episode: "The Ants and the Grasshoppers"
2016	Duck the Halls: A Mickey Mouse Christmas Special	Daisy Duck	TV special
2016–18	The Adventures of Puss in Boots	Roz	2 episodes
2016–19	The Powerpuff Girls	Zeitgeist, Nostrilla DuPoint	
2017	The Scariest Story Ever: A Mickey Mouse Halloween Spooktacular	Daisy Duck	TV special
2017	Hey Arnold!: The Jungle Movie	Gertrude Shortman, Homeless Women	TV film
2017	VeggieTales in the City	Junior Asparagus, Laura Carrot, Madame Blueberry, Petunia Rhubarb, additional voices	Main cast
2017	Jeff & Some Aliens	Pam, Corey's Grandma, additional voices	
2017	Penn Zero: Part-Time Hero	Talon	Episode: "Alpha, Bravo, Unicorn"
2017–21	Mickey Mouse Mixed-Up Adventures	Daisy Duck, Chip, Mrs. Beagleman	Main cast
2017–23	Puppy Dog Pals	Bob's Mom, Mitzy, Kathy, additional voices	5 episodes
2018	Legend of the Three Caballeros	Daisy Duck	6 episodes
2018	The Epic Tales of Captain Underpants	Ms. Hurd, DJ Drowsy Drawers	2 episodes
2018	Wheel of Fortune	Daisy Duck	2 episodes
2018–23	Disenchantment	Queen Oona, Arch Druidess	20 episodes
2020–21	DuckTales	Daisy Duck	3 episodes
2020	Amphibia	Doris	Episode: "Scavenger Hunt"
2020–23	Animaniacs	Dot Warner, additional voices	
2020–23	The Wonderful World of Mickey Mouse	Daisy Duck	Main cast
2021–22	Mickey Mouse Funhouse	Daisy Duck, Chip	Main cast, season 1
2021	Mickey's Tale of Two Witches	Daisy Duck	TV special
2021	Mickey and Minnie Wish Upon a Christmas	Daisy Duck	TV special
2025–present	Mickey Mouse Clubhouse+	Daisy Duck, Chip	Main cast

=== Anime ===
List of dubbing performances in anime
Year	Title	Role	Notes
1992	Little Nemo: Adventures in Slumberland	Elevator creature	English dub
1998	Kiki's Delivery Service	Osono	2nd English dub
2003	The Animatrix	Housewife	English dub
2003	Castle in the Sky	Okami	English dub
2005	Nausicaä of the Valley of the Wind	Obaba	English dub
2005	My Neighbor Totoro	Miss Hara	English dub
2005	Porco Rosso	Ship Announcer	English dub
2005	My Neighbors the Yamadas	Shige	English dub
2005	Pom Poko	Oroku Baba	English dub

=== Video games ===
List of voice performances in video games
Year	Title	Role	Notes
1993	Rise of the Dragon	Karyn Sommers	
1993	Reader Rabbit's Interactive Reading Journey	Ann the Giraffe	
1995	Full Throttle	Suzi, Leader of the Vultures	
1996	Toonstruck	Fluffy Fluffy Bun Bun, Ms. Fortune, Marge, 'Mistress' Marge, Bouncer, Chipper, Sparky, Sam Shmaltz's secretary	
1996	Tiny Toon Adventures: Buster and the Beanstalk	Babs Bunny	
1997	The Simpsons: Virtual Springfield	Additional Voices	
1997	Fallout	Jain	
1997	Animaniacs Game Pack	Dot Warner	
1998	Fallout 2	Tandi	
1998	Tiny Toon Adventures: The Great Beanstalk	Babs Bunny	
1998	Animaniacs: Ten Pin Alley	Dot Warner, Hello Nurse	
1999	Animaniacs Splat Ball	Dot Warner	
1999	Winnie the Pooh Toddler	Kanga	
1999	Winnie the Pooh Preschool	Kanga	
1999	Disney's Villains' Revenge	Queen of Hearts, Mrs. Jumbo	
2000	Mickey Mouse Preschool	Daisy Duck	
2000	Mickey Mouse Kindergarten	Daisy Duck, S. Belle Guest #3, Cowgirl Guest #4	
2000	Walt Disney World Quest: Magical Racing Tour	Chip, Polly Roger, Otto Plugnut	
2000	Dinosaur: Activity Center	Baylene	
2000	Mickey Mouse Toddler	Daisy Duck	
2000	Dinosaur	Baylene	
2000	Tigger's Honey Hunt	Kanga	
2000	Mickey's Speedway USA	Daisy Duck	
2000	Donald Duck: Goin' Quackers	Daisy Duck	
Unreleased	Tiny Toon Adventures: Defenders of the Universe	Babs Bunny	
2001	The Lion King: Simba's Mighty Adventure	Shenzi	
2002	Kingdom Hearts	Daisy Duck, Chip, Queen of Hearts	
2003	Futurama		
2005	Winnie the Pooh's Rumbly Tumbly Adventure	Kanga	
2005	Animaniacs: The Great Edgar Hunt	Dot Warner, Mary Hartless	
2006	Kingdom Hearts II	Daisy Duck, Chip, Merryweather, Kanga, Shenzi	
2007	Kingdom Hearts II Final Mix+	Daisy Duck, Chip, Kanga, Merryweather	
2007	The Simpsons Game	Dolph	
2007	Bee Movie Game	Jeanette Chung	
2010	Kingdom Hearts Birth by Sleep	Chip, Merryweather	
2010	Epic Mickey	Daisy Duck	
2011	Kingdom Hearts Re:coded	Chip, Queen of Hearts	
2011	Kinect Disneyland Adventures	Daisy Duck, Chip	
2012	Epic Mickey 2: The Power of Two	Daisy Duck	
2013	Disney Magic Castle: My Happy Life	Daisy Duck, Chip	
2014	Kingdom Hearts HD 2.5 Remix	Daisy Duck, Chip, Merryweather, Kanga, Queen of Hearts	New and archived audio
2019	Kingdom Hearts III	Chip	
2023	Disney Speedstorm	Daisy Duck, Chip	
2023	Nickelodeon All-Star Brawl 2	Gertrude Shortman	

=== Live-action ===
List of acting performances in film and television
Year	Title	Role	Notes
1988	Elvira: Mistress of the Dark	Anchorwoman	
1989	Chip 'n' Dale's Excellent Adventures	Herself	TV documentary
2009	The Heart of No Place	The Art Collector	

=== Theme parks ===
List of voice performances in theme parks
Year	Title	Role	Location(s)
1986	King Kong Encounter	Kelly King	Universal Studios Hollywood
1990	Mickey's Starland Show	Chip	Magic Kingdom
1991	The Disney Afternoon Live!: Plane Crazy	Chip	Disneyland
1993	Gadget's Go Coaster	Gadget Hackwrench	Disneyland
1995	Indiana Jones Adventure	Newsreel Announcer	Disneyland
2005/2006	The Curse of Darkastle	Queen Marie	Busch Gardens Williamsburg
2011/2012	The Little Mermaid: Ariel's Undersea Adventure	Flotsam and Jetsam	Disney California Adventure/Magic Kingdom
2016	Mickey's Royal Friendship Faire	Daisy Duck	Magic Kingdom
2018	The Flintstones: Bedrock River Adventure	Wilma Flintstone	Warner Bros. World Abu Dhabi
2020/2023	Mickey & Minnie's Runaway Railway	Daisy Duck	Disney's Hollywood Studios/Disneyland
2022	Mickey's Magical Friendship Faire	Daisy Duck	Magic Kingdom

=== Music videos ===
List of voice performances in music videos
Year	Title	Role	Notes
1983	"Ricky"	Lucy	"Weird Al" Yankovic music video
2024	"Polkamania"	"Next!" lady	"Weird Al" Yankovic music video

=== Audiobooks ===
List of voice performances in audiobooks
Year	Title	Role	Notes
2014	"There Was an Old Lady Who Swallowed a Fly"	The Cat	
