= Glissade (roller coaster) =

Roller coaster

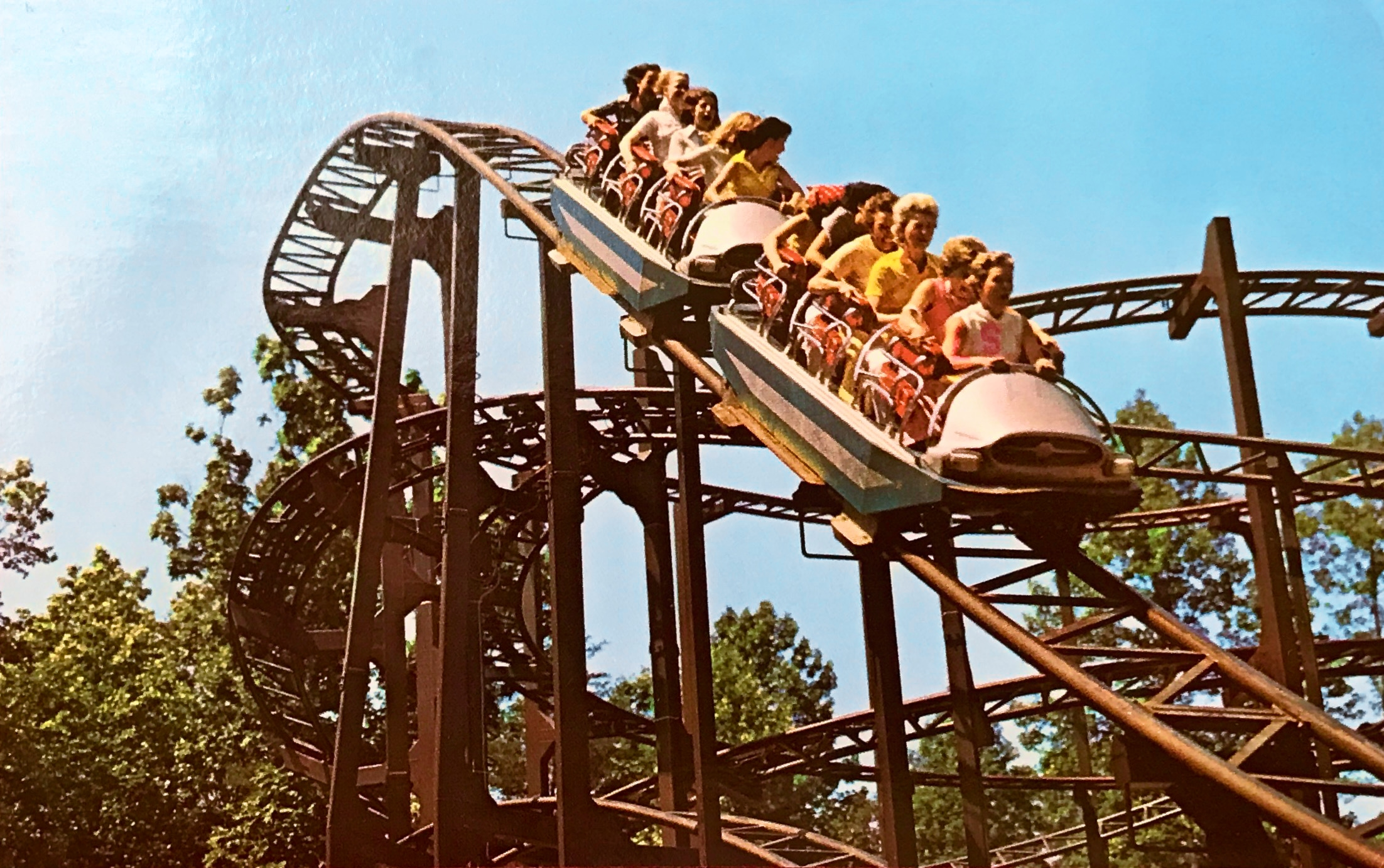

Busch Gardens Williamsburg
- Location: Busch Gardens Williamsburg
- Coordinates: 37.235°N 76.644°W
- Status: Removed
- Opening date: 1975
- Closing date: 1985

General statistics
- Type: Steel
- Manufacturer: Anton Schwarzkopf
- Model: Jet Star 3 / Jumbo Jet
- Lift/launch system: Electric Spiral Lift
- Inversions: 0
- Glissade at RCDB

Glissade was a roller coaster located at Busch Gardens Williamsburg in Virginia. It was situated in the area where Izzy/Wild Maus was once located. Glissade closed permanently in 1985 and was replaced by a subsequently defunct attraction called The Curse of DarKastle, which was in turn replaced by DarKoaster: Escape The Storm in 2023.

== Type ==
- Steel - Sit Down
- Make / Model: Schwarzkopf / All Models / Jet Star 3 / Jumbo Jet
- Designer: Ing.-Büro Stengel GmbH
- Lift / Launch System: Electric Spiral Lift

== Relocations ==
- Busch Gardens Williamsburg as Glissade
- La Feria Chapultepec Magico as Tornado
- Selva Mágica as Tornado
