= Jack and the Beanstalk =

English fairy tale

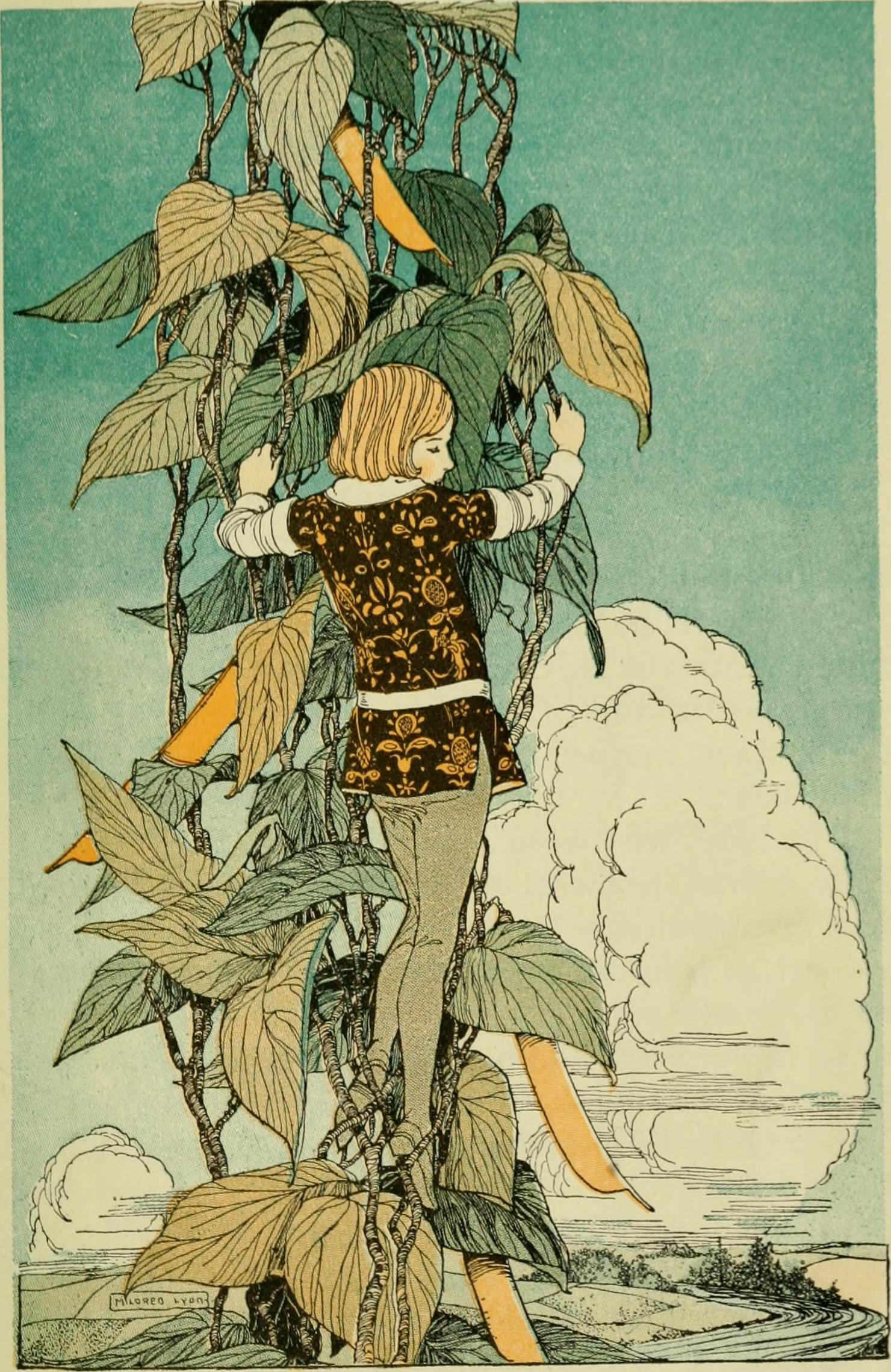
- Mildred Lyon's illustration in Charles H. Sylvester's Journeys through Bookland (1922)

Folk tale
- Name: Jack and the Beanstalk
- Also known as: Jack and the Giant man
- Aarne–Thompson grouping: AT 328 ("The Treasures of the Giant")
- Country: United Kingdom
- Published in: Benjamin Tabart, The History of Jack and the Bean-Stalk (1807); Joseph Jacobs, English Fairy Tales (1890)
- Related: "Jack the Giant Killer"

"Jack and the Beanstalk" is an English fairy tale with ancient origins. It appeared as "The Story of Jack Spriggins and the Enchanted Bean" in 1734 and as Benjamin Tabart's moralized "The History of Jack and the Bean-Stalk" in 1807. Henry Cole, publishing under pen name Felix Summerly, popularized the tale in The Home Treasury (1845), and Joseph Jacobs rewrote it in English Fairy Tales (1890). Jacobs' version is most commonly reprinted today, and is believed to be closer to the oral versions than Tabart's because it lacks the moralizing. The antagonist is an ogre in some versions, including Jacob's, and is a giant in others.

"Jack and the Beanstalk" is the best known of the "Jack tales", a series of stories featuring the archetypal English hero and stock character Jack.

According to researchers at Durham University and Universidade Nova de Lisboa, the story originated more than five millennia ago in a time that correlates with the development of Proto-Italo-Celtic and Proto-Germanic, based on a widespread archaic story form which is now classified by folklorists as ATU 328 The Boy Who Stole Ogre's Treasure.

== Story ==
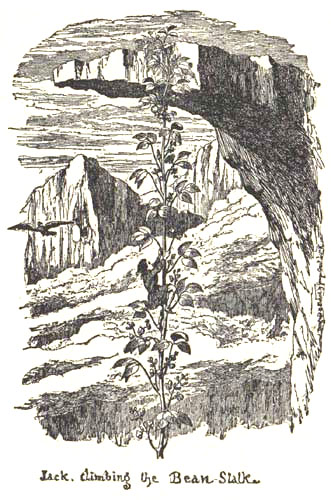
1854 illustration of Jack climbing the beanstalk by George Cruikshank

Jack, a poor country boy, trades the family cow for a handful of magic beans, much to the dismay of his widowed mother. The beans grow into a massive beanstalk reaching up into the clouds. Jack climbs the beanstalk and arrives on a land above the clouds. From the beanstalk, Jack finds a road that leads to a big house, with a great big tall woman standing outside. He asks for breakfast and she gives him some bread, cheese, and milk, but warns that he might become breakfast himself if he is not careful, since "My man is an ogre and there's nothing he likes better than boys broiled on toast." While he is eating, the ogre comes home, with the woman telling Jack to quickly hide in the oven.

Sensing the boy's presence, the ogre cries, "Fee-fi-fo-fum, I smell the blood of an Englishman. Be he alive, or be he dead, I'll have his bones to grind my bread!" The wife suggests that he is smelling "the scraps of the little boy you liked so much for yesterday's dinner". So the ogre eats his breakfast, three broiled calves. Afterwards he takes out some bags of gold. Counting the gold, he falls asleep. Jack creeps out of his hiding place, takes one of the bags, and climbs down the beanstalk. He gives the gold to his mother, who is very happy. They live well for some time, until it is almost used up.

Jack decides to try his luck once more and climbs up the beanstalk. Again he meets the woman at the doorstep and asks her for breakfast. While he is eating, the ogre returns and Jack quickly hides in the oven. Again the ogre suspects that somebody is there, but then sits down for his breakfast – three broiled oxen. Afterwards he asks his wife for "the hen that lays the golden eggs". He says "Lay!" and the hen lays an egg of pure gold. The ogre falls asleep, and Jack takes the hen and climbs down the beanstalk.

Though Jack and his mother now have an inexhaustible source of golden eggs, Jack is "not content" and climbs the beanstalk for the third time. He avoids the ogre's wife, slipping into the house unseen when she goes to get some water, and hiding in the copper. When the ogre comes home, he once more cries out "Fee-fi-fo-fum", suspecting someone is there. His wife suggests that the "little rogue that stole your gold and the hen" may be hiding in the oven. But when they find the oven empty, she concludes he is smelling the boy she has just broiled for his breakfast. The ogre eats his breakfast, then asks his wife to bring him his golden harp, which sings beautifully when he orders it to "Sing!"

Once the ogre has fallen asleep, Jack takes the harp and wants to leave, but the harp calls out "Master! Master!" The ogre wakes up, seeing Jack running away. Pursued by the ogre, he quickly climbs down the beanstalk, then asks his mother to bring an axe. He chops down the beanstalk and the ogre falls to his death. Jack and his mother are now very rich and live happily ever after, with Jack marrying a princess.

== Origins ==
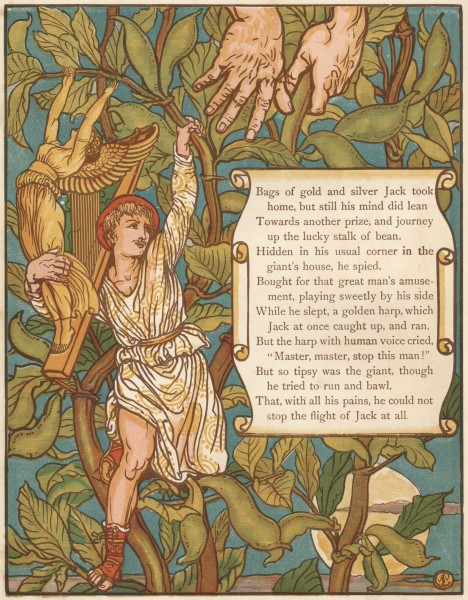
In Walter Crane's woodcut the harp reaches out to cling to the vine

"The Story of Jack Spriggins and the Enchanted Bean" was published in London by J. Roberts in the 1734 second edition of Round About Our Coal-Fire. In 1807, English writer Benjamin Tabart published The History of Jack and the Bean Stalk, possibly actually edited by William and/or Mary Jane Godwin.

The story is older than these accounts. Researchers at Durham University and the Universidade Nova de Lisboa, using statistical research that compared the evolution of languages and stories, connected the tale type (AT 328, The Boy Steals Ogre's Treasure) (to which the Jack story belongs) to prototypical Western Indo-European languages from more than 5000 years ago, when Eastern and Western Indo-European languages split.

In some versions of the tale, the giant is unnamed, but many plays based on it name him Blunderbore (one giant of that name appears in the 18th-century tale "Jack the Giant Killer"). In "The Story of Jack Spriggins" the giant is named Gogmagog.

The giant's catchphrase "Fee-fi-fo-fum! I smell the blood of an Englishman" appears in William Shakespeare's King Lear (c. 1606) in the form "Fie, foh, and fum, I smell the blood of a British man" (Act 3, Scene 4), and something similar also appears in "Jack the Giant Killer".

== Analogies ==
"Jack and the Beanstalk" is an Aarne-Thompson tale-type 328, The Treasures of the Giant, which includes the Italian "Thirteenth" and the French "How the Dragon Was Tricked" tales. Christine Goldberg argues that the Aarne-Thompson system is inadequate for the tale because the others do not include the beanstalk, which has analogies in other types

The Brothers Grimm drew an analogy between this tale and a German fairy tale, "The Devil with the Three Golden Hairs". The devil's mother or grandmother acts much like the giant's wife, a female figure protecting the child from the evil male figure.

Iona and Peter Opie (The Classic Fairy Tales 1974 p.163) saw instead parallel's with the Grimm's tale 'The Flail from Heaven'.

== Moral perspectives ==
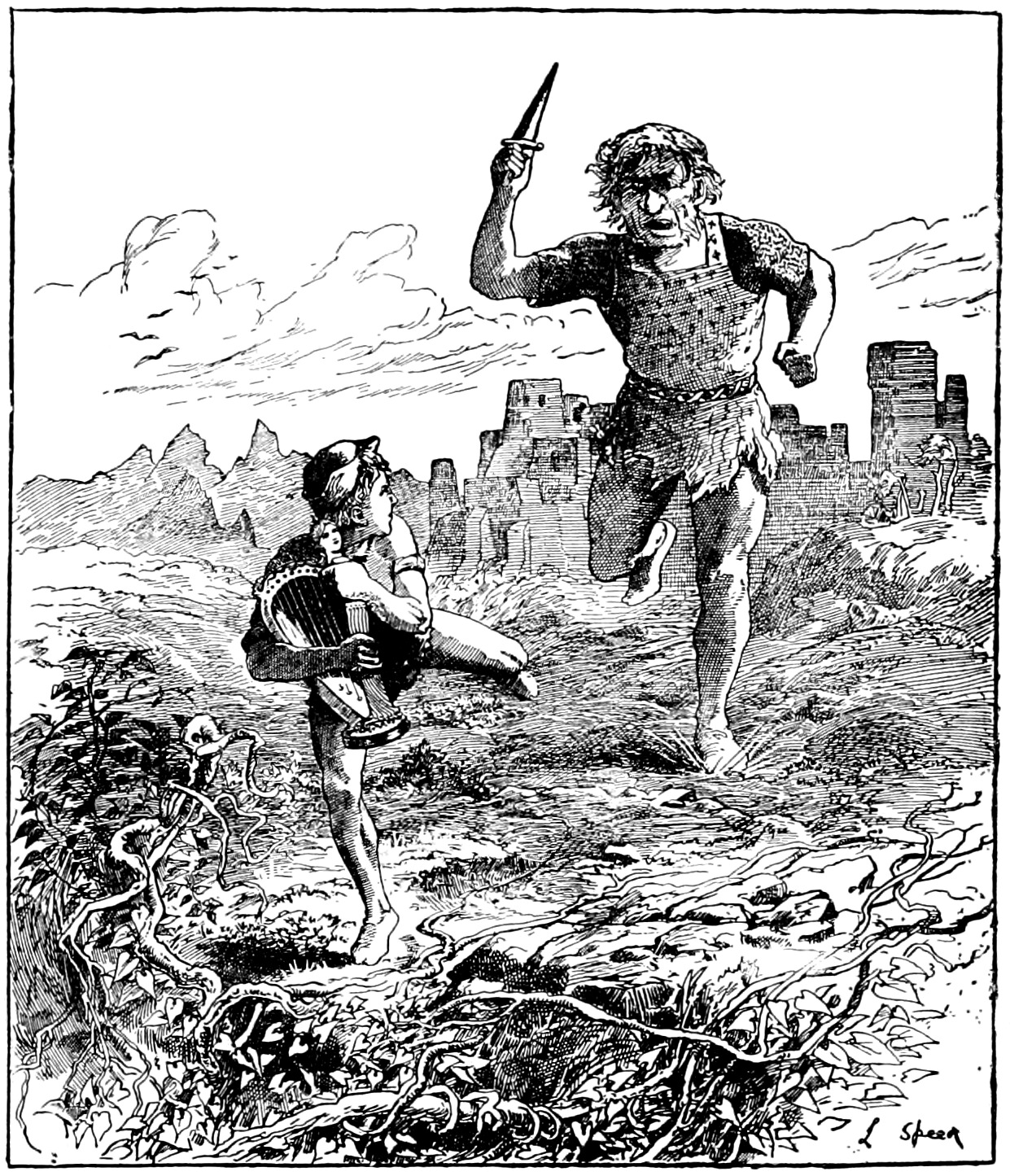
Jack running from the giant in the Red Fairy Book (1890) by Andrew Lang

The original story portrays a "hero" gaining the sympathy of a man's wife, hiding in his house, robbing him, and finally killing him. In Tabart's moralized version, a fairy woman explains to Jack that the giant had robbed and murdered his father justifying Jack's actions as retribution (Andrew Lang follows this version in the Red Fairy Book of 1890). The story published by Jacobs gives no explicit justification because there was none in the version he had heard as a child, but it has a subtle retributive tone by mentioning the giant's previous meals of stolen oxen and young children.

Many modern interpretations have followed Tabart and made the giant a villain, terrorizing smaller folk and stealing from them, so that Jack becomes a legitimate protagonist. For example, in the 1952 film starring Abbott and Costello, the giant is blamed for poverty at the foot of the beanstalk, as he has been stealing food and wealth and the hen that lays golden eggs originally belonged to Jack's family. In other versions, it is implied that the giant had stolen both the hen and the harp from Jack's father. Brian Henson's 2001 TV miniseries Jack and the Beanstalk: The Real Story not only abandons Tabart's additions but vilifies Jack, reflecting Henson's disgust at Jack's unscrupulous actions.

== Adaptations ==
=== Film and television ===
==== Live-action theatrical films ====
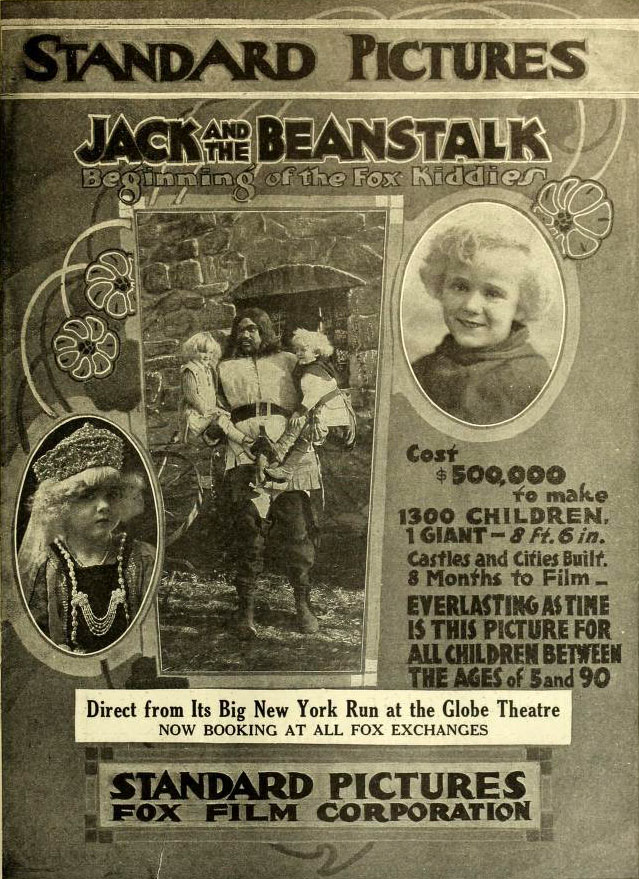
Jack and the Beanstalk (1917)

- The first film adaptation was made in 1902 by Edwin S. Porter for the Edison Manufacturing Company.
- Abbott and Costello starred in a 1952 comic retelling of the fairy tale, produced by Costello and distributed by Warner Bros.
- Michael Davis directed a 1994 adaptation, titled Beanstalk, starring J. D. Daniels as Jack and Stuart Pankin as the giant. The film was released by Moonbeam Entertainment, the children's video division of Full Moon Entertainment.
- Avalon Family Entertainment's 2009 Jack and the Beanstalk is a low-budget live-action adaptation starring Christopher Lloyd, Chevy Chase, James Earl Jones, Gilbert Gottfried, Katey Sagal, Wallace Shawn and Chloë Grace Moretz. Jack is played by Colin Ford.
- A Warner Bros. film directed by Bryan Singer and starring Nicholas Hoult as Jack is titled Jack the Giant Slayer and was released in March 2013. In this tale, which is amalgamated with "Jack the Giant Killer", Jack climbs the beanstalk to the land of Gantua to save a princess and thwart an attempted coup using a magic crown that would allow humans to control the giants.
- Jack the Giant Killer is a 2013 low-budget film adaptation from The Asylum.
- In the 2014 film Into the Woods, and the musical of the same name, one of the main characters, Jack (Daniel Huttlestone) climbs a beanstalk, much like in the original version. He acquires a golden harp, a hen that lays golden eggs, and several gold pieces. The story goes on as it does in the original fairy tale, but continues on past the "happily ever after". In this adaptation, the giant's vengeful widow (Frances de la Tour) attacks the kingdom to find and kill Jack as revenge for him murdering her husband, where some characters were killed during her rampage. The giant's wife is eventually killed by the surviving characters in the story. In the musical, she was blinded by Cinderella's bird friends and clubbed in the head by the baker and Jack. In the film, she falls to her death upon stepping in the tar pit, getting struck by birds and rocks, and tripping where she gets crushed by a tree.

==== Live-action television films and series ====
- Gilligan's Island did in 1965 an adaptation/dream sequence in the second-season episode "'V' for Vitamins" in which Gilligan as Jack tries to take oranges from the giant Skipper and fails. The part of the little Gilligan chased by the giant was played by Bob Denver's 7-year-old son Patrick Denver.
- In 1973, the story was adapted as The Goodies and the Beanstalk, in the BBC television comedy series The Goodies.
- In season 2, episode 4, aired September 8, 1983, [Shelley Duvall's] Faerie Tale Theatre made an adaptation of the story titled "Jack and the Beanstalk." It starred Dennis Christopher as Jack, Elliott Gould as the Giant, Jean Stapleton as the Giantess, Katherine Helmond as Jack's Mother, and Mark Blankfield as the Strange Little Man. It was written by Rod Ash and Mark Curtiss and directed by Lamont Johnson.
- In the Season 3 premiere 1995 episode of Barney & Friends titled "Shawn and the Beanstalk", Barney the Dinosaur and the gang tell their version of Jack and the Beanstalk, all in rhyme.
- "Beanstalks and Bad Eggs" is a 1997 episode of Hercules: The Legendary Journeys that contains elements of this story. The giant is depicted as Typhon's brother Typhoon (portrayed by Glenn Shadix).
- A season 2 (1999) episode of The Hughleys titled "Two Jacks & a Beanstalk" shows a retelling of the story where Jack Jr. (Michael, Dee Jay Daniels) buys magical beans as a means of gaining wealth and giving his family happiness and health. He and Jack Sr. (Darryl, D.L. Hughley) climb the beanstalk to see what prosperity awaits them.
- The Jim Henson Company did a TV miniseries adaptation of the story as Jim Henson's Jack and the Beanstalk: The Real Story in 2001 (directed by Brian Henson) which reveals that Jack's theft from the giant was completely unmotivated, while the giant Thunderdell (played by Bill Barretta) was a friendly, welcoming individual, and the giant's subsequent death was caused by Jack's mother cutting the beanstalk down rather than Jack himself. The film focuses on Jack's modern-day descendant Jack Robinson (played by Matthew Modine) who learns the truth after the discovery of the giant's bones and the last of the five magic beans. Jack subsequently returns the goose and harp to the giants' kingdom.
- In an episode of Tweenies (1999-2002) titled "Jake and the Beanstalk", the characters perform a pantomime based on the story with Jake as the role of Jack and Judy as the giant. The title "Jake and the Beanstalk" was also used for an episode of Jake and the Never Land Pirates.
- ABC's Once Upon a Time (2011-2018) debuts their spin on the tale in the episode "Tiny" of season 2, "Tallahassee" where Jack, here a woman named Jacqueline (known as Jack) is played by Cassidy Freeman and the giant Anton is played by Jorge Garcia. In this adaptation, Jack is portrayed as a villainous character who led an invasion on Anton's land. In season 7, a new iteration of Jack (portrayed by Nathan Parsons) is a recurring character and Henry Mills' first friend in the New Enchanted Forest. It was mentioned that he and Henry fought some giants. He debuts in "The Eighth Witch". In Hyperion Heights, he is cursed as Nick Branson who is a lawyer and Lucy's fake father. Later episodes revealed that his real name is Hansel, who is hunting witches.
- The 2020 Japanese tokusatsu series Kamen Rider Saber adopts the story as a "Wonder Ride Book" called Jackun-to-domamenoki, which is originally used by one of the protagonists, Kamen Rider Saber, but later becomes one of Kamen Rider Buster's main Wonder Ride Books.
- Episode 1165 of Mister Rogers' Neighborhood (original airdate April 2, 1971) features a marionette show of the story (replacing the usual "Neighborhood of Make Believe" segment), in which the giant was the cause of Jack's poverty, and was holding a princess prisoner. Ultimately the same carny who had sold Jack the magic beans ends up hiring the giant as a sideshow act, producing a happy ending for everybody.

==== Animated films ====
- Jack and the Beanstalk is a 1931 Fleischer Studios Talkartoon animated short film starring Bimbo and Betty Boop.
- Giantland is a 1933 animated short film produced by Walt Disney Animation Studios and distributed by United Artists. The short is the first is an adaptation of the fairy tale by Disney with Mickey Mouse in the title role. It was the 62nd Mickey Mouse short film, and the twelfth of that year.
- In 1947 Mickey and the Beanstalk was released as part of Fun and Fancy Free. This second adaptation of the story by Disney puts Mickey Mouse in the role of Jack, accompanied by Donald Duck and Goofy to rescue the Golden Harp and save Happy Valley from a giant named "Willie" in this version. This version of the fairy tale was narrated by Edgar Bergen with commentary by his dummies Charlie McCarthy and Mortimer Snerd and child actor Luana Patten in the original feature; this segment was later re-released as part of Walt Disney anthology television series and narrated first by Sterling Holloway and then by Professor Ludwig Von Drake and his best friend Herman, a bootle beetle.
- Walter Lantz produced two shorts of Woody Woodpecker based on Jack and the Beanstalk:
  - The first being Woody the Giant Killer from 1947, where Woody faces the giant to take over his castle.
  - The second being Woody and the Beanstalk from 1966, where Woody meets the giant's son who became heir to the castle after his father died chasing Jack. This short was directed by Paul Smith.
- Warner Bros. adapted the story into three Merrie Melodies cartoons.
  - Friz Freleng directed Jack-Wabbit and the Beanstalk (1943), where Bugs Bunny encounters the giant when trying to steal his giant carrots.
  - Chuck Jones directed Beanstalk Bunny (1955) where Elmer Fudd is the giant.
  - Freleng directed Tweety and the Beanstalk (1957).
- In the animated movie Puss in Boots, the classic theme appears again. The magic beans play a central role in that movie, culminating in the scene, in which its titular character, Kitty Softpaws and Humpty Alexander Dumpty ride a magic beanstalk to find the giant's castle.
- Warner Bros. Animation's direct-to-DVD film Tom and Jerry's Giant Adventure is based on the fairy tale.
- Skydance Animation is developing an animated version of Jack and the Beanstalk with former Walt Disney Animation Studios director Rich Moore attached. The project will be released directly to Netflix.

==== Foreign language animated films ====
- Gisaburo Sugii directed a feature-length anime telling of the story released in 1974, titled Jack to Mame no Ki. The film, a musical, was produced by Group TAC and released by Nippon Herald. The writers introduced a few new characters, including Jack's comic-relief dog, Crosby, and Margaret, a beautiful princess engaged to be married to the giant (named "Tulip" in this version) due to a spell being cast over her by the giant's mother (an evil witch called Madame Hecuba). Jack develops a crush on Margaret, and one of his aims in returning to the magic kingdom is to rescue her. The film was dubbed into English, with legendary voice talent Billie Lou Watt voicing Jack, and received a very limited run in U.S. theaters in 1976. It was later released on VHS (now out of print) and aired several times on HBO in the 1980s. It is now available on DVD with English or Japanese audio.

==== Animated television series ====
- The Three Stooges had their own five-minute animated retelling, titled Jack and the Beanstalk (1965).
- In 1967, Hanna-Barbera produced a live action version of Jack and the Beanstalk, with Gene Kelly as Jeremy the Peddler (who trades his magic beans for Jack's cow), Bobby Riha as Jack, Dick Beals as Jack's singing voice, Ted Cassidy as the voice of the animated giant, Janet Waldo as the voice of the animated Princess Serena, Marni Nixon as Serena's singing voice, and Marian McKnight as Jack's mother. The songs were written by Sammy Cahn and Jimmy Van Heusen. Kelly also directed the Emmy Award-winning film.
- A Hungarian variant of the tale was adapted into an episode of the Hungarian television series Magyar népmesék ("Hungarian Folk Tales") (hu) in 1977, with the title Az égig érő paszuly ("The Giant Beanstalk").
- In the PBS Kids television series Super Why! (2007-2016) the main protagonist Whyatt Beanstalk is the middle brother of the protagonist of Jack and The Beanstalk. Whyatt changes into Super Why with The Power to Read.
- In the 2016 a television adaptation of Revolting Rhymes based on Roald Dahl's modernisation of the tale was released, where Jack lives next door to Cinderella and is in love with her.

=== Pantomime ===
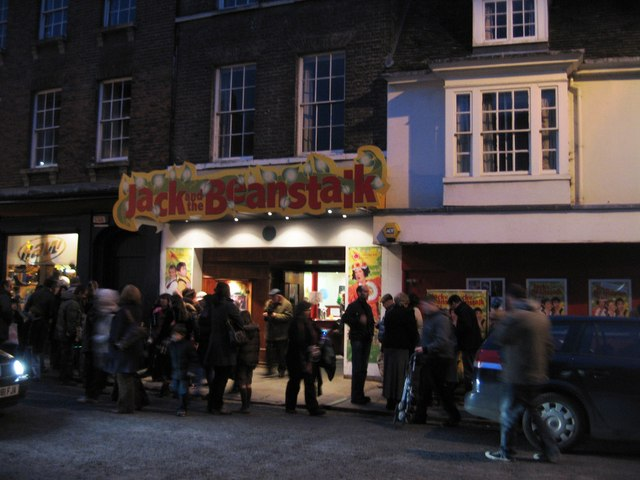
Jack and the Beanstalk pantomime showing in Cambridge, England

- The story is often performed a traditional British Christmas pantomime, wherein the Giant has a henchman, traditionally named Fleshcreep, the pantomime villain, Jack's mother is the Dame, and Jack is the Principal boy. Fleshcreep is the enemy of a fairy who helps Jack in his quest and Jack has a love interest, usually the daughter of a King, Queen, Baron or Squire, who gets kidnapped by Fleshcreep.

=== Literature ===
- Jack of Jack and the Beanstalk is the protagonist of the comic book Jack of Fables, a spin-off of Fables, which also features other elements from the story, such as giant beanstalks and giants living in the clouds. The Cloud Kingdoms first appear in issue #50 and is shown to exist in their own inter-dimensional way, being a world of their own but at the same time existing over all of the other worlds.
- Roald Dahl rewrote the story in a more modern and gruesome way in his book Revolting Rhymes (1982), where Jack initially refuses to climb the beanstalk and his mother is thus eaten when she ascends to pick the golden leaves at the top, with Jack recovering the leaves himself after having a thorough wash so that the giant cannot smell him. The story of Jack and the Beanstalk is also referenced in Dahl's The BFG, in which the evil giants are all afraid of the "giant-killer" Jack, who is said to kill giants with his fearsome beanstalk (although none of the giants appear to know how Jack uses it against them, the context of a nightmare that one of the giants has about Jack suggesting that they think that he wields the beanstalk as a weapon).
- James Still published Jack and the Wonder Beans (1977, republished 1996) an Appalachian variation on the Jack and the Beanstalk tale. Jack trades his old cow to a gypsy for three beans that are guaranteed to feed him for his entire life. It has been adapted as a play for performance by children.
- A children's book, What Jill Did While Jack Climbed the Beanstalk, was published in 2020 by Edward Zlotkowski. It takes place at the same time as Jack's adventure, but it tells the story of what his sister encounters when she ventures out to help the family and neighbors.

=== Video games ===
- An arcade video game, Jack the Giantkiller, was released by Cinematronics in 1982 and is based on the story. Players control Jack, and must retrieve a series of treasures – a harp, a sack of gold coins, a golden goose and a princess – and eventually defeat the giant by chopping down the beanstalk.
- Jumpin' Kid: Jack to Mame no Ki Monogatari was released 1990 in Japan for the Family Computer. A North American release was planned but ultimately scrapped. The game was known in Poland, Russia, and other non-NES countries via Famiclones.
- Bart Simpson plays the role of the main character in a Simpsons video game: The Simpsons: Bart & the Beanstalk.
- Tiny Toon Adventures: Buster and the Beanstalk is the only Tiny Toon Adventures-related video game released for MS-DOS and various other systems. It was developed and published by Terraglyph Interactive Studios in 1996.
- Tiny Toon Adventures: The Great Beanstalk (also known as Tiny Toon Adventures: Buster and the Beanstalk in Europe) is the first Tiny Toon Adventures game released on the PlayStation. It was developed by Terraglyph Interactive Studios and published by NewKidCo on October 27, 1998.

=== Music ===
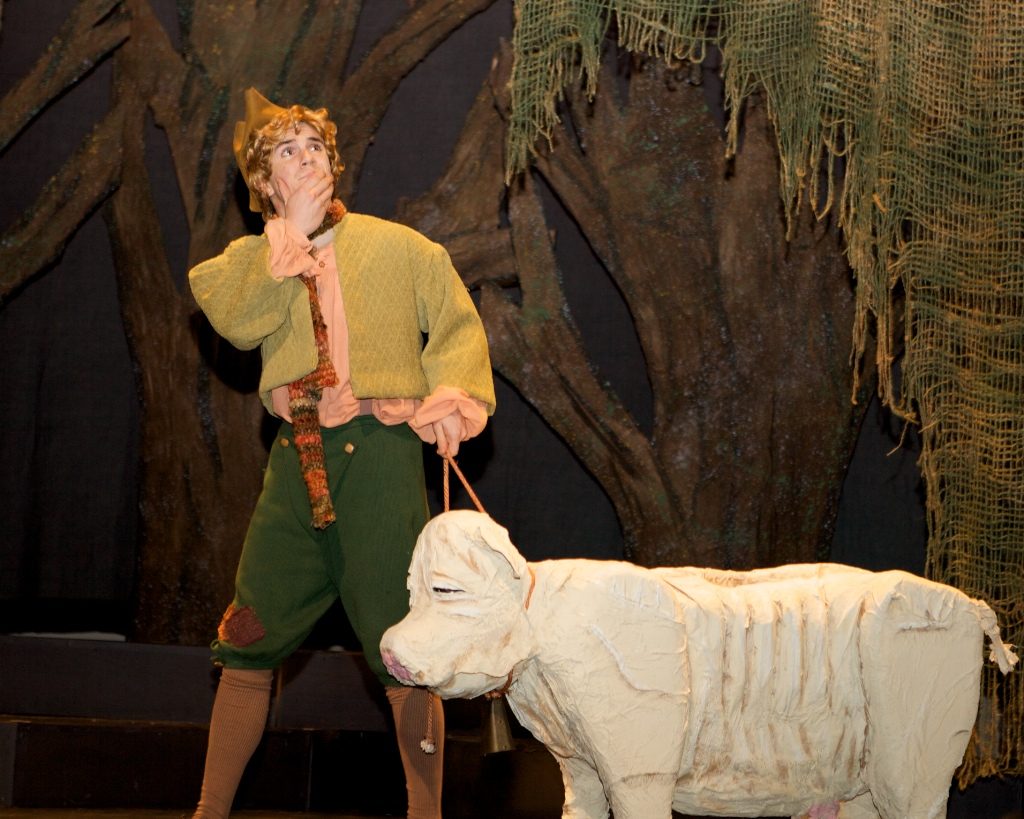
Jack and his cow, as depicted in a production of Into the Woods

- Stephen Sondheim's 1986 musical Into the Woods features Jack, originally portrayed by Ben Wright, along with several other fairy tale characters. In the second half of the musical, the giant's wife climbs down a second (inadvertently planted) beanstalk to exact revenge for her husband's death, furious at Jack's betrayal of her hospitality. The Giantess then causes the deaths of Jack's mother and other important characters before being finally killed by Jack.

== See also ==
- Child cannibalism
- "Jack the Giant Killer"
- Jacob's Ladder
- Fee, Fi, Fo, Fum, and Phooey, five mice who orbited the Moon in 1972 on Apollo 17
- Hymiskviða
- The BFG
