= Falcon's Treehouse =

American themed entertainment design company

Falcon's Creative Group
- Type: Private
- Industry: Design, CGI animation
- Founded: 2000
- Founder: Cecil Magpuri
- Headquarters: Orlando, United States
- Number of locations: 1
- Products: CircuMotion® Theater, Falcon’s Vision™, Suspended Theater®, Spheron® Theater
- Services: Theme Park Design, Water Park Design, Master Planning, Digital Media Production, VR & AR Content Creation, Sound Production
- Divisions: Treehouse, Digital Media, Licensing
- Website: falconscreativegroup.com

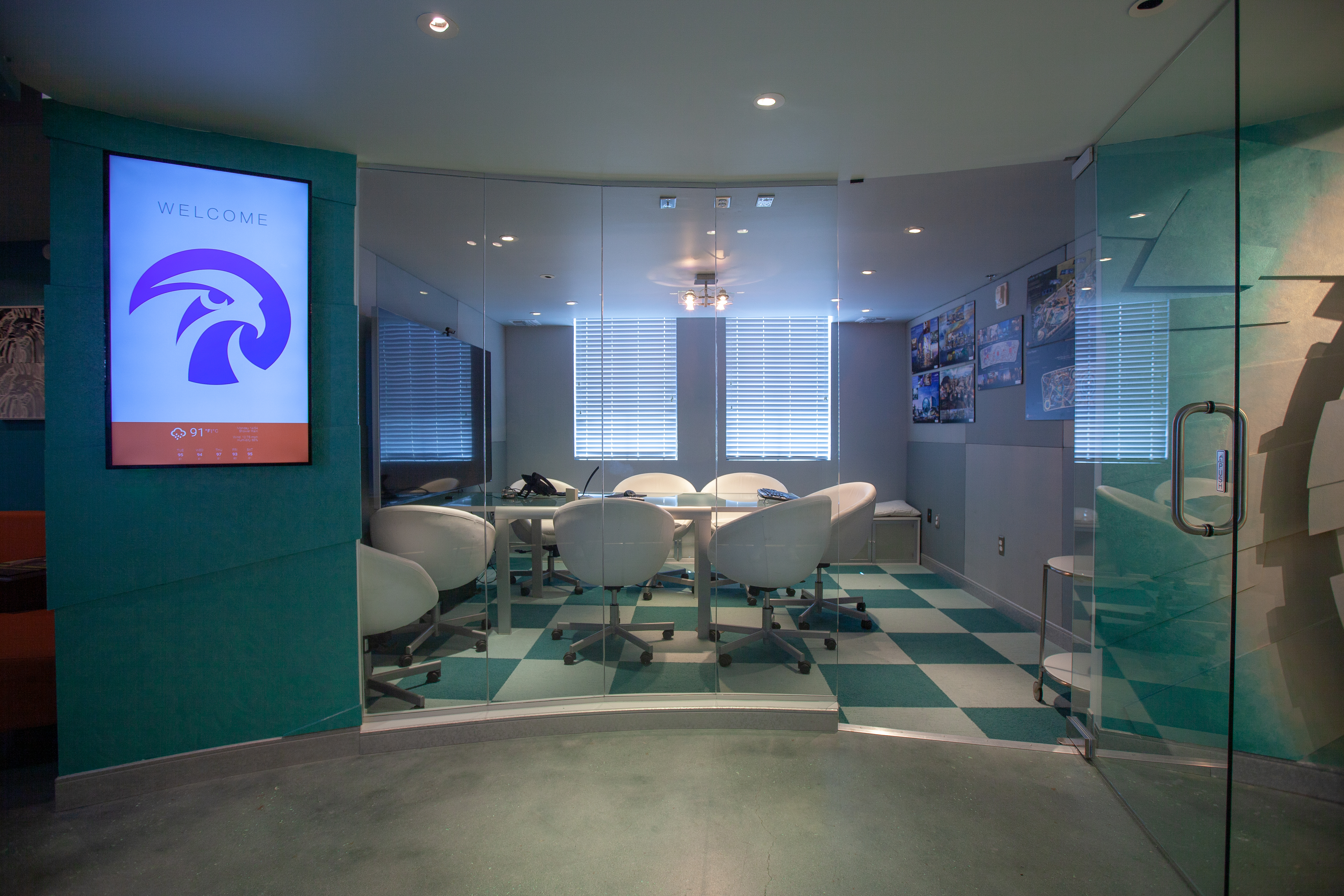
Office of Falcon's Creative Group in Orlando, Florida

Falcon's Creative Group (also known under the name Falcon's Treehouse) is an experience design and theme park design company based in Orlando, Florida. The company was founded in 2000 by Cecil D. Magpuri, the current President and Chief Creative Officer. In 2021, Falcon's Creative Group launched Falcon's Beyond Global, an overhead enterprise that combined Katmandu and their partnering IPs to bring clients to the international market space.

== History of projects ==
=== The Curse of DarKastle ===
Opening in 2005, Curse of DarKastle is a 4D dark ride found within the Oktoberfest area of Busch Gardens Williamsburg. Curse of DarKastle was designed by Falcon's Treehouse, and featured a ride-system by Oceaneering Entertainment Systems. Curse of DarKastle was named one of top 25 dark rides in the world.

=== Dragon's Treasure ===
In 2009, alongside the opening of City of Dreams Casino in Macau, two attractions designed by Falcon's Treehouse opened the Dragon's Treasure theater. Dragon's Treasure plays at "The Bubble", an immersive 360-degree dome theater. Falcon's Treehouse produced the media content for Dragon's Treasure.

=== Turtle Trek ===
Turtle Trek opened in 2012 at SeaWorld Orlando, it is a 3D dome theater, and the first in the world to show a 3D film in 360 degrees. Falcon's Treehouse provided the attraction design, and media production services for the attraction.

=== Chimelong Ocean Kingdom ===
Chimelong Ocean Kingdom opened in 2014 in Hengqin, Zhuhai, China, and Falcon's Creative Group provided attraction design and media production services for two attractions including the Ocean Avenue Media Canopy, and Deep Sea Odyssey Dark Ride. In 2015 Chimelong Ocean Kingdom won the Thea Award for Outstanding Achievement, marking the first time the award was given to a Chinese theme park.

=== IMG Worlds of Adventure ===
In 2012, it was announced that Falcon's Treehouse had been selected by the IMG Group (Ilyas & Mustafa Galadari Group) to design the attractions and overall masterplan of the upcoming IMG Worlds of Adventure theme park in Dubai. IMG Worlds of Adventure has four zones, two of which feature characters from the intellectual properties of Cartoon Network and Marvel Comics. IMG Worlds of Adventure covers an area over 1.5 million square feet, making it the largest indoor themed entertainment destination in the world.

=== Heroes and Legends featuring U.S. Astronaut Hall of Fame ===
In November 2016, "Heroes and Legends" opened and includes a 4D multisensory theater and interactive exhibits which make up a part of the new U.S. Astronaut Hall of Fame. Falcon's Creative Group was the designer, media producer and executive producer of Heroes and Legends.

=== Motiongate Dubai ===
In 2016, Falcon's Creative Group announced their involvement with the design of the Hunger Games attractions within the Lionsgate Zone at Motiongate Dubai. The attractions at the Lionsgate Zone to be opened in early 2017, are the Panem Aerial Tour and the Capitol Bullet Train.

=== National Geographic Encounter: Ocean Odyssey ===
In 2017, Falcon's Creative Group announced their involvement with the design of the National Geographic Encounter walkthrough experience being produced by SPE Partners, alongside a team of Academy Award, Grammy, and Emmy award-winning artists including Pixomondo, and David Kahne. The attraction officially opened on October 6, 2017.

=== Battle For Eire ===
Battle For Eire is a multi-sensory virtual reality motion simulator ride located in the Ireland area of the Busch Gardens Williamsburg. Falcon's Creative Group was contracted by SeaWorld Parks & Entertainment to provide a turnkey solution for all of the media and sound production throughout the attraction, as well as the virtual reality hardware.

=== Atlantis Sanya ===
In 2018, Atlantis Sanya an 'Underwater World'-inspired entertainment destination by Atlantis Resorts opened in Hainan Island. Falcon's provided thematic and interior design services as well as art direction for two of the resorts’ highly themed areas: Lost Chambers Aquarium and Aquaventure Waterpark.

=== Halo: Outpost Discovery ===
Halo: Outpost Discovery is a touring fan experience that brings the Halo video game universe to life with themed attractions and interactive in-universe encounters. Falcon's Creative Group worked closely with Herschend Live and 343 Industries and provided the narrative, story development, live-action film production, CG animation, visual effects, motion graphics, sound design, and interactive audio for a wide array of experiences throughout Halo: Outpost Discovery. The experience traveled to five different U.S. cities in 2019.

=== Becoming Jane: The Evolution of Dr. Jane Goodall ===
Falcon's Creative Group collaborated with the National Geographic Museum and the Jane Goodall Institute to provide six multimedia experiences for the “Becoming Jane: The Evolution of Dr. Jane Goodall” exhibition The exhibition immerses visitors in Jane Goodall's story of becoming the first person to live among and study wild chimpanzees, humankind's closest living relatives. The exhibition is open to the public at the National Geographic Museum from November 22, 2019, to summer 2020.

== Awards and recognition ==
=== 2013 ===
- The Gold Level Pixie Award was awarded to Sea World, San Diego's Manta.
- The Platinum Level Pixie Award was awarded to Sea World, Orlando's Turtle Trek attraction, which opened in 2012 as the world's first 360 degrees 3D Dome Theater. The attraction was designed by Falcon's Treehouse.

=== 2014 ===
- Chimelong Ocean Kingdom in China was awarded the THEA Award for Outstanding Achievement over 169 international candidates in total, marking the first time the award was given to a Chinese Theme Park.

=== 2015 ===
- The Communicator Award of Excellence was awarded to Falcon's Treehouse LLC, under the category Websites—Professional Services and Visual Appeal
- The Platinum Level Pixie Award was given to Falcon's Treehouse LLC, for the firm's involvement in the Ocean Avenue Media Canopy and Deep Sea Odyseey Attractions at Chimelong Ocean Kingdom in China. The awards were given under the category of Animation.

=== 2018 ===
- An IAAPA Brass Ring Award was presented to Falcon's Creative Group for the firm's work on National Geographic Encounter.
- National Geographic Encounter was awarded a Licensing International Excellence Award (LIMA) in the category of location-based or experiential initiative.

=== 2020 ===
- Becoming Jane: The Evolution of Dr. Jane Goodall was named an overall winner in the 32nd Annual American Alliance of Museum's Excellence in Exhibition competition.
