= Benjamin Tabart =

English publisher and bookseller

Benjamin Tabart (1767–1833) was an English publisher and bookseller of the Juvenile Library in New Bond Street, London. Many of the books in his list were written by himself. In an age of strictly moralizing children's literature, he broke ground with his fairy tales and light-hearted nursery stories and chapbook tales. His (1807) publication is the most influential version of the tale of Jack and the Beanstalk.

Tabart had for an editor Mary Jane Clairmont, the second wife of William Godwin, and maintained close professional relations with the prolific publisher, Sir Richard Phillips.

The standard bibliography of Tabart's production is Marjorie Moon, Benjamin Tabart's Juvenile Library: A Bibliography of Books for Children Published, Written, Edited and Sold by Mr. Tabart, 1801–1820. (Winchester: St Paul's Bibliographies) 1990.
