= Scooby-Doo! Classic Creep Capers =

2000 video game

- Developers: Terraglyph Interactive Studios (N64); Digital Eclipse Software (GBC)
- Publisher: THQ
- Platforms: Nintendo 64; Game Boy Color
- Release: Nintendo 64: NA: November 29, 2000; PAL: March 30, 2001; Game Boy Color: NA: February 12, 2001; PAL: March 30, 2001
- Genre: Adventure game
- Mode: Single player

Scooby-Doo! Classic Creep Capers is an adventure game published by THQ for the Nintendo 64 and Game Boy Color, based on the Hanna-Barbera cartoon Scooby-Doo, Where Are You!. The Nintendo 64 version, developed by Terraglyph Interactive Studios, was released in November 2000, while the Game Boy Color version was developed by Digital Eclipse Software, and released in February 2001. A PlayStation version, identical to the Nintendo 64 version, had been in development by Terraglyph Interactive Studios but was later cancelled.

== Gameplay ==
The Nintendo 64 game follows the Mystery Inc. investigating a crime ring run by a mysterious ghoul king through four levels. The first three levels retell three episodes of Scooby-Doo, Where Are You! ("What a Night for a Knight", "That's Snow Ghost", and "A Tiki Scare is No Fair") while the fourth is an original mystery. The player controls Shaggy and Scooby as they find clues and trap pieces to complete the levels. Velma, Fred, and Daphne assist them. When Shaggy is scared enough times, he leaves the area and the player must restart. The fright can come from simple things, such as the opening of a mummy's case, or complex dangers, such as a moving dinosaur display hitting the player. 'Courage' can be restored by finding food to eat in a cafeteria or in Scooby Snacks lying on the ground. Each room, or sometimes different sections of the same room, are presented as unmoving camera shots that the player moves through. There are hiding places in the environment that, with the right disguise, Scooby and Shaggy use to avoid being noticed.

The Game Boy Color version is a point-and-click adventure that lasts six chapters and gives the player control of all members of the gang, and is a retelling of the Scooby-Doo, Where Are You! episode "Nowhere to Hyde". In it, the Mystery Machine runs out of gas when the crew find out about a series of jewel heists with the supposed son of Dr. Jekyll, who runs Jekyll Labs, as the prime suspect. The gang goes through each area of the mansion and the lab. The player must pick up items for later use, such as a stool, a sausage, and a book with the code to get into the lab. The gang, except Shaggy and Scooby, investigates the mansion to look for clues. When Fred and Daphne see the ghost walk through a door, they go in to investigate. The ghost has vanished and Daphne is curious about a device called a "Tele-Pot," a teleporting toilet. Daphne disappears and is captured by Dr. Jekyll. Fred is worried and Velma studies the symbols in the house with the help of a book she found. She opens the door using a code from the book. Fred goes in to find Daphne and Velma decides to return the book.

== Development ==
Scooby-Doo! Classic Creep Capers was publicly announced in May 2000, with three levels that would each be based on three episodes of the original Scooby-Doo, Where Are You! series, - "What a Night for a Knight", "That's Snow Ghost", and "A Tiki Scare is No Fair" as well as a fourth level featuring an original story. At that time, a PlayStation version was in development by Terraglyph Interactive Studios, but was cancelled. Like the Nintendo 64 version, the PlayStation version also would have been based on the same three episodes of the series, as well as featuring a new story for its fourth level. The Game Boy Color version, announced in June 2000, was developed by Digital Eclipse Software, with its release date initially scheduled for fall 2000.

=== Nintendo 64 ===
The Nintendo 64 version was developed by Terraglyph Interactive Studios. Development began in late fall 1999. To ensure that the game would have a style similar to the series, the developers worked closely with Hanna-Barbera and Warner Bros., and repeatedly watched dozens of old episodes of the series. Three episodes were chosen to be adapted into the game as levels, while an original story was created by the developers to serve as the fourth level of the game. Original 2D art from Hanna-Barbera was used for the game's characters and environments. The developers faced difficulty in creating perfect 3D models of the characters, which had previously only been seen in 2D form on television. Although backgrounds on the series were simple, the developers used highly detailed environments for the game, while ensuring that they still looked like settings from the series.

Scott Innes, who was voice actor for Scooby and Shaggy at that time, provided his voice for the characters in the game. The original theme song from Scooby-Doo, Where Are You! was recreated for the game. The rest of the game's music – meant to be similar to music from the series – was created exclusively for the game. Because violence was never featured in the Scooby-Doo franchise, the game's designers had difficulty designing the gameplay in a way so that the player would have to either hide from enemies or move past them, rather than fight them. Various jokes from the series were implemented into the game. Development had concluded by October 2000, at which point the game was in Nintendo's final approval process.

== Reception ==
Reception

Aggregate scores
| Aggregator | Score |
|---|---|
| GameRankings | (GBC) 71% (N64) 59.33% |
| Metacritic | (N64) 53/100 |

Review scores
| Publication | Score |
|---|---|
| AllGame | (N64) 2.5/5 |
| Consoles + | (GBC) 78% |
| GameSpot | (GBC) 7.4/10 |
| IGN | (GBC) 7/10 (N64) 4.8/10 |
| N64 Magazine | (N64) 23% |
| Nintendo Power | (GBC) 3.5/5 (N64) 6.8/10 |
| Official Nintendo Magazine | (N64) 51% |
| Super Game Power | (N64) 9/10 |
| 64 | (N64) 78% |
| Total Game Boy | (GBC) 77/100 |

Classic Creep Capers was met with average to mixed reception upon release. GameRankings and Metacritic gave it a score of 71% for the Game Boy Color version, and 59.33% and 53 out of 100 for the Nintendo 64 version.

AllGame journalist Tom Carroll described the "Scooby Shake", the scared character animation Scooby and Shaggy do while still, as "wearying after only a few instances". He also criticized Scooby as distracting to the player, especially during chases or attempts to collect items. While stating the game may appeal to Scooby-Doo fans, he also argued the gameplay lacked suspense and could be finished quickly due to clues and payoffs that were "so obvious". Official Nintendo Magazine similarly argued the characters analyze from the clues, rather than challenging the player to do so.

Mark Green of N64 Magazine exclaimed that Scooby-Doo! Classic Creep Capers was "overflowing with inexcusable design faults that'll soon have you tearing the cart apart with your bare hands", and called it "devoid of gameplay".

IGN gave the N64 version a score of 4.8 out of 10 overall. The sound was criticized for a lack of authentic voice-overs and the graphics were blurry on the low resolution screen. However, IGN gave the GBC version a warmer review, rating it 7 out of 10.

A major criticism was the movement control, particularly its relation to an abruptly-altering camera angle. If the player holds the analog stick and the camera angle switches while the character moves, the direction will still relate to the previous angle until the player releases it; this can result in players unexpectedly moving the opposite of the intended way. As a result, reviewers reported losing orientation, accidentally going back to a room they just exited, and chases from enemies being artificially difficult.

Sources such as Super GamePower and Official Nintendo Magazine were positive towards the graphics, such as the detailed backgrounds, character representations, and faithfulness to the source material, particularly the use of "Zoinks", "Jinkles", and Scooby's barks in the text. Super GamePower was also intrigued by the mysteries and appreciated the use of a fear meter as a life bar.

Official Nintendo Magazine was less forgiving towards the audio, "rubbish" music, irritating sound effects, and a lack of voices from the show.
