= Duck Ugly =

2000 French animated film

- French: Couac, le vilain petit canard
- Directed by: Deane Taylor; Emmanuel Klotz
- Written by: Deane Taylor
- Screenplay by: Deane Taylor; Paul Morris; Fred Louf
- Production company: Millimages
- Release date: 2000
- Running time: 65 minutes
- Countries: France; Ireland
- Language: French

Duck Ugly (Couac, le vilain petit canard in French) is a 2000 French animated film co-produced by Millimages, TerraGlyph Productions, Ireland and Moro Studios, Barcelona. It was directed by Deane Taylor and Emmanuel Klotz.

The film is based on the fairy tale The Ugly Duckling by Hans Christian Andersen.

== Cast ==
- Hélène Bizot as Couac (Duck Ugly)
- Gilles Coiffard as Ramuncho (in the French version) and as Maurice (in the English version)

=== English cast ===
- Barbara Scaff as Duck Ugly
- Kim Broderick as Ladybird
- David Gasman as Simon
- Mike Marshall as Crooked Man
- Leslie Clack as Harry
- Helen Later as Trotsky
- Joe Sheridan as Hamlet
