= Hélène Bizot =

French actress

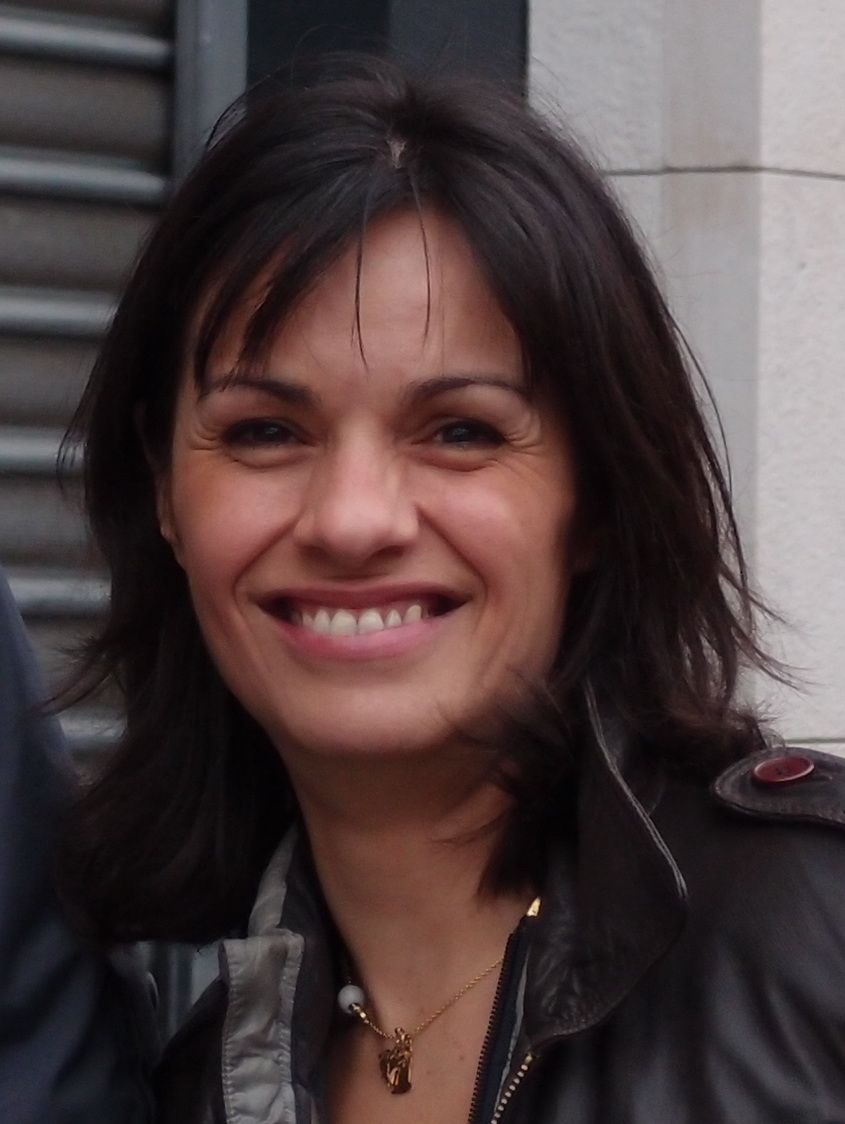
Hélène Bizot

Hélène Bizot is a French film, stage and voice actress.

She is the regular dubbing voice of Naomi Watts, Rachael Taylor and sometimes Charlize Theron.

== Roles as a voice actress ==
- 1998: Serial Experiments Lain (as Lain Iwakura)
- 1999: GTO (as Tomoko)
- 2000: Duck Ugly (as Duck Ugly)
- 2001: Noir (as Kirika Yuumura)
- 2001: Sakura Wars: The Movie (as Sakura Shinguji)
- 2002: Ghost in the Shell: Stand Alone Complex (as Motoko Kusanagi)
- 2003: Fullmetal Alchemist (as Izumi Curtis)
- 2004: Appleseed (as Deunan Knute)
- 2005: Ghost in the Shell: S.A.C. 2nd GIG (as Motoko Kusanagi)
- 2006: Ghost in the Shell: Stand Alone Complex - Solid State Society (as Motoko Kusanagi)
- 2006: Submarine Super 99 (as Ze Stroger, Yana)
- 2006: The Girl Who Leapt Through Time (as Makoto Konno)
- 2006: Nocturna, la Nuit Magique (as Tim, l'Étoile)
- 2006: Splinter cell double agent (as Enrica Villablanca)
- 2007: Ghost in the Shell: S.A.C. - The Laughing Man (as Motoko Kusanagi)
- 2007: Fullmetal Alchemist the Movie: Conqueror of Shamballa (as Izumi Curtis, Lyra, Dietlinde)
- 2014: Watch Dogs (as Clara Lille)
- 2014: The Elder Scrolls Online (as various characters)
- 2015: The Witcher 3 : The Wild Hunt (as Keira Metz)
- 2016: Raibow Six: Siege (as Mira)

== Roles as a stage actress ==
- 1997: Sacré Georges !
- 1998: La Jalousie de Barbouille
- 2006: Un Héritage pour Deux
- 2007: Fin de Terre (as Annia)
- 2008: La Perruche et le Poulet (as Suzanne)

== Roles as an actress ==
- 1999: Walking in my Father's Footsteps (French: Je Règle Mon Pas sur le pas de mon père)
- 2002: Groupe Flag (TV series - two episodes as Julie)
- 2003: Poulet Cocotte
- 2007: La Taupe (TV)
- 2007: La Légende des 3 Clefs (TV)
