= Turtle Trek =

Former film projection at Seaworld Orlando

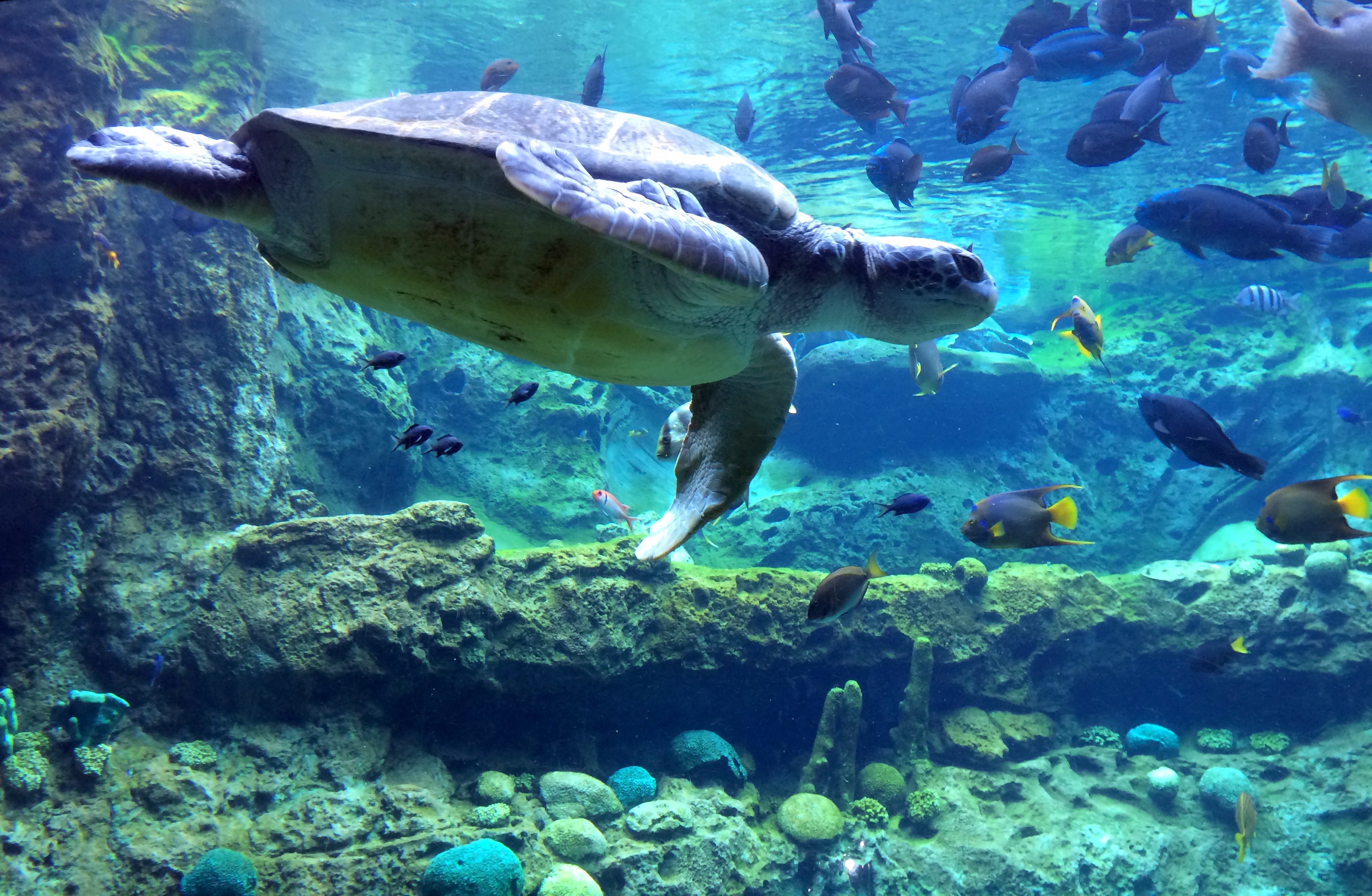
- A sea turtle swims in the Turtle Trek exhibit

SeaWorld Orlando
- Coordinates: 28°24′50.03″N 81°27′34.92″W
- Status: Closed
- Opening date: April 27, 2012
- Closing date: March 2020
- Replaced by: SeaWorld Rescue Center

Ride statistics
- Manufacturer: Falcon's Treehouse
- Designer: Falcon's Treehouse
- Model: Spheron Theater
- Capacity: 900-1000 riders per hour
- Duration: 7:00

Turtle Trek was a 3D dome film projection theater located at SeaWorld Orlando in Orlando, Florida. It was designed by Falcon's Treehouse and PGAV Destinations. It opened on April 27, 2012 as part of a large expansion project. It closed in March 2020.

== Summary ==
Guests first viewed two animal exhibits, one showcasing West Indian manatees and several species of freshwater fish, the other home to more than 1,500 saltwater fish and over a dozen sea turtles. Many of the manatees and sea turtles were rescued by the park's animal team or were born at the park.

Guests then entered a domed theater. Turtle Trek's theater was the world's first 360 degree dome theater to show a 3D film. The theater used 34 projectors to seamlessly cover the entire surface of the dome, allowing the movie to be shown all around guests, including above them. Turtle Trek tells the story of a sea turtle's journey through life, from birth to adulthood. Guests are given a turtle's perspective of the ocean.

After exiting the theater, the path led guests to the end of the experience, where they viewed more habitats. An exhibit for juvenile American alligators was located beside the attraction.

Turtle Trek was meant to inspire guests to get involved with the conservation of natural environments. "Do a little, do a lot, but join us and do something to help the world and its animals", said Brian Morrow, the attraction's chief designer, regarding the attraction's message. "Turtle Trek is about the everyday heroes who can make a difference in nature."

== History ==
On May 31, 1993, the pre-show manatee exhibit opened as Manatees: The Last Generation?, and was later renamed Manatee Rescue. The habitat contained 300,000 gallons of water in a 3-1/2 acre lagoon. The lagoon also contained birds, turtles, and fish native to the state of Florida. It used film, graphics, and hands-on displays to help visitors learn about manatees.

In November 2011, Turtle Trek was announced. In December 2011, the exhibit closed for renovations relating to Turtle Trek. Sea turtles were moved from the nearby Turtle Point (now Pelican Preserve) to the manatee exhibit, and the lagoon was separated into two sections for the manatees and the sea turtles.

The exhibit reopened as Turtle Trek on April 27, 2012, in the Key West (now Sea of Shallows) section of the park. The attraction included original music.

Due to the COVID-19 pandemic, the 3D glasses offered for the film were removed, and the film was updated to be viewable in 2D.

In late 2022, after being shuttered since 2020, the attraction's facade was dismantled, its entrance was blocked off, and it was removed from the park website's list of available attractions.

During the Inside Look event in 2023, SeaWorld Rescue Center reopened on the site of Turtle Trek, sporting an updated interior and exterior presentation. In June 2023, the former theater reopened as the SeaWorld Coral Rescue Center, containing tanks with various coral colonies and coral biologists on hand to interact with.

== See also ==
- SeaWorld
