= Manta (SeaWorld San Diego) =

Roller coaster

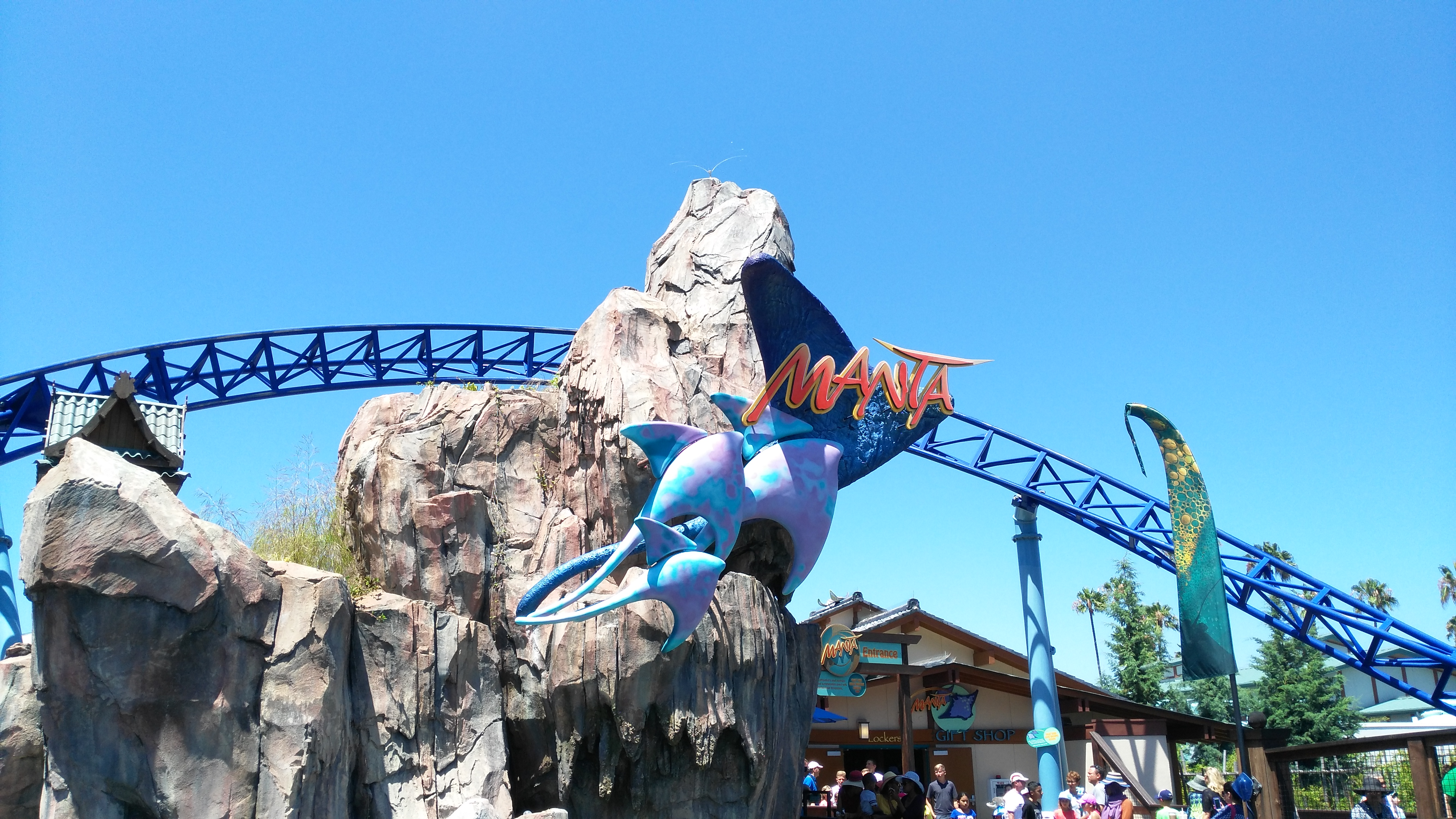
- The entrance.

SeaWorld San Diego
- Location: SeaWorld San Diego
- Coordinates: 32.767063°N 117.227998°W
- Status: Operating
- Soft opening date: May 23, 2012
- Opening date: May 26, 2012

General statistics
- Type: Steel – Launched – Family
- Manufacturer: Mack Rides
- Designer: PGAV Destinations
- Lift/launch system: LSM
- Height: 30 ft (9.1 m)
- Drop: 54 ft (16 m)
- Length: 2,800 ft (850 m)
- Speed: 43 mph (69 km/h)
- Inversions: 0
- Duration: 1:56
- Capacity: 1400 riders per hour
- G-force: Between 3 and 4 Gs
- Height restriction: 48 in (122 cm)
- Trains: 4 trains with 5 cars. Riders are arranged 2 across in 2 rows for a total of 20 riders per train.
- Quick Queue available
- Manta at RCDB

Manta is a steel launched roller coaster at SeaWorld in San Diego, California, United States. The ride was manufactured by MACK Rides and opened to the public on May 26, 2012. It utilizes the same ride system that was used in Blue Fire which opened in 2009 at Europa-Park.

== History ==
Rumors about a new roller coaster for SeaWorld San Diego date back to mid October 2007 when details of a possible 2010 project were leaked. This plan was canceled in mid-2008. In early January 2011, construction documents were discovered which detailed the plans for a $10 million manta ray-themed ride and animal exhibit due to open in 2012. On February 9, 2011, SeaWorld San Diego announced that they would be opening a Mack launched roller coaster called Manta in 2012.

In late 2018, SeaWorld San Diego premiered a Christmas overlay of the attraction called Merry Manta. The first launch area would feature holiday music and dynamic lightning that created three different shows. Riders would also twist through a sea of glowing Christmas trees while the cool holiday air rushed by.

== Ride ==
Manta features two launches. Riders reach speeds of up to 43 miles per hour (69 km/h) on the two-minute, 2,800-foot (850 m) long ride. The ride stands at a height of 30 feet (9.1 m) and features a drop including an underground portion of 54 feet (16 m). The limited height was required due to height restrictions in place by the California Coastal Commission.

=== Trains ===
Manta's four trains each feature manta ray shaped fronts. The 5-car trains each seat riders 2 across in 2 rows for a total of 20 riders per train. There is also elevated seating for the second row of each car.

=== Media ===
Manta begins with a 270 degree projected media experience at the first launch. The train rocks forward and backward in synchronization with the projected film of a coral reef and school of rays. The media tunnel and film was produced by Falcon's Treehouse. For Electric Ocean, Manta changes after 7PM to Manta re-charged. The film projection for Manta re-charged features an array of colored lights projected on the screen. Various versions of this launch re-purpose Rick McKee's soundtrack from the Mako coaster at SeaWorld Orlando.

== Animal exhibit ==
The previously existing Forbidden Reef exhibit was incorporated into the attraction, featuring a touch pool above and an aquarium below The 100,000-US-gallon (380,000 L) exhibit features 65 Bat rays, 10 Shovelnose guitarfish, 2 White sturgeons and more than 400 other fish.

== See also ==
- 2012 in amusement parks
- Manta (SeaWorld Orlando)
- Texas Stingray (SeaWorld San Antonio)
