= DarKoaster: Escape The Storm =

Indoor roller coaster at Busch Gardens Williamsburg

DarKoaster
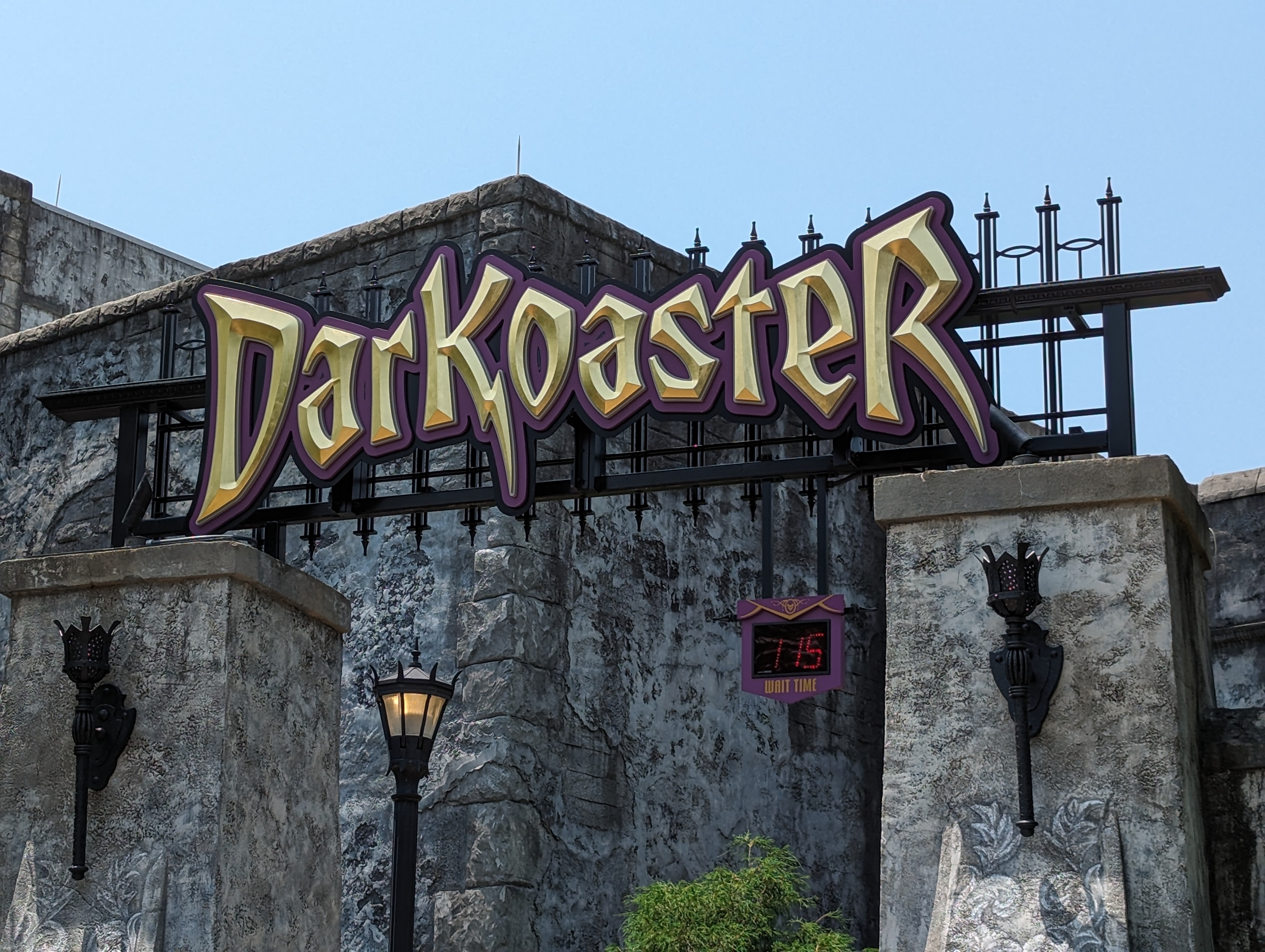

Busch Gardens Williamsburg
- Location: Busch Gardens Williamsburg
- Park section: Oktoberfest
- Coordinates: 37.232038°N 76.647045°W
- Status: Operating
- Opening date: May 19, 2023
- Replaced: Curse of DarKastle

General statistics
- Type: Steel – Launched – Motorbike
- Manufacturer: Intamin
- Model: Family Launch Coaster
- Lift/launch system: Drive Tire Launch System
- Length: 2,454 ft (748 m)
- Speed: 36 mph (58 km/h)
- Inversions: 0
- Capacity: 600 riders per hour
- Height restriction: 48–77 in (122–196 cm)
- Trains: 2 trains with 5 cars. Riders are arranged 2 across in a single row for a total of 10 riders per train.
- Website: Official site
- Quick Queue available
- DarKoaster at RCDB

DarKoaster (also billed as DarKoaster: Escape The Storm) is an indoor launched roller coaster located at Busch Gardens Williamsburg in James City County near Williamsburg, Virginia, United States. It replaced the former Curse of DarKastle attraction, with the ride experience building on its predecessor's storyline and reusing its building. DarKoaster opened on May 19, 2023.

== History ==
=== Background ===
Curse of DarKastle was a dark ride that opened as a part of the park's Oktoberfest area in 2005. The attraction closed on January 23, 2018, ostensibly to house a new Howl-O-Scream haunted house named "FrostBite". DarKastle's closure was assumed to be temporary by many; however, the ride failed to reopen after the event and was instead re-utilized for a Christmas Market. When interviewed in November, the park's Vice President of Marketing, Dan Dipiazzo, admitted that the attraction was still operable, but the park still needed to decide on its return. On January 24, 2018, Busch Gardens officially announced that Curse of DarKastle had been retired after 13 years of operation and subsequently reused its building for a new event space.

Three years later, Busch Gardens Williamsburg handled various ongoing projects as part of SeaWorld Entertainment's heightened capital investment strategy. Pantheon – a major new launched coaster supplied by Intamin – had been completed but wouldn't open until after the COVID-19 pandemic had subsided. For similar reasons, development on a proposed 355-foot (108 m) tall coaster dubbed "Drachen Spire" had also been put on hold. In May 2021, the park filed plans to build a major storage and event facility near Festhaus Park, somewhat rendering DarKastle's building obsolete as a warehouse.

=== Development ===
In December 2021, local fansite BGWFans published an exposé on the under-development coaster project, using city permits to reveal the attraction's layout and nature. Dubbed "Darkoaster", the coaster would utilize DarKastle's show building and use a switch track function to allow trains to navigate the compact layout twice; instead of proceeding back to the station upon completion, the coaster would instead access a bypass route after the first lap and cycle through the course a second time.

Track and supports for the coaster first arrived in late May/early June 2022. Due to the project's size and installation inside the existing building, construction remained discreet throughout the summer as crews assembled the ride indoors.

=== Announcement & preparation ===
Busch Gardens officially announced DarKoaster: Escape The Storm on September 6, 2022, a "straddle-seated" coaster that was at the time billed as the world's first "all-indoor straddle coaster" – this was later revised to a "North American first". In addition, the park revealed the completed roller coaster to the media, with thematic work yet to take place.

Busch Gardens continued to engage the public throughout the following months with DarKoaster's progress. During select weekends in February and March, the park hosted a "Preview Center", allowing guests to view the attraction's storyboards, blueprints, and artwork. In March, fans were polled through social media on the names of DarKoaster's two trains, with all four options being callbacks to the former Curse of DarKastle.

== Characteristics ==
=== Layout ===
DarKoaster's physical layout primarily contains two Drive Tire Launches and a handful of twists. The station is located at one end of the building and between the theoretical beginning and end of the layout. However, a pair of switch tracks lead to a bypass route in parallel with the station platform, allowing the coaster to skip past the station after its first lap and complete the layout a second time.

=== Statistics ===
Contained inside of the building, DarKoaster traverses a total track length of 2,454 feet (748 m) and reaches a top speed of 36 mph (58 km/h). The coaster runs a pair of 10-passenger, straddle-seated trains, which seat riders in five rows of two and are respectively named Wild Wolf 9684 and FrostBite 17-19.

=== Theme ===
DarKoaster builds upon the storyline of Curse of DarKastle, with riders traveling through King Ludwig's abandoned fortress and encountering a supernatural force. The extensive theming and special effects have been designed by Holovis, a media and design firm that had also worked on show scenes for Mystic Timbers at Kings Island and Wicker Man at Alton Towers.
