= National Geographic Encounter =

National Geographic Encounter, also known as Ocean Odyssey due to its inaugural exhibit, Times Square was an exploration of the oceans attraction operated under license from National Geographic. It was located in the former printing area of what once was The Times Square Building, leased from the Kushner Companies. It was operated in partnership with SPE Partners and Times Square Attractions Live.

The 60,000 square foot space made use of technology to create a virtual ocean experience. Among the sources for the content were more than one thousand original photographs of the Solomon Islands.

The museum did not reopen following its closure due to COVID-19.
