= Tiny Toon Adventures: The Great Beanstalk =

1998 video game

- Original Cover
- Developer: Terraglyph Interactive Studios
- Publishers: NA: NewKidCo; EU: Sony Computer Entertainment
- Series: Tiny Toon Adventures
- Platform: PlayStation
- Release: NA: November 18, 1998; EU: November 5, 1999
- Genre: Adventure
- Mode: Single-player

Tiny Toon Adventures: The Great Beanstalk (known as Tiny Toon Adventures: Buster and the Beanstalk in Europe) is an adventure video game developed by Terraglyph Interactive Studios and published by NewKidCo for the PlayStation. It is based on the television series Tiny Toon Adventures.

== Gameplay ==
Inspired by the fairy story Jack and the Beanstalk, Plucky Duck and Buster Bunny have found the Great Beanstalk. The player takes control of Plucky Duck, who is following Buster Bunny as they climb the beanstalk and explore the areas above.

== Development ==
The game was announced at E3 1998.

== See More ==
Next Game: Tiny Toon Adventures: Buster Saves the Day
