= Terraglyph Interactive Studios =

Defunct video game studio

- Industry: Feature Animation, Entertainment, Video games
- Founder: Donald F. Flynn
- Headquarters: United States
- Key people: Donald F. Flynn; Brian J. Flynn; Patrick M. Daleiden

TerraGlyph Interactive Studios was a multi-platform game development studio located in Schaumburg, Illinois, and was founded in 1994. The company was the game development division of the TerraGlyph group of companies, which also includes a feature animation studio in Dublin, Ireland; a web/media services division; and a business visualization company, both located near Chicago, Illinois.

Terraglyph's main product line consisted of rendered CD-ROM-based children's games. Originally, their concept was to create several edutainment games based on classic fairy tales such as Hansel and Gretel that were both fun to play as well as developed in five different languages for kids to learn new languages as they played. Later, their game development included popular licensed titles such as Kidsongs and Tiny Toon Adventures.

== Games published ==
Win95/Mac/MS-DOS

- Hansel & Gretel and the Enchanted Castle (1995)
- Rumpelstiltskin's Labyrinth of the Lost (1995)
- Tiny Toon Adventures: Buster and the Beanstalk
- Kidsongs Musical Mystery
- Beowulf (99% finished)
- Scooby-Doo! Showdown in Ghost Town

PlayStation

- Tiny Toon Adventures: Toonenstein
- Tiny Toon Adventures: The Great Beanstalk
- Blue's Big Musical

Nintendo 64

- Scooby-Doo! Classic Creep Capers
- Carnivalé: Cenzo's Adventure (cancelled)

== Animated films (TerraGlyph Productions Dublin) ==
- Help! I'm a Fish (2000)
- Carnivale (2000)
- Duck Ugly (2000)
- Wilde Stories (2003) (Oscar Wilde short stories for Channel 4)
