= Tiny Toon Adventures: Buster and the Beanstalk =

1996 video game

- Developer: Terraglyph Interactive Studios
- Publisher: Terraglyph Interactive Studios
- Platforms: MS-DOS; Mac OS; Windows
- Release: March 1996
- Genre: Point-and-click
- Mode: Single-player

Tiny Toon Adventures: Buster and the Beanstalk a 1996 Tiny Toon Adventures-related video game developed and published by Terraglyph Interactive Studios. It is for ages 3 to 9.

== Gameplay ==
Buster and the Beanstalk is a children's game set in a traditional fairy‑tale environment featuring Tiny Toon characters. Players control Buster Bunny and Plucky Duck as they travel up a beanstalk toward a giant's castle to recover stolen belongings. Gameplay proceeds under a time limit, with players moving through nine themed rooms. In each room, players search for items that contribute to building a key needed to enter the giant's lair. When an item is found, the game provides a clue indicating where the next item can be located. Players can choose between two difficulty levels, and throughout the game Babs Bunny appears to guide players with simple directions.

== Development ==
Tiny Toon Adventures: Buster and the Beanstalk was localized by Funsoft in Europe. It was released in March 1996.

== Reception ==
Reception

Review score
Publication	Score
The Philadelphia Inquirer	3.5/5

Billboard praised the game's humor, saying that it was smart enough "to keep parents from pulling their hair out." The Philadelphia Inquirer called it an exceptional example of how to make a kids game that is entertaining.

Tiny Toon Adventures: Buster and the Beanstalk won a Silver Invision Award for Best Children's Title by New Media magazine in 1996.
