= Curse of DarKastle =

Former dark ride

Busch Gardens Williamsburg
- Area: Oktoberfest
- Coordinates: 37°14′5″N 76°38′40″W
- Status: Removed
- Opening date: May 1, 2005
- Closing date: January 23, 2018
- Replaced: Wild Maus
- Replaced by: DarKoaster: Escape The Storm

Ride statistics
- Manufacturer: Oceaneering
- Designer: Falcon's Treehouse
- Length: 1,000 ft (300 m)
- Capacity: 1,450 riders per hour
- Duration: 3:20
- Height restriction: 42 in (107 cm)
- Quick Queue was available

Curse of DarKastle was a dark ride located at Busch Gardens Williamsburg in Williamsburg, Virginia. It was a hybrid dark ride which combined roving motion-simulating vehicles, 3D projection animation, physical sets, in-vehicle audio, and special effects (wind, water, fog, and lighting). Curse of DarKastle carried a rider height requirement of 42 inches, but with a sign warning that scenes within the attraction may be too intense for young audiences. The ride took place in an abandoned Bavarian castle, haunted by evil ghosts and a demonic werewolf.

The attraction closed on September 4, 2017, to make room for a new Howl-O-Scream haunted house named "FrostBite". It was assumed that the ride would return after the end of the event, however, plans were announced to utilize portions of the attraction’s space for a Christmas themed event. In an interview with the park’s Vice President of Marketing, Dan Dipiazzo, it was discovered that returning the attraction to operational status was undetermined. Dipiazzo confirmed that, as of late 2017, the attraction was still operable. However, due to high maintenance and operating costs, low ridership, and ongoing budget cuts at Busch Gardens' parent company SeaWorld Parks and Entertainment, the ride was officially announced as closed on January 23, 2018. The building became a special events space themed to a fictional German castle in 2018, with much of the gothic theming removed from the exterior and interior.

On September 6, 2022, Busch Gardens Williamsburg announced that a new, multi-launch coaster named DarKoaster would open within the existing structure during 2023.

== Ride experience ==
=== Queue ===
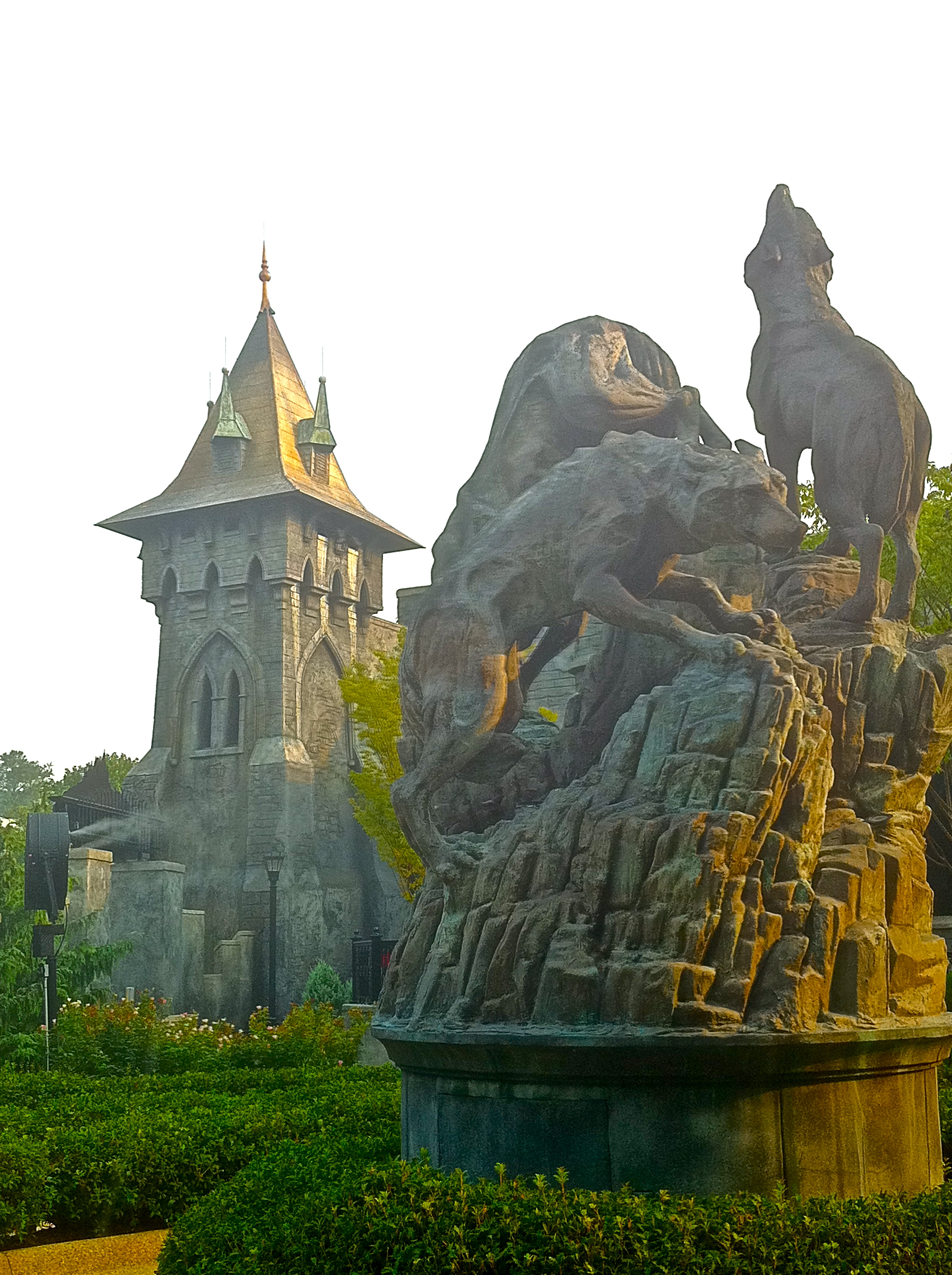
The ride's outdoor queue with castle turrets and wolf statue at sunset.

The queue line for Curse of DarKastle was entered under a frozen, crumbling arch under the Bavarian castle's highest tower, two wolf statues were standing at the end of the arch. It then weaved throughout the outdoor courtyard of the castle. The line weaved around a statue of three howling wolves covered in ice and aged as copper. As guests entered in the hallways within the palace, flickering candelabras lit the way into a large, circular stone chamber in which the preshow was projected using simple animation as a heavily accented voice told the tale of the castle's haunted past:

Long ago in the deepest heart of the black forest, a young prince lived, unloved and neglected in a dark castle. Like the ghostly horrors that always grow in secret shadows, Prince Ludwig grew to be a troubled child. Soon, even the kindest of servants avoided his evil gaze. One dark winter's night, as Ludwig wandered the lonely, frozen grounds of the castle, an old woman appeared. Outraged at this intrusion, Ludwig howled in fury! There, in her place, stood a snarling wolf. As her angry yellow eyes bored into Ludwig's, she revealed his dark destiny: Wicked ruler of a corrupt kingdom. Guided by the wolf, Ludwig set out to take the throne. His parents tried to put an end to his ruthless ambitions, but they mysteriously vanished.

Mad Ludwig became King, and transformed the castle into an impenetrable fortress with secret passageways to terrify his guests. Soon, the treasury was empty. Ludwig's advisers tried to overthrow him, but he just laughed and threw a lavish winter festival in their honor. That night, mad Ludwig took his guests on a tour of his castle, in a fleet of golden sleighs. No one knows what really happened, but they say the walls echoed with terror... The next morning, the sleighs were found in their stalls, but no one ever found Ludwig or his party guests, and to this day, the castle remains frozen in time.

As the final words were spoken, the torches in the chamber turned to blue flames as a stone wall lifted, ushering guests into a grand hall in which the fleet of golden sleighs again waited, ready for Ludwig's newest guests.

=== Ride ===
Immediately upon the ride's beginning, the sleigh rounded a corner, entering into the forest outside the castle. There, gnarled trees with glowing, vague faces seemed to groan "Why are you here?" "Get out" in a deep voice. Approaching the castle's front doors, the ghostly apparition of Ludwig's mother flew out of the door, hovering just in front of the vehicle, warning riders that they must get outside the castle walls, because her son had no power there. Just as she disappeared, Ludwig's voice boomed through the courtyard, menacingly inviting riders to tour his castle as two stone wolves adorning the stairway came to life and leaped onto the sleigh, snarling and biting at riders.

Once inside, suits of armor adorning a long hallway came to life, stepping off their pedestals and jabbing spears towards riders. One of the helmets fell off, ricocheting off the floor and levitating just in front of the sleigh, its face-guard lifting to reveal a skeletal face screeching within. Retreating down another hallway, guests entered the music room where the ghost of Ludwig manifested in a flaming whirlwind, blowing gusts of air onto riders and lifting the various musical instruments into the air, slamming them around the room. Outraged at the intrusion, he shouted "You have such hunger for my secrets? Come, it shall be fed!", launching a flaming blue orb at riders, which pushed the ride vehicle in to the next scene.

Blasted backwards into the kitchen, the sleigh looked down a long dining table set for a feast. Ludwig's ghostly voice emanated from the walls as knives flew at the riders, whizzing past on all sides. Appearing at the opposite head of the table, Ludwig grabbed a knife, flew towards the sleigh, and mocked cutting off his own head, as it appeared on a platter being served by a skeletal waiter.

Entering into a dimly lit hallways, Ludwig's mother's voice again urged riders that they "must get out before it's too late." Ludwig mockingly told his mother that the guests ought to stay, as it was about to be "a blast." Just then, the torches all blew out as a wall of wind gusted down the hall. Passing a brightly lit portrait of the young Ludwig and disfigured paintings of his parents, the sleigh pulled into the two-story library. There, above the fireplace, a portrait of Ludwig came to life, issuing guests towards the smoking, flaming fireplace. As the sleigh was physically felt pulling away from the fire, Ludwig pulled it in. The vehicle spun out-of-control in the pitch-black darkness, rising out of the chimney.

Immediately out of the chimney, Ludwig's mother grabbed hold of the sleigh and pulled it through the sky, weaving between the castle's turrets as they crash down, leading riders to the castle's walls and escape from Ludwig's powers. But Ludwig grabbed the sleigh, pushing it back towards the castle. His mouth opened as his tongue turned into a snake, hissing and lashing out at riders.

The sleigh spun around and its nose dipped down towards the courtyard below, but Ludwig's mother grabbed halt of it before the sleigh could fall. A comet shot down past the guests into the ground below, and Ludwig's fiery apparition launched toward the sleigh, morphing into a werewolf as he roared "Mother, you're driving me insane!" From behind the vehicle his mother shouted "Ludwig, my son, you were never sane to begin with!"

Just then, Ludwig fell from the sky and dabbed, dragging the sleigh with him in a simulated free-fall from the castle's turret and crashing into the glass conservatory, complete with frozen plants and golden wolf statues. Ludwig leaped over the sleigh, his weight cracking the ground as the sleigh dropped again, this time down into a cavern underneath the castle. The cave walls depicted ghostly faces with glowing eyes and mouths. Rounding the corner, Ludwig's werewolf figure burst down a door, leaping towards the car with his claws outstretched. His mother laughed, shouting "They are beyond your reach!" Leaving the castle walls and thus forfeiting his eternal soul, Ludwig turned to ice and shattered, spraying riders with water. His voice echoed through the hall, "You will never escape!" as the sleigh returned to the great hall and guests disembarked.

== Design ==
Curse of DarKastle's ride and set elements were designed by Falcon's Treehouse of Orlando, Florida. The 3D digital effects were designed and produced by Super 78 Studios of Los Angeles, California. The lighting was finished by Thompson Consulting Engineers of Hampton, Virginia.

== Technology ==
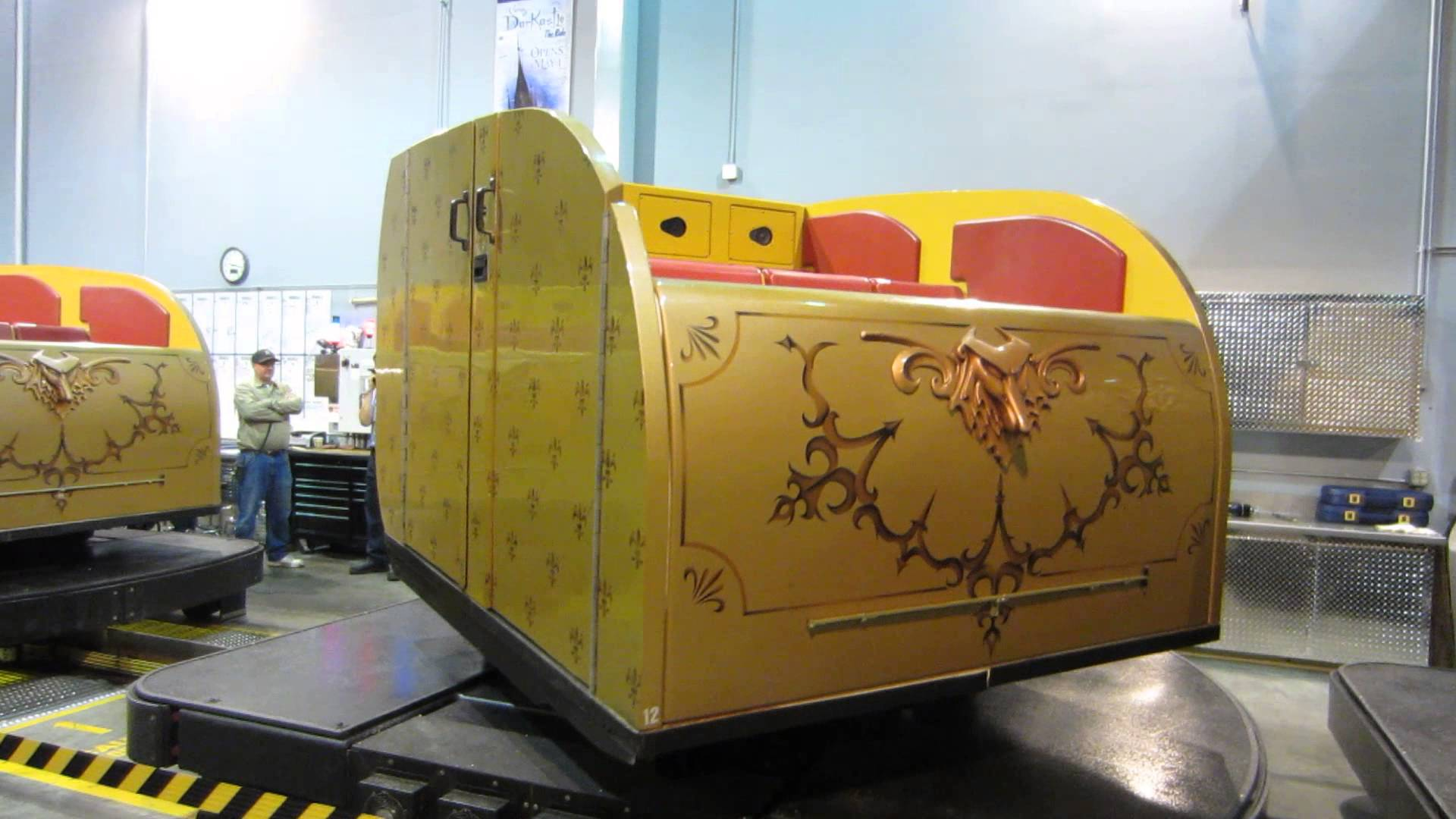
Curse of DarKastle "EVOLUTION" ride vehicle

Curse of DarKastle featured a ride system (vehicles, track, and ride control system) developed by the Entertainment Systems division of Oceaneering International, Inc called EVOLUTION Dark Ride System. The vehicles were capable of pitch, roll, heave, and yaw motions as they moved through the attraction, programmed to synchronize with the attraction show. The motion base had a four degree motor.

Similar technology developed by Universal Creative is utilized in The Amazing Adventures of Spider-Man, which predates DarKastle, opening in 1999 at Universal's Islands of Adventure theme park in Orlando, Florida and in 2004 at Universal Studios Japan. Spider-man's ride system utilizes electric screw drives for yaw, pitch and roll whereas DarKastle uses pneumatic airbags. Since its opening another attraction of this type has been commissioned in Japan at the Tokyo Dome (Tokyo Panic Cruise, 2009) and at Ferrari World theme park on Yas Island in Abu Dhabi.

== Inspiration ==
Curse of DarKastle gets its inspiration from King Ludwig II of Bavaria, who spent much of his family’s fortune on mysterious castles and art. His most noted structure is Neuschwanstein Castle, which DarKastle is loosely based on. He reigned from 1864 to his mysterious death in 1886. When Ludwig reached a debt of 14 million marks, he was deemed insane and was taken into custody. He was found in a lake at Berg Castle soon after, and it was ruled a suicide by drowning, though there was no water in his lungs and he was a strong swimmer.

== 2006 Update ==
In the off-season after the ride's first year in operation, the park took advantage of a system set up to allow scenes to be added and changed wirelessly and efficiently. Four scenes were changed, in the hopes of better taking advantage of the 3D technology and creating a more thrilling ride. An on-ride video of the original ride before the update can still be seen online (see, external links).

- Before the update, a large group of guests would enter the circular stone chamber and the preshow video would play. When the video finished, the Narrator's voice could be heard saying, "Now enter... if you dare" and the passageway in the wall would open allowing the group of guests to continue along the line. Then another group would enter the stone chamber and the preshow would restart. After the update however, the line continued on through the stone chamber, the passageway in the wall is always open and you would only be able to view the preshow if you were currently in the chamber when it played. The original preshow system returned in the 2012 season.
- Originally, in the opening scene, Ludwig's yellow eyes appeared on the doorway after his mothers initial warning to turn back. Only then did the stone wolves flanking the door come to life - just as the car spun around to enter the castle, the wolf leapt towards it. After the update, Ludwig's eyes are not present (though his voiceover remains), and a wolf jumps onto the car, snarling and biting at the riders for a moment before the sleigh turns.
- In the dining room scene, Ludwig remained seated at the opposite head of the table as the covered platter flies towards the riders. Lifting the platter's dome, Ludwig's head was revealed to be underneath it. After the update, Ludwig actually approaches the vehicle, grabbing a cleaver off the table and cuts off his own head (though he disappears as he does so, so no gore is shown) before the waiter approaches with his head.
- After the music room and before entering the library, the sleigh slowly traveled down the hallway, viewing portraits of Maximilian II (Ludwig's father), Ludwig, and Marie (Ludwig's mother) as Maximilian and Marie's portrait lights dimmed and Ludwig's became brighter. After the update, the sleigh now travels down this hallway backwards, looking at the torches that were previously behind riders in order to accommodate the air blast effect. The sleigh still does come within view of the original three portraits, now promptly before entering the library. Ludwig's portrait remains lit, and his parents' are dim and disfigured.
- The final change was the most noticeable. Originally, after the fireplace scene, the sleigh would exit from the darkness into a "ballroom" scene, where various ghosts were seen dancing together to classical music. A "waiter" ghost then offered 3D champagne to the riders. The dance was interrupted by a raving Ludwig, who was held back by two of his ghostly victims, shouting "Mother they're mine!" Throwing his restrainers to each side, he then flew off to the right, which transitioned into the "sideways" scene, where Ludwig transforms into the werewolf. After the 2006 update, the fireplace scene led into the "escape" scene, where Ludwig's mother grabs the sleigh and pulls it through the air, flying at high speed as towers crash on either side (see above). Then, Ludwig grabs the sleigh as a snake comes out of his mouth and bites at riders.
- Due to these changes, the story of Ludwig's battle with his mother was somewhat downplayed, with dialogue between the two limited. This includes an exchange in the portrait hallway and during the ballroom sequence.
