= Trailblazer =

Trailblazer or trail blazer may refer to:

== Awards ==
- AMVCA Trailblazer Award, one of the Africa Magic Viewers Choice Awards
- NAACP Theatre Award – Trailblazer Award, an award presented to an individual who has made their mark in the entertainment industry
- VH1 Trailblazer Honors, a televised LGBT awards ceremony in the United States

== Arts and entertainment ==
=== Fictional characters ===
- Trailblazer (Honkai: Star Rail), the main protagonist of the 2023 video game

=== Music ===
- Trailblazer (album), a 1990 live album by punk band All
- "Trailblazer" (song), a 2025 single by Reba McEntire, Miranda Lambert, and Lainey Wilson
- Trail Blazer, an album by the Turkish heavy metal band Mezarkabul
- "Trailblazer", a 2017 single by Nora En Pure

=== Film and television ===
- The Trail Blazers a 1940 Monogram Pictures film that began a film series
- Daniel Boone, Trail Blazer, a 1956 American film
- Trail Blazers (film), a 1953 American film directed by Wesley Barry
- Trailblazers (TV series), a 2007 British television program broadcast on XLEAGUE.TV

== Sports ==
- Derby Trailblazers, a British semi-professional basketball team
- North Carolina Trailblazers, a US women's recreational ice hockey association
- Portland Trail Blazers, a basketball team based in Portland, Oregon
- Southampton Trailblazers, a British basketball club

== Technology and computing ==
- TrailBlazer, a 1980s–1990s high speed modem by Telebit
- Trailblazer (satellite), a technology demonstration satellite, which was to have been operated by the US Air Force and Missile Defense Agency
- Trailblazer (video game), a 1986 video game by Gremlin Graphics, later updated for the Gizmondo
  - Cosmic Causeway: Trailblazer II, its sequel
- Trailblazer Project, a NSA programme to track communication methods such as cell phones and email
- Trailblazer-class cruiser starship in Lightspeed (video game)
- Trailblazers (video game), a 2018 video game by British studio Supergonk

== Transportation and travel ==
- Chevrolet Trailblazer (crossover), subcompact crossover SUV produced by General Motors since 2020
- Chevrolet TrailBlazer (SUV), a sport utility vehicle made by General Motors an offered in North America during 2001–2008
  - Saab 9-7X, rebadged Chevrolet nicknamed 'Trollblazer'
- Lunar Trailblazer, an American lunar orbiter planned by NASA
- Trail Blazer (train), a Pennsylvania Railroad train, which ran from Chicago to New York via Pittsburgh
- Trailblazer, a highway shield and route marker roadside sign assembly
- Trailblazer (monorail), a suspended monorail that operated at Fair Park in Dallas, Texas, from 1956 to 1964
- Trailblazer (rocket), an American rocket used between 1961 and 1967
- Trailblazer (travel), an independent British publisher of travel, trekking, and railway route guides
- Trailblazer Travel Books, a US series of guidebooks focusing on Hawaii

== Other uses ==
- Trailblazer (board game), a 1981 science fiction game
- Trailblazer (roller coaster), a rollercoaster at Hersheypark, USA
- Trailblazer Pipeline, a natural gas pipeline that brings natural gas from Colorado into Nebraska
- The Old Trailblazer, nickname of Albert Pendarvis, an American Christian broadcaster
- Operation Trailblazer, a coalition military operation in the Iraq War
- Trailblazer, playable main protagonist in Honkai: Star Rail

== See also ==
- Blazer (disambiguation)
- RailBlazer, a steel roller coaster at California's Great America
