= Lotus III: The Ultimate Challenge =

1992 video game

- Developer(s): Magnetic Fields
- Publisher(s): Gremlin Graphics
- Composer(s): Patrick Phelan
- Platform(s): Amiga, Amiga CD32 (part of Lotus Trilogy), Atari ST, MS-DOS, Sega Genesis
- Release: 1992
- Genre(s): Racing
- Mode(s): Single-player, multiplayer

Lotus III: The Ultimate Challenge is the third and final game in the Lotus racing series.

== Gameplay ==
MS-DOS screenshot

The third game in the series combined the gameplay aspects of its predecessors, allowing players to choose between racing opponents of Lotus Turbo Challenge or the arcade-like time trials of Lotus 2. The two-player option was retained and the music selection feature returns (Patrick Phelan's soundtrack to Lotus III spawned many modern remixes). Lotus III also added a third car - a concept Lotus M200 automobile - and allowed the player to choose which one to race with. The game recycled most of the graphics from Lotus 2, but added a number of new sceneries.

The Genesis/Mega Drive version bears the name Lotus II: RECS (referring to the game's new course creation feature) or simply Lotus II depending on country of release, while the MS-DOS port released in 1993 was called Lotus: The Ultimate Challenge. The MS-DOS version features the Lotus Esprit S4 instead of the Esprit Turbo SE. Apart from the slightly different cars graphics, the difference in gameplay is minimal, if any. The MS-DOS version was released again in 1996, this time on a CD-ROM.

Lotus III features a Racing Environment Construction Set (RECS) course creation system. The system allows users to create a race track by defining various basic parameters, such as number and difficulty of turns and hills, number of obstacles, type of scenery or difficulty of opponents. The created track can then be raced by one or both players. The course can also be written in form of a letter-and-digit code and later reused; these can be raced individually or in a series of up to nine user-created tracks.

The RECS system allows players to quickly create a unique track without having to use a course editor, but it sacrificed the facility of precisely positioning turns or obstacles. The RECS system was later reused in another Magnetic Fields' game, International Rally Championship.

The Amiga and Genesis versions of Lotus III again contain a hidden game, accessed by the password CU AMIGA in the Amiga version and POD PLEASE on the Genesis. The game is a graphically enhanced remake of Southern and Morris' Commodore 64 game POD.

== Reception ==
Electronic Gaming Monthly gave the Genesis version a 5.4 out of 10. They complimented the course creation system but said the game is otherwise "more of the same" of the first Lotus game. Computer Gaming World in August 1994 rated it 3.5 stars out of five and the best of four reviewed racing games. While recommending World Circuit for those wanting a racing simulation, the magazine approved of the "surprisingly realistic and consistent" car control, variety of courses, and the track designer.

Page 6 was more negative to the game, saying "Perhaps Gremlin should ask Sean Connery to appear in the next edition and see if he can stop this sequelisation going entirely downhill. Sorry Gremlin I did not like this."

PC Zone said: "Although Lotus is not as good as it might have been [...] it's still very playable and in two player mode pretty good fun".

Matthew Squires for Amiga Power said: "If you can't go like a bat out of hell on your Amiga, where can you do it? It's no disgrace, but the time of Lotus has passed".

David Reeves for OZAmiga Magazine wrote: "As car simulators go, the Lotus series has been very well received and this latest edition should be no exception".

== Reviews ==
- MicroMania (Spanish)
- PC Mania (Spanish)
- Computer Privat (Danish)
- Aktueller Software Markt (German)
- PC Games (German)
- Power Play (German)
- Świat Atari (Polish)
- Amiga Games (German)
- HiScore Professionel (Danish)
- The Games Machine Action Amiga (Italian)
- Superjuegos (Spanish)
- Computer Det Nye (Danish)
