= Championship Rally =

Championship Rally may refer to:

== Video gaming ==
- Championship Rally (1991 video game), a video game made for the Nintendo Entertainment System
- Championship Rally, a 1993 video game made for the PC Engine, see List of TurboGrafx-16 games
- Championship Rally (2000 video game), a video game made for the Atari Lynx
- Rally Championship (series), a series of video games released from 1988 to 2002
- World Rally Championship (video game series), a series of five video games for the Sony PlayStation

== Motorsport ==
- World Rally Championship, the FIA rally series 1973–present

== See also ==
- Rally Championship (disambiguation)
