= RCX =

RCX may refer to:

- Remote code execution, when malware can run its own code on a compromised system
- RCX register, a 64-bit processor register of x86 CPUs
- Rally Championship Xtreme
- Retrocommissioning (RCx), see National Environmental Balancing Bureau § Fumehood Testing (FHT) and Retro-Commissioning (RCX) Programs
- A Lego Mindstorms controller device
- The circumflex branch of the left coronary artery
