= Rally Championship =

Rally Championship may refer to:

- Rally Championship (series), a video game series based on Rally GB
- Rally Championship (video game), a 2002 and the last video game in the series

== See also ==
- Rally Championships
- World Rally Championship
- Sega Rally Championship
- Championship Rally (disambiguation)
