= Super Cars =

1990 video game

- Title screen
- Developers: Magnetic Fields; Gremlin Graphics (NES)
- Publishers: Gremlin Graphics; Electro Brain (NES)
- Composers: NES version Barry Leitch
- Platforms: Amiga, Atari ST, Amstrad CPC, Commodore 64, NES, ZX Spectrum
- Release: 1990
- Genre: Sport
- Mode: Single-player

Super Cars is a top-view racing game from Gremlin Interactive, who later produced the Lotus series of games. Stylistically, the game is influenced by Super Sprint.

There are endless tracks on each of the four difficulty levels, which can be raced in any order (although the last track is made harder than usual). In the races, the player wins money which can be spent on temporary handling and power upgrades, plus armour plating and front/rear shooting missiles that can knock out other racers. The player must finish in the top three of each race to advance; initially there are four computer opponents, but more are added as the game progresses.

The car can be upgraded throughout the game via the shop section. The player is given a price, but also a number of options of things to say to the salesman and with the right combination, the price will drop.

The NES version was released exclusively in America in 1991 by Electro Brain.

It was followed by Super Cars II in 1991.

== Cars ==
Three cars are available for purchase during the game, the Taraco Neoroder Turbo, the Vaug Interceptor Turbo and the Retron Parsec Turbo. Each appears to be based on a real car of the time with the Retron Parsec Turbo being based on the Cizeta-Moroder V16T, the Vaug Interceptor based on the Honda NSX and the Taraco Neoroder based on the Alfa Romeo SZ (Sprint Zagato), but with some slight changes. This is in slight contrast to the box art, where the blue "starter" car (Taraco) instead more closely resembles a contemporary European Ford Fiesta or Escort Cosworth convertible. The Retron is also portrayed differently on the box art, where it is a Lamborghini Countach instead of a Cizeta.

Screenshot
