= Magnetic Fields (video game developer) =

British video game developer

Magnetic Fields (Software Design) Ltd.
- Company type: Video game developer
- Industry: Video games
- Founded: 1982
- Headquarters: Chester, Cheshire, United Kingdom
- Key people: Shaun Southern (Programming director); Andrew Morris
- Products: Lotus Esprit Turbo Challenge; Super Cars; Trailblazer; Rally Championship
- Website: magneticfields.co.uk at the Wayback Machine (archived 11 December 2007)

Magnetic Fields was a British game development company founded in February 1982 and best known for developers Shaun Southern and Andrew Morris. The company was originally named "Mr Chip Software" but renamed "Magnetic Fields (Software Design) Ltd." usually simply referred to as "Magnetic Fields", in 1988.

== History ==
Between 1982 and 1984, Magnetic Fields released their games themselves with limited success. In 1984 they ceased publishing games themselves and instead developed for Publishers Mastertronic and then later for Alternative Software, Gremlin Graphics and other publishers. Probably the best known game released under the Mr. Chip Software company name was Trailblazer which led to several sequels and ports to other systems. Most of the other games released under the Mr. Chip Software label were already focused on racing like Kikstart 2, but also some non-racing games such as Proof Of Destruction also found a fanbase. Although early development was focused on the Commodore 64 and VIC-20, the company widened the number of target platforms for their games in the mid 1980s. One of the other platforms included the Commodore 16, which featured a few conversions written by Southern, like a port of Trailblazer and a rewrite of Kikstart, but also a number of unique titles, including Arthur Noid and Bandits at Zero.

With the switch to the "Magnetic Fields" name the company also switched from 8-bit systems to the rather new 16-Bit systems, with their last 8-bit release being Super Scramble Simulator (a sort of silent third game in the Kikstart series). After developing games in a variety of different genres, Magnetic Fields soon focused on racing games. The 1985 release of Formula 1 Simulator was already technically on par with the competing racing games of that time.

In 1990, the company became well known for their releases Super Cars and Lotus Esprit Turbo Challenge, ported to the most popular home computer systems of the time. Especially the strong sales on the Amiga 500 and Atari ST platforms led to sequels in 1991. All three Lotus titles had the nice additional touch of including hidden games in them, with the sequel containing Shaun Sauthern's classic Duck Shoot game from the Vic 20. Lotus III: The Ultimate Challenge got TV recognition when it was featured on the TV series GamesMaster (S2/E11) where it was played by Formula One driver, Johnny Herbert.

Motif from Siegfried's Funeral March

The Magnetic Fields logo in the Amiga and PC versions of their games from Lotus Esprit Turbo Challenge to International Rally Championship is accompanied by a sound sample from Siegfried's Funeral March from Act 3 of Wagner's Götterdämmerung. They change this for their very last game, Rally Championship 2000.

In 1996 the company released Network Q RAC Rally Championship for the MS-DOS platform which received many favourable reviews and led to several expansions and sequels, including the X-Miles and International Rally Championship. The last release of the company was Mobil 1 Rally Championship for Windows and PlayStation platforms in 1999.

In 2000 Shaun Southern and Andrew Morris founded a new company called "Eugenicy" to develop more racing games but the company was closed down before anything was ever released. Andrew Morris released the original promotional trailer for Eugenicy on his YouTube channel in 2009.

The company has agreed to let fans distribute their 8-bit system software as long as no profit is made from these. This has led to additional interest in the company among users of emulators for such older hardware.

Kikstart I and II were released in 2010 for the Commodore 64 emulator on the iPhone.

On 5 May 2018 a retrospective video documentary/review produced by Everything Amiga was published on the subject of Kid Chaos. It tells the story of the games' troubled development history, and assesses its impact on the Amiga scene at the time, and long after.

Former Magnetic Fields artist, Andrew Morris, agreed for a scan of his original protagonist concept artwork to be included. This was the first time it had been revealed to the public. 'Cosmic Kitten' (alternatively 'Claws') as he was then known was to be the Amiga's answers to Sonic the Hedgehog. However, before publication the character was re-designed as a caveboy known simply as 'Kid' to avoid any legal conflict with SEGA who have always been very protective of their intellectual property.

== Games developed ==
- Pacmania (1983)
- AD Infinitum (1984)
- Duck Shoot (1984)
- Kwazy Kwaks (1984)
- Olympic Skier (1984)
- Caves of Doom (1985)
- Hero of the Golden Talisman (1985)
- Kikstart: Off-Road Simulator (1985)
- Tutti Frutti (1985)
- Trailblazer (1986)
- Cosmic Causeway: Trailblazer II (1987)
- Lotus Esprit Turbo Challenge (1990)
- Super Cars (1990)
- Super Cars II (1991)
- Lotus Turbo Challenge 2 (1991)
- Lotus III: The Ultimate Challenge (1992)
- Kid Chaos (1994)
- Supercars International (1996)
- Network Q RAC Rally Championship (1996)
  - Rally Championship: The X-Miles (1997)
- International Rally Championship (1997)
- Mobil 1 Rally Championship (1999)

== Games published ==
All of these games were published under the older company name Mr Chip Software.

- Pacmania (1983)
- AD Infinitum (1984)
- Kwazy Kwaks (1984)
- Olympic Skier (1984)
