= Network Q RAC Rally (video game) =

1993 video game

- DOS front cover featuring a Ford Escort Cosworth
- Developer: Pixelkraft
- Publishers: Europress: NA: Accolade (distributor); JP: Victor Entertainment (distributor)
- Series: Rally Championship
- Platforms: MS-DOS, PC-98, FM Towns
- Release: EU: 1993 (DOS); NA: 1994 (DOS); JP: 1994 (PC-98); JP: 1995 (FM Towns)
- Genre: Racing
- Modes: Single-player, multiplayer

Network Q RAC Rally (Rally in the US) is a rally computer game released for MS-DOS in November 1993. It was developed by British studio Pixelkraft and published by Europress Software, five years after Europress's Lombard RAC Rally. The new name reflects the change of sponsorship of the real-life annual RAC Rally event in Britain, on which the games are based on. Because of this, the game was also referred to as RAC Rally 2 by some critics.

Network Q RAC Rally was one of the earliest rally simulators, aiming for realism (including damage and weather conditions) in a three-dimensional environment. A version for Amiga was also touted for release but cancelled by Europress. Also, a version for the Super Nintendo was under development by Arc and for publishing by JVC but this version was not released either, but a prototype build exists. Europress released a sequel in 1996, called Network Q RAC Rally Championship (which would go on to create the Rally Championship series).

== Game principles ==
The game simulates the eponymous 1993 RAC Rally of Great Britain with all 35 stages except for the special stages. Car behaviour changes depending on the road surface and vehicle condition. Driving aids such as automatic braking and automatic transmission are available. Vehicles are serviced between stages. Four different tyre types are available.

The graphics consist of overlapping raster images that zoom as they are approached. An electronic co-driver provides English voice guidance. The game is controlled via keyboard or joystick.

Playable vehicles are:

- Ford Escort RS Cosworth
- Lancia Delta S4
- Mitsubishi Lancer Evolution
- Subaru Impreza 555
- Toyota Celica GT4

== Reception ==
Computer Gaming World in March 1994 reported that Rally's graphics were "strong" and that "the night time driving is about the best in any racing simulation". The magazine approved of the navigator voice's use of racing jargon. Elsewhere in the issue, the magazine said that the game "might be a fun experience for serious rally sports, but those racing fans who've grown accustomed to more detailed driving sims will probably race on by". In April 1994 the magazine stated that "Rally just doesn't cut the mustard in the realism department". Citing lack of collision detection, "both sloppy and oversensitive" controls, repeated crashes, lack of drafting, replays, or camera angles, and the competing IndyCar Racing and World Circuit, the magazine concluded that "die-hard racers will want to look elsewhere before considering Rally".
