= Crumble's Crisis =

1986 video game

- Developer: Ivan Mackintosh
- Publisher: Red Rat Software
- Composer: Richard Munns
- Platform: Atari 8-bit
- Release: 1986
- Genre: Action-adventure

Crumble's Crisis is an action-adventure video game written by Ivan Mackintosh and published by Red Rat Software in 1986 for Atari 8-bit computers. This is the first game in a trilogy of Captain Crumble's adventures, followed by Space Lobsters and Time Runner.

== Plot ==
Dozens of alien Fuzzie's have escaped from the inter-galactic zoo. Captain Crumble has to search all the five levels of the multiverse to find and snare the Fuzzies in the containment cages.

== Gameplay ==
Captain Crumble put his first Fuzzy in a cage.

Crumble's Crisis is a flip-screen action-adventure game in which the player controlling Captain Crumble equipped with a jet backpack flies through maze-like levels, dodges hostile fauna and searches for escaped zoo creatures. There are 5 unique zones to search, each containing 6 hiding Fuzzies. The player has only one life and if they touch any wall or enemy, it will deplete the suit's energy, but it can be recovered by collecting energy packs. As in Space Lobsters - the action takes place in a shrunken window - about 1/2 of the game screen, while the rest of it is filled with decorations and cages showing the number of captured Fuzzies.

== Reception ==
Crumble's Crisis received very positive reviews. In the review for Page 6 magazine, Jim Short found the game's graphics, sound, animation and gameplay "truly astounding". He also praised "a stunning comic title screen and accompanying music." Similarly, Niels Reynolds, who reviewed the game for Atari User magazine, rated it at 8 points overall, including a 9 out of 10 points for playability.
