= Database Software =

Database Software may refer to:

- Database software, an alternative capitalisation used to refer to software used to manage a database
- Europress, A company previously trading under the name Database Software
