= Network Q RAC Rally Championship =

1996 video game by Magnetic Fields

- European cover art featuring Subaru Impreza WRC
- Developer: Magnetic Fields
- Publisher: Europress
- Series: Rally Championship
- Platform: MS-DOS
- Release: 1996
- Genre: Racing
- Modes: Single-player, multiplayer

Network Q RAC Rally Championship (Note: Rally Championship: International Off-Road Racing in North America, Rallye Racing '97 in Germany) is a rally computer game released for MS-DOS in October 1996. It was developed by British studio Magnetic Fields and published by Europress as a sequel to Network Q RAC Rally (1993), the third and final officially licensed game based on the real-life RAC Rally event in Britain.

An expansion pack, The X-Miles, was released around spring 1997. It added 10 new tracks with jumps and tunnels, and an arcade mode. The game received a sequel also released in 1997, called International Rally Championship. Altogether these are grouped as the Rally Championship series.

== Game principles ==
Network Q RAC Rally Championship features 28 stages, based on the 1995 RAC Rally of Great Britain, with various weather conditions. It has a refreshed line of vehicles for the player: Subaru Impreza, Ford Escort RS Cosworth, Renault Mégane, Škoda Felicia, Volkswagen Golf 3 and Proton Wira.

== Reception ==
Reception

Review scores
Publication	Score
GamesMaster	60/100
GameSpot	8.1/10
PC Games (DE)	81%
PC Zone	94%

GameSpot was positive to the game, commending its graphics, visual car damage, and enhanced multiplayer support. PC Zone praised the game and ultimately gave it a "Classic Award".
