= Mobil 1 Rally Championship =

1999 video game

- SEAT Ibiza
- Developers: Magnetic Fields; Creative Asylum Limited; Atod, HotGen (PS1)
- Publishers: Actualize (PC, PS1); Electronic Arts (PS1)
- Designer: Andrew Morris
- Programmer: Shaun Southern
- Composer: Darren Ithell
- Series: Rally Championship
- Platforms: Windows, PlayStation
- Release: EU: 19 November 1999 (PC); EU: 11 February 2000 (PS); NA: 2 March 2000
- Genre: Racing
- Modes: Single player, Multiplayer

Mobil 1 Rally Championship (Note: full title: Mobil 1 British Rally Championship) (also known as Rally Championship 2000) is a rally video game released in November 1999 for Windows and then PlayStation in 2000. The game is officially licensed for and simulates the real-life British Rally Championship event. The PC game was developed by Magnetic Fields and Creative Asylum and published by Actualize (formerly known as Europress Software) along with regional distribution partners. The console version was developed by Atod and HotGen Studios and published by Electronic Arts.

The game is part of the Rally Championship series and was a sequel to International Rally Championship (1997). The PC version is notable for stages based on real-life Ordnance Survey and Ordnance Survey of Northern Ireland maps in an attempt for further realism. One major change was free-roaming maps without invisible walls. It also expanded the number of available vehicles. A sequel, Rally Championship Xtreme, was released in 2001.

== Reception ==
Reception

Aggregate score
Aggregator	Score	
Aggregator	PC	PS
GameRankings	85%	63%

Review scores
Publication	Score	
Publication	PC	PS
AllGame	4/5	N/A
CNET Gamecenter	8/10	4/10
Edge	9/10	N/A
Electronic Gaming Monthly	N/A	4.5/10
EP Daily	10/10	6.5/10
Game Informer	N/A	5.75/10
GameFan	90%	N/A
GameRevolution	N/A	C−
GameSpot	8.9/10	5.8/10
IGN	8.8/10	3/10
Next Generation	3/5	N/A
Official U.S. PlayStation Magazine	N/A	3/5
PC Accelerator	7/10	N/A
PC Gamer (US)	90%	N/A

The PC version received favorable reviews, while the PlayStation version received mixed reviews, according to the review aggregation website GameRankings. Adam Pavlacka of NextGen said that the former version was "not quite the best rally game out there, but it is definitely a contender." Kraig Kujawa of Official U.S. PlayStation Magazine said that the PlayStation version "offers nothing out of the ordinary–everything is just good enough not to get low marks. The sluggish pace of the game and the non-familiarity with this particular race will ruin the game for most racing fans." Edge, however, said of the PC version, "Thoroughly absorbing and rarely anything less than thrilling, Championship is a revelation." Mark Kanarick of AllGame agreed, calling the same PC version "a fun, adrenaline-pumping game that is great to play alone or with others (via split-screen action or through a network). It is the best rally game to come along, and that is saying something." Nash Werner of GamePro called the PC version "a better racer than anyone could have predicted, recreating the wonderful world of Euro-rally racing on your home PC." (Note: GamePro gave the PC version two 4/5 scores for graphics and fun factor, 3/5 for sound, and 4.5/5 for control.)

The PC version was nominated for the "Best Driving Game" award at GameSpot's Best and Worst of 2000 Awards, and for the "Best Driving Game for PC" award at The Electric Playground's Blister Awards 2000, both of which went to Need for Speed: Porsche Unleashed.
