= NEBB =

NEBB may refer to:

- National Environmental Balancing Bureau
- Norsk Elektrisk & Brown Boveri (Norwegian manufacturing company; now defunct.)
