= Blazer (disambiguation) =

A blazer is an item of clothing.

Blazer or blazers may also refer to:

== People ==
- Blazer (surname)
- Blazer (given name):
  - Ashley Blazer Biden (born 1981), American social worker, activist, philanthropist, and fashion designer
- Owen Hart (1965–1999), Canadian professional wrestler nicknamed The Blue Blazer
- Takuya Sugi (born 1983), Japanese professional wrestler known as El Blazer

== Sports teams ==
- Barisal Blazers, a cricket team in Barisal Division, Bangladesh
- Bellingham Blazers, former name of the Surrey Eagles, an ice hockey team in the British Columbia Hockey League in Surrey, British Columbia, Canada
- Benilde Blazers, athletic teams of De La Salle-College of Saint Benilde in Malate, Manila, Philippines
- Boston Blazers (1992–1997), a former lacrosse team in the Major Indoor Lacrosse League in Boston, Massachusetts, US
- Boston Blazers (2009–11), a former professional lacrosse team in the National Lacrosse League in Boston, Massachusetts, US
- Boulevard Blazers, an association football team in Pembroke Parish, Bermuda
- Buffalo Blazers (1976–1978, 1980), a former professional soccer team in the National Soccer League in Buffalo, New York, US
- Florida Blazers, former name of the San Antonio Wings, a US World Football League team
- The Highlands School Blazers, athletics teams of the PK–12 school in Irving, Texas, US
- Hood College Blazers, athletics teams of Hood College, Frederick, Maryland, US
- Kamloops Blazers, a junior ice hockey team in the Canadian Western Hockey League
- Lloydminster Blazers, former name of the Lloydminster Bobcats, an ice hockey team in Lloydminster, Saskatchewan/Alberta, Canada
- New England Blazers (1989–1991), a former lacrosse team in the Major Indoor Lacrosse League in Worcester, Massachusetts, US
- Oklahoma City Blazers (1965–1977), a former professional ice hockey team in the Central Professional Hockey League in Oklahoma City, Oklahoma, US
- Oklahoma City Blazers (1992–2009), a former professional ice hockey team in the Central Hockey League in Oklahoma City, Oklahoma, US
- Osaka Blazers Sakai, a professional men's volleyball team in Sakai, Osaka, Japan
- Philadelphia Blazers (1972–1973), a former ice hockey team in the World Hockey Association in Philadelphia, Pennsylvania, US
- Portland Trail Blazers, a professional basketball team in the National Basketball Association in Portland, Oregon, US
- Quakertown Blazers, a baseball team in the US Atlantic Collegiate Baseball League
- Sackville Blazers, an ice hockey team in Nova Scotia, Canada
- Saint Benedict Blazers, the athletic teams of the College of Saint Benedict in St. Joseph, Minnesota, US
- Saskatoon Blazers, a Canadian Midget AAA ice hockey team
- Syracuse Blazers, a former minor league hockey team in Syracuse, New York, US
- UAB Blazers, the athletic teams of the University of Alabama at Birmingham, Alabama, US
  - UAB Blazers football
  - UAB Blazers men's basketball
- Valdosta State Blazers, the athletic teams of Valdosta State University in Georgia, US
  - Valdosta State Blazers football
- Vancouver Blazers, an ice hockey franchise in the US World Hockey Association
- West Virginia Blazers, a basketball team in the American Basketball Association

== Other uses ==
- Blazer, former incarnation of the Irish 1980s post-punk band Cruella de Ville
- Blazer 23, a Canadian sailboat design
- Blazer (EP), a 2008 EP by Kavinsky
- Blazer (video game), a 1987 Japanese arcade game by Namco
- Blazer (web browser), an internet web browser
- Blazer horse, a breed of horse
- Chevrolet Blazer (disambiguation), several kinds of sports utility vehicle (SUV)
- Blue Blazer cocktail
- HMS Blazer (P279), a British naval vessel
- Nike Blazers, a shoe
- The Blazers, an American band

== See also ==
- Blazar, a type of quasar
- Blazor, a web framework
- Trailblazer (disambiguation)
- Brazier (disambiguation)
