= Robot Knights =

1986 video game

- Developer: Richard Watton
- Publisher: Red Rat Software
- Platform: Atari 8-bit
- Release: 1986
- Genre: Platform
- Modes: Single-player, simultaneous two-player

Robot Knights is a 1986 platform game developed and programmed by Richard Watton and published by Red Rat Software for the Atari 8-bit computers. Players take control of one of two Robot Knights, wielding either a shield or a bow, as they navigate the Mad Scientist Otto's medieval-castle laboratories to defeat undead guardians and ultimately confront Otto himself.

== Gameplay ==
Player One (pink knight with shield) jumps to block and reflect a fireball back at a skeletal zombie, while Player Two (green knight with bow) awaits on a ledge in dungeon one

The game opens with a brief story prologue outlining Otto's escape to 13th-century Europe and his creation of monstrous zombies in an isolated castle. Gameplay is organized into single-screen dungeon rooms connected by doors: each room contains skeletal zombies that hurl fireballs and environmental hazards. The player chooses at startup between two knight characters:

- A shield-wielding knight who can block incoming fireballs and reflect them back to defeat enemies.
- An archer knight who fires arrows upward to eliminate threats from a distance.

Controls are via joystick: moving left or right to navigate platforms and pressing the fire button to block or shoot. Contact with a creature or its fireball depletes the knight's energy; if energy reaches zero, the knight perishes and the player loses a life. Rooms must be cleared either by defeating all zombies or collecting energy packs before the exit door opens. Upon completing a room, the player advances deeper into the castle's vaults.

A simultaneous two-player mode allows both knights to play on the same screen cooperatively or competitively, with each using their chosen weapon. This two-player option introduces dynamic interactions as players coordinate or contend while dodging fireballs and battling zombies.

== Reception ==
Atari User (April 1987) praised the introductory story text and highlighted the two-player mode as a welcome twist on standard platformers, calling it "a fun" alternative for friends to play together. The reviewer found the variety of weapons and enemy animations engaging but noted that solo play could feel repetitive after extended sessions. Aktueller Software Markt (April 1987) was critical of the game's presentation, describing the graphics as "anything but good" and the sound effects as "two boring noises" that fail to enhance the action. The reviewer found the level design uninspired, whose endless rooms and lack of a true ending led to diminishing motivation, concluding that while the price was reasonable, the overall experience fell short of expectations.
