= Laser Hawk =

1986 video game

- Developer: Andrew Bradfield
- Publisher: Red Rat Software
- Artist: Harvey A. Kong Tin
- Platform: Atari 8-bit
- Release: 1986
- Genre: Scrolling shooter

Laser Hawk is a horizontally scrolling shooter for Atari 8-bit computers published by UK-based Red Rat Software. It was created in Dunedin, New Zealand by programmer Andrew Bradfield and artist Harvey A. Kong Tin.

A sequel, HawkQuest, also from Bradfield and Kong Tin, was released in 1989. Andrew Bradfield died in 2001 at age 35.

== Development ==
Action in level 5

Work on Laser Hawk started in 1985 and took about a year to complete. Laser Hawk was originally called Hot Copter by Bradfield. Red Rat Software came up with the name Laser Hawk.

== Reception ==
A review of Laser Hawk in the January 1987 issue of Atari User concluded, "While the game concept is perhaps getting a little long in the tooth, Red Rat has tweaked it nicely, treating it in a thoughtful and refreshing way. What it may lack in originality it makes up for in finesse." The overall score was 8 out of 10.

== Legacy ==
Laser Hawk was later included in the 4 Star Compilation, Volume 1 published by Red Rat, along with Escape from Doomworld, Domain of the Undead, and Panic Express.

The same team created the sequel, HawkQuest, released in 1989. Harvey Kong Tin was responsible for the overall design. Development started in 1986 with the finished game using four floppy disk sides at 90K apiece.
