= Daniel McCrohan =

Daniel McCrohan is a British travel writer and guidebook author who has contributed to more than 30 Lonely Planet guidebooks to countries in Asia. He has also written a number of guides for Trailblazer, including the 2019 edition of the company's seminal guidebook, the Trans-Siberian Handbook.

== Early career ==
McCrohan trained as a journalist in the UK, and worked as a news reporter for the Surrey Advertiser before becoming the sports editor at the local newspaper group, the Enfield Gazette & Advertiser. He went on to work as a sports reporter for Teletext before moving to China in 2005 to pursue a career in travel writing.

== Career in China ==
McCrohan lived and worked in China for more than a decade. He has written online articles on China for the BBC, Lonely Planet, CNN, and others, and has been interviewed about travel in China by China Daily and various Chinese television stations. He was also a co-host for nine episodes of the Lonely Planet television series Best in China.

== Travel writing ==
McCrohan co-wrote multiple editions of Lonely Planet China. and has written or co-written Lonely Planet guides to Beijing, Shanghai, Chengdu and Tibet. He has also contributed to multiple editions of Lonely Planet India, and is the author of the first edition of Lonely Planet's Pocket Delhi & Agra. He has also worked on Lonely Planet guides to Bangladesh, Thailand, Mongolia, Singapore and the Trans-Siberian Railway.

McCrohan has written numerous British walking guides for Trailblazer, and was the subject of a travel podcast about hiking Hadrian's Wall, a spin-off from the work he did on Trailblazer's guide to the Hadrian's Wall Path. He has also contributed various guides on long-distance footpaths for Horizon Guides.

He has led travel-writing workshops at the Bookworm Literary Festival in Beijing and has been a guest speaker at the Adventure Travel Show in London. His work has also appeared in a number of specialist travel publications including Wanderlust Magazine.
