= Trailblazer (travel) =

Trailblazer Publications
- Founded: 1991; 35 years ago
- Founder: Bryn Thomas
- Country of origin: United Kingdom
- Distribution: Simon & Schuster (USA)
- Publication types: Books
- Nonfiction topics: travel
- Official website: www.trailblazer-guides.com

Trailblazer is an independent British publisher of travel, trekking and railway route-guides. Started by author Bryn Thomas in 1991, it was originally synonymous with the Trans-Siberian Handbook, which for years was the only guide to crossing Asia by rail and remains much respected. Another early success was Mark Elliott and Wil Klass's Asia Overland (1998).

The company now publishes guides to long-distance footpaths in the United Kingdom, and hiking and adventure tourism guides to destinations elsewhere.
