= International Rally Championship =

1997 video game

- European Windows cover art featuring a Mitsubishi Lancer Evolution IV
- Developers: Magnetic Fields (PC); Europress (PS1)
- Publishers: EU: Europress; NA: Interplay / THQ
- Producer: Doug Braisby
- Programmers: Shaun Southern; Danny Hartley
- Artists: Andrew Morris; Ian Lewis
- Composers: Darren Ithell; Dave Sullivan
- Series: Rally Championship
- Platforms: Windows, PlayStation
- Release: Windows: EU: September 22, 1997; NA: July 2, 2001; PlayStation: PAL: July 1998
- Genre: Racing
- Modes: Single-player, multiplayer

International Rally Championship (released as Tommi Mäkinen Rally on PlayStation) is a rally racing video game which is a part of the Rally Championship series. The Windows version was developed by Magnetic Fields and published by Europress, and released in September 1997. The PlayStation version was solely ported and published by Europress in 1998 with endorsement by Finnish rally champion Tommi Mäkinen. It would be succeeded in 1999 by Mobil 1 Rally Championship.

== Gameplay ==
Compared to its predecessor Network Q RAC Rally Championship, International Rally Championship now features stages from all around the world and in differing environments. The game offers 16 new tracks set in various locations around the world and new features, such as Track Editor and playable up to 8 players via LAN, but there is no longer a cockpit view.

The featured cars were are Ford Escort, Mitsubishi Lancer, Nissan Almera, Proton Wira, Renault Mégane, Škoda Felicia, Subaru Impreza, Toyota Corolla and Volkswagen Golf.

== Reception ==
Reception

Review scores
Publication	Score
GameStar	69%
PC Games (DE)	86%
PC PowerPlay	79%
PC Zone	84%
CD-Action	8/10
Power Unlimited	74/100 (PS1)

French magazine Génération 4 awarded four star "hit" rating to the game and commended improved graphics over previous title in the series and inclusion of level editor, but criticized availability of only 15 new tracks (in comparison to 30 in Rally Championship).
