= International Soccer Challenge =

1990 video game

- Developer: MicroStyle
- Publisher: Red Rat Software
- Platforms: Amiga, Atari ST, MS-DOS
- Release: 1990
- Genre: Sports
- Modes: Single-player, multiplayer

International Soccer Challenge is a soccer video game developed by MicroStyle and published in 1990 for Amiga, Atari ST, and MS-DOS.

== Gameplay ==
The game is similar to MicroProse Soccer, but uses a 3D perspective.
