= Space Lobsters =

1987 video game

- Developer: Ivan Mackintosh
- Publisher: Red Rat Software
- Artist: Richard Munns
- Composer: Richard Munns
- Platform: Atari 8-bit
- Release: 1987
- Genres: Maze, shooter
- Mode: Single-player

Space Lobsters is a 1987 flip‑screen maze-shooter video game developed and published by Red Rat Software for the Atari 8-bit computers. Players guide Captain Crumble through the gargantuan alien starship Colossus, shooting hostile crustaceans and robot guardians while searching more than 150 rooms for computer codes needed to activate the escape pod.

== Reception ==
Page 6 magazine, an independent UK Atari journal, reviewed the game in issue 27. The reviewer praised the variety of rooms and the sense of exploration, describing Space Lobsters as "fast, colourful and good value for money" though they felt the cramped play window kept it from greatness. Atari User magazine awarded the game 7/10 overall. Reviewer Victor Laszlo praised its split‑screen graphics mix and "good, animated blast'em, run away, turn around and shoot'em again style" highlighting more than 150 screens and teleport mechanics. Sound, graphics, and value for money each scored 7/10, with playability rated 8/10. German magazine Aktueller Software Markt called the game "an appealing maze shooter" for Atari owners starved of new titles. The writer commended its colorful background art and smooth animation, though criticized the tiny playfield and repetitive in‑game sound.
