= Kikstart: Off-Road Simulator =

1985 video game

- Developer: Mr. Chip Software
- Publisher: Mastertronic
- Designer: Shaun Southern
- Platforms: Atari 8-bit, Commodore 16 / Plus/4, Commodore 64
- Release: 1985
- Genre: Racing
- Modes: Single-player, multiplayer

Kikstart: Off-Road Simulator is a racing video game designed by Shaun Southern and published by Mastertronic in 1985 for the Commodore 64. Versions for Commodore 16, Plus/4, and Atari 8-bit computers followed in 1986. A sequel, Kikstart 2, was released in 1987.

== Gameplay ==
Gameplay screenshot (Atari 8-bit)

In the game, the player takes on the role of a stuntman controlling a stunt motorcycle. The screen is divided into two parts - the player can compete against the computer or another player. There are several different tracks available in the game, on each of them we can find a different set of obstacles, such as water tanks, buses, cars, trees, etc. The player has to choose the right form of control for each combination of hazards. Some of them need to be taken slowly, others quickly, and the player has to learn the right timing for his jumps and wheelies. Each section of a track must be completed within a given time limit, indicated by a clock at the top of the screen.

== Reception ==
Kikstart: Off-Road Simulator received mostly positive reviews. Reviewers praised the simultaneous two-player mode and the low price. Your Commodore reviewer concluded: "The introduction of software of this quality at such realistic price can only be applauded and should go someway to discouraging piracy, surely most people can afford a couple of quid for an original game. Well done Mastertronic." Zzap!64 reviewer found the game: "incredible value for only £1.99 and I would thoroughly recommend it."
