= Red Rat Software =

Video game developer and publisher

- Founded: 1985
- Founder: Charles Partington; Harry Nadler; Don Rigby
- Defunct: 1993
- Headquarters: Manchester, UK
- Products: Video games

Red Rat Software was a Manchester, UK-based video game developer and publisher founded by Charles Partington, Harry Nadler, and Don Rigby that operated between 1985 and 1993.

The company initially focused on developing games for the Atari 8-bit computers. Throughout its operation, Red Rat Software expanded its offerings to include games for other platforms such as the Amiga, Atari ST, and DOS systems.

Some of the notable games developed by Red Rat Software include Panic Express, Crumble's Crisis, Astro-Droid, and Planet Attack, all primarily for the Atari 8-bit. They also ventured into titles for other platforms with games like Screaming Wings for the Amiga and Atari ST and Push-Over, which was available on multiple platforms including the SNES and MS-DOS.

== Games ==
Advertising flyer

=== 1985 ===
- A Day at the Races (Atari 8-bit)
- Sprong: The Quest for the Golden Pogostick (Atari 8-bit)

=== 1986 ===
- Crumble's Crisis (Atari 8-bit)
- Escape from Doomworld (Atari 8-bit, C64)
- Freaky Factory (Atari 8-bit)
- Laser Hawk (Atari 8-bit)
- Panic Express (Atari 8-bit, C64)
- Robot Knights (Atari 8-bit)
- Rocket Repairman (Atari 8-bit)
- Screaming Wings (Amiga, Atari 8-bit, Atari ST)
- Space Gunner (Atari 8-bit)
- Technicolor Dream (Atari 8-bit)
- The Domain of the Undead (Atari 8-bit)
- The First XLEnt Word Processor (Atari 8-bit)
- War-Copter (Atari 8-bit)

=== 1987 ===
- Astro-Droid (Atari 8-bit)
- Little Devil (Atari 8-bit)
- Nightmares (Atari 8-bit)
- Planet Attack (Atari 8-bit)
- River Rally (Atari 8-bit)
- Space Lobsters (Atari 8-bit)

=== 1988 ===
- Lombard RAC Rally (Amiga, Atari ST, MS-DOS)
- Speed Run (Atari 8-bit)

=== 1989 ===
- Hawkquest (Atari 8-bit)
- Time Runner (Amiga, Atari ST)

=== 1990 ===
- International Soccer Challenge (Amiga, Atari ST, MS-DOS)

=== 1991 ===
- Wild Wheels (Amiga, Atari ST, MS-DOS)

=== 1992 ===
- Push-Over (Amiga, Atari ST, MS-DOS, SNES)

=== 1993 ===
- One Step Beyond (Amiga, Atari ST, MS-DOS)
