= Rally Championship (video game) =

2002 video game

- PlayStation 2 cover art
- Developer: Warthog
- Publishers: PAL: SCi Games; NA: Conspiracy Entertainment
- Series: Rally Championship
- Platforms: PlayStation 2, GameCube
- Release: PlayStation 2: PAL: May 31, 2002; GameCube: PAL: February 7, 2003; NA: July 30, 2003
- Genre: Racing
- Modes: Single-player, multiplayer

Rally Championship is a rally video game. It was released for PlayStation 2 in 2002 and GameCube in 2003. It is developed by Warthog Games and published by SCi. It is the last game in the Rally Championship series. The game is a sequel to the 2001 game Rally Championship Xtreme. It is the first game in the series not published by Europress and the first game not released on the PC.

There are six different locations (Wales, Scotland, Isle of Man, United States, the Arctic and Kenya), with four tracks for each location.

== Reception ==
Reception

Aggregate score
Aggregator	Score	
Aggregator	GameCube	PS2
Metacritic	63/100	N/A

Review scores
Publication	Score	
Publication	GameCube	PS2
4Players	N/A	77%
Eurogamer	5/10	N/A
Famitsu	N/A	29/40
Gamekult	5/10	5/10
GameSpot	5/10	N/A
GameSpy	3/5	N/A
IGN	7/10	N/A
Jeuxvideo.com	11/20	11/20
Nintendo Power	2.6/5	N/A

The GameCube version received "mixed" reviews according to the review aggregation website Metacritic. Nintendo Power gave the European import a mixed review while the U.S. version was still in development. GameSpy called the GameCube version "solid", but said that it could not compete against stronger competition like Colin McRae, particularly in the graphics. In Japan, where the PlayStation 2 version was ported and published by Success on March 27, 2003, Famitsu gave it a score of 29 out of 40.
