= The First XLEnt Word Processor =

1986 word processor

- Original author: David Castell
- Developer: XLEnt Software
- Release: 1986; 40 years ago
- Platform: Atari 8-bit
- Type: Word processor
- License: Proprietary software

The First XLEnt Word Processor is a floppy disk-based word processor for Atari 8-bit computers published by XLEnt (pronounced "excellent") Software in 1986 and later by Red Rat Software. It was written by David Castell who was a student at the time. Though sold by a budget publisher for US$29.95, it was favorably compared with more established competitors.

== Overview ==
The First XLEnt Word Processor was released without copy protection in 1986 for $29.95 (equivalent to $88 in 2025). It runs on Atari 8-bit computers with 48 kB of RAM. Contemporary word processors for the Atari platform include PaperClip, AtariWriter Plus, and Letter Perfect.

The word processor includes cut-and-paste block moves of up to one screen, search-and-replace, chaining files, support for a variety of printers including graphics, mail merge, the insertion of graphics into a text document, inserting a text file into another text file, controlling the cursor with a joystick, editing two documents simultaneously, and raw text file export.

== Reception ==
Charles Cherry of Antic called it "as good or better than any other word processor you'll find for the 8-bit Atari". His list of advantages included performance and "very comprehensive printing capabilities". In a later comparison of seven word processors, Antic cited the issues with The First XLEnt Word Processor as, "the cut-and-paste buffer holds you to one screen—800 characters. Also, the printing section in the manual could be more informative." The word processor received an Outstanding Product award from Antic in 1987. When version 2.1 was released, Antic's Gregg Pearlman wrote, "First XLEnt Word Processor came highly recommended in its original version, and Version 2.1 merits an even longer look."
