= Andrew Bradfield =

New Zealand computer programmer

- Born: 1966
- Died: 21 September 2001
- Occupations: Video game programmer Stainless steel fabricator / welder
- Known for: Laser Hawk; Hawkquest

Andrew "Andy" Bradfield (1966 – 21 September 2001) was a video game programmer from New Zealand best known for his work on games for the Atari 8-bit computers. He created Laser Hawk (1986) and its sequel Hawkquest (1989). He teamed with artist Harvey Kong Tin on both titles.

He died on 21 September 2001, aged 35, following a two-year battle with leukemia.
