= Rally Championship Xtreme =

2001 video game

- Developer: Warthog Games
- Publisher: Actualize
- Series: Rally Championship
- Platform: Windows
- Release: EU: 2 November 2001
- Genre: Racing
- Modes: Single-player, multiplayer

Rally Championship Xtreme is a rally computer game released for Windows on 2 November 2001. It is part of the Rally Championship series, it succeeded Mobil 1 Rally Championship (1999) but is no longer licensed or based on its real-life rally competition. The game was developed by Warthog Games and published by Actualize (formerly known as Europress). It features 27 cars and 24 tracks from around the world. It was the penultimate game in the series and the successor Rally Championship was released in 2002 on consoles only.

== Reception ==
Reception

Review scores
Publication	Score
GameStar	75%
Jeuxvideo.com	14/20
PC Games (DE)	82%
Gamezilla	83/100
Gry Online	7.0/10
Imperium Gier	8.5/10
PC Gamer (Sweden)	72/100
PC Zone (Benelux)	81/100

Gamezilla gave a positive review but criticized the then-demanding technical performance.
