= Amiga Force =

British video game magazine

- Issue #10, September 1993
- Categories: Video game magazines
- Frequency: Monthly
- First issue: Autumn/Winter 1992
- Final issue Number: March 1994; 16
- Company: Europress/Impact Magazines
- Country: United Kingdom
- Language: English
- ISSN: 0967-702X

Amiga Force was a video games magazine launched towards the end of 1992 by Europress Impact. It lasted for 16 issues before being closed by its publishers. The first issue of Amiga Force went on sale around September 1992. The magazine would switch to monthly release soon after. Amiga Force showed many similarities to other Europress Impact titles, particularly Sega Force. Unlike rival magazine Amiga Power, Amiga Force decided not to include any coverdisks on the issues.

The magazine went through various designs and staff through its lifetime. The March 1994 issue was the last Amiga Force published when Impact Magazines went bust.
