= Push-Over (video game) =

1992 video game

- Developer: Red Rat Software
- Publisher: Ocean Software
- Platforms: Amiga, Atari ST, MS-DOS, Super NES
- Release: 1992
- Genre: Puzzle-platform
- Mode: Single-player

Push-Over is a puzzle-platform game developed by Red Rat Software and published by Ocean Software in 1992 for the Amiga, Atari ST, MS-DOS, and the Super Nintendo Entertainment System. The game was sponsored by Smiths' British snack Quavers (now owned by Walkers), and the plot revolves around the then Quavers mascot Colin Curly losing his Quavers packets down a giant ant hill. The player is tasked with controlling G.I. Ant, a large soldier ant, to recover the Quavers by solving a series of puzzles. The Super NES version lacks the Quavers branding, and instead the aim is to recover bundles of cash dropped down the ant hill by Captain Rat.

== Gameplay ==
The game consists of 100 levels of increasing complexity over nine different themed worlds. Each level features several interconnected platforms holding a number of "dominoes". The aim is to rearrange the dominoes, such that with a single push, all of the dominoes are toppled, thus opening the exit to the next level. There are 11 different types of domino, identified by red and yellow patterns, each with different actions. The player controls G.I. Ant, who can move certain dominoes by carrying them one at a time.

Various factors can result in failure to complete a level. As well as toppling all of the dominoes, the player must be able to access the exit door once the dominoes have fallen. For instance, the player will be unable to reach the exit if a ledge leading to the exit has been destroyed, or if a gap leading to the exit has not been bridged, or if a line of dominoes lie across the exit. G.I. Ant may die by falling from a large height, by falling off the bottom of the screen, or by being crushed under a falling domino. The player is then greeted with the message "You Failed, You Died" and has to restart the level. Also, the level will be failed if any dominoes are destroyed by landing one domino on top of another.

Each level has a time limit during which it must be completed. However, if the time runs out the player is still able to continue with the puzzle if they wish. By pausing the game once the time has run out, a small hint will be displayed, giving advice on how to complete the level. As a side note, the hint for level 98 informs the player that the game's designer cannot remember how to complete the level without trickery ("Use a drop! There is a way to make it work with a push, but I can't find it!").

The themed worlds, in order, are an industrial complex, an Aztec world, a space station, an electronic world, a Greek temple, a medieval castle, a Meccano-inspired world, a dungeon and a Japanese temple. Each world has 11 levels, making a total of 99 regular levels. A packet of Colin's Quavers is retrieved after each world, with nine packets in all to be collected. Many of the early levels are tutorials demonstrating how each type of domino will act. Often there is only a single solution to each level, though some levels have multiple solutions. The final level, level 100, must be completed using dominoes with hidden markings.

A password system allows the player to continue an earlier game, without having to restart from the first level. Additionally, upon completing a level the player gains a token, which once a level has been failed, allows the player to return to the point before the domino push, rather than having to return to the initial state of the level.

== Development ==
Creative differences between Red Rat Software and Ocean Software around branding and graphical changes overshadowed this title and a breakdown between both parties occurred once legal action was taken by Red Rat Software to regain creative control/claim a breach of contract. The legal battle led to the downfall of Red Rat Software, who were unable to fund continual legal costs vs the much deeper pockets of Ocean Software.

== Reception ==
Reception

Review scores
Publication	Score
Dragon	5/5 (Amiga)
Entertainment Weekly	B− (SNES)

The game was reviewed in 1993 in Dragon #193 by Hartley, Patricia, and Kirk Lesser in the "Role of Computers" column. The reviewers gave the game 5 out of 5 stars.

Entertainment Weekly gave the game a B− and wrote that "The theme of Pushover (Ocean of America, for Super NES) is ingenious — players have to line up 10 kinds of dominoes, then get them all to fall with a single push — but the static execution will have small kids dozing off way before their bedtime."

=== Reviews ===
- Amiga User International (Nov, 1992)
- ST Format (Oct, 1992)
- Amiga Action (Jul, 1992)
- ST Action (Mar, 1993)
- Amiga Format (Sep, 1992)
- The One Amiga (Jun, 1992)
- Power Play (Aug, 1992)
- Zero (Jul, 1992)
- Amiga Power (Jun, 1992)
- Amiga Joker (Sep, 1992)
- ST Format (Jan, 1994)
