= Lombard RAC Rally (video game) =

1988 video game

- Developer: Red Rat Software
- Publisher: Mandarin Software
- Series: Rally Championship
- Platforms: Atari ST, Amiga, MS-DOS
- Release: 1988
- Genre: Racing

Lombard RAC Rally is a 1988 rally video game developed by Red Rat Software and published by Mandarin Software (an imprint of Europress).

The game was based on the same rally (under the earlier sponsors' names) as the later Network Q RAC Rally games, and was the first of a series of related games published by Europress. It was released for the Atari ST, Amiga and MS-DOS formats.

The game prominently features an animated driver, seen from behind moving the steering wheel, with the road seen through the car's windscreen.

The game cover art features Jimmy McRae's Ford Sierra RS Cosworth from 1987.

Inspiration for the game came to Charles Partington and Harry Nadler (of RedRat Software) one lunch time when they were watching Lombard RAC Rally coverage on TV at the Top Cat Tavern (Manchester Corn Exchange/Hanging Ditch), which was located just around the corner from RedRat's offices. Charles and Harry had not previously seen rally coverage from an 'in-car' perspective and commented to each other that "we have to make a game out of this".

== Speed Run ==
Speed Run
- Developer: Red Rat Software
- Publisher: Red Rat Software
- Composer: Janette R. Armstrong
- Platform: Atari 8-bit
- Release: 1988
- Genre: Racing

Lombard RAC Rally's developers (Red Rat Software) also released a superficially similar game called Speed Run for Atari 8-bit computers with the same animated driver, but more simplistic through-the-window graphics and gameplay. Early adverts for Speed Run also mentioned an Atari ST version, but do not make clear whether that proposed version later evolved into Lombard RAC Rally instead.

Lombard RAC Rally (Amiga), left and Speed Run (Atari 8-bit), right
