= Screaming Wings =

1986 video game

- Developer: Don Rigby (as Paul Craven)
- Publisher: Red Rat Software
- Platforms: Atari 8-bit, Atari ST, Amiga
- Release: 1986
- Genre: Scrolling shooter

Screaming Wings is a vertically scrolling shooter video game developed and published by Red Rat Software for the Atari 8-bit, Atari ST, and Amiga. Often compared to Capcom’s classic arcade shooter 1942, Screaming Wings places the player in control of a lone Harrier-like jet fighter on missions behind enemy lines. The game included multilingual documentation (English, German, and French), as well as promotional items such as a Screaming Wings button and poster.

== Gameplay ==
Fighting a large bomber over an island (Atari 8-bit)

In Screaming Wings, the playfield scrolls vertically over repetitive landscapes of fields and seas. Players face waves of enemy aircraft that appear in set formations, culminating in larger “guardian” bombers acting as stage bosses. Defeating these enemies requires continuous maneuvering and shooting while avoiding hostile fire.

Throughout the levels, collectible power-ups, represented by letters, grant temporary or enhanced abilities. Among these are:

- Shields: Time-limited protection from enemy projectiles.
- Bombs: Triggered via the space bar, allowing the player to attack multiple foes at once.
- Increased Fire Rate: Sometimes referred to as “rapid fire” enabling faster shooting.
- Drone: A smaller craft that mirrors the player's movements and firing patterns in a symmetrical fashion.

Players must also contend with somewhat imprecise collision detection, which increases the overall difficulty level. The game's sound effects include a voice sample exclaiming “Game over man, game over!” upon defeat.

== Reception ==
Contemporary reviewers offered mixed to negative assessments of Screaming Wings. ST Action review described it as “well below the high standard players now expect” and deemed it a candidate for a “Golden Turkey award.” Aktueller Software Markt review acknowledged the game's decent speed and scrolling, yet pointed out that the unchanging scenery and limited sound design detracted from the overall experience.
