= Mini Office II =

- BBC Micro box cover
- Developer: Database Software
- Initial release: 1986; 40 years ago
- Type: Office suite
- License: Commercial proprietary software

Mini Office II, published by Database Software in 1986, was an office suite available for several home computers, including the Amstrad CPC, Atari 8-bit computers, BBC Micro, and Commodore 64. The software package could be purchased on cassette tape or floppy disk. Mini Office II was originally written for the BBC Micro Computer (in 6502 assembler) and was also available in EPROM format.

The office applications included in Mini Office II were listed as:

- Word processor
- Database
- Spreadsheet
- Graphics
- Communications
- Label Printer

An enhanced version, Mini Office Professional, was released for the Amstrad PCW in 1989.

The word processor on Mini Office II allows the user, after having loaded the word processor and created a word file and saved it, to load the word file directly from the tape without re-loading the word processor. If the user has a word file on tape it therefore loads in about three seconds.
