= Super Cars II =

1991 video game

- Developer: Magnetic Fields
- Publisher: Gremlin Graphics
- Composer: Barry Leitch
- Platforms: Amiga, Atari ST, MS-DOS
- Release: 1991
- Genre: Racing
- Modes: Single-player, multiplayer

Super Cars II is a 1991 top-down view racing video game developed by Magnetic Fields and published by Gremlin Graphics. The game was available for the Amiga and Atari ST, then released for MS-DOS as Super Cars International in 1996. It is the sequel to the 1990 game Super Cars.

An Alfa Romeo SZ appears in the title graphics.

== Reception ==
Reception

Review scores
Publication	Score
ACE	812/1000 (AMI)
Amiga Action	93%
Amiga User International	77%
Computer and Video Games	91% (AMI)
Games-X	5/5 (AMI)
Raze	85% (AMI)
Zero	88% (AMI)
Amiga Joker	87%
The One	91% (AMI)

Super Cars II received generally favorable reviews upon release. Carsten Borgmeier wrote in Amiga Joker magazine, "Super Cars II is the stuff computer runabouts dream of!"

Top Gear ranked Super Cars II No. 48 of the 50 greatest driving games for its career mode, which it said had not been surpassed since. Digital Spy listed the game as one of the 30 greatest Amiga games, citing its introduction of split-screen multiplayer and its combination of "plug-and-play simplicity with smooth handling and a palpable sense of speed". Den of Geek considered it to be one of the most underappreciated games for Atari ST.
