= Brazier (disambiguation) =

A brazier is a container to hold hot coals.

Brazier or Braziers may also refer to:

- a person who works brass
- Dairy Queen Brazier, a brand name of the hamburger sandwiches
- Brazier (name)
- Braziers, Ohio, a community in the United States
- Braziers Park, a manor house in Oxfordshire
- Brazier, Western Australia, locality in the Shire of Donnybrook–Balingup

== See also ==
- Brasier
- Brassiere
- Blazer (disambiguation)
