= Nora En Pure discography =

This is the discography of South African-Swiss DJ Nora En Pure.

== Compilation albums ==
Title	Details
Spring Tunes 2010	Released: 26 March 2010; Label: Goodnight Kiss Productions; Format: Digital download, CD

== Extended plays ==
Title	Details
Stockholm Tears	Released: 27 January 2010; Label: Goodnight Kiss Productions; Format: Digital download, CD
Velvet	Released: 7 May 2010; Label: Goodnight Kiss Productions; Format: Digital download, CD
Feel the Force	Released: 29 October 2010; Label: Goodnight Kiss Productions; Format: Digital download, CD
Deep House Session 1	Released: 29 April 2011; Label: Goodnight Kiss Productions; Format: Digital download, CD
Come With Me	Released: 23 April 2013; Label: Goodnight Kiss Productions; Format: Digital download, CD
Sweet Melody	Released: 13 August 2013; Label: Goodnight Kiss Productions; Format: Digital download, CD
True	Released: 4 August 2014; Label: Enormous Tunes; Format: Digital download, CD
Into the Wild	Released: 22 June 2015; Label: Enormous Tunes; Format: Digital download, CD
Morning Dew	Released: 11 January 2016; Label: Enormous Tunes; Format: Digital download, CD
Lake Arrowhead	Released: 9 May 2016; Label: Enormous Tunes; Format: Digital download, CD
Conquer Yosemite	Released: 10 February 2017; Label: Enormous Tunes; Format: Digital download, CD
Sphinx	Released: 23 February 2018; Label: Enormous Tunes; Format: Digital download, CD
Don't Look Back	Released: 13 July 2018; Label: Enormous Tunes; Format: Digital download, CD
Polynesia	Released: 16 November 2018; Label: Enormous Tunes; Format: Digital download, CD
Homebound	Released: 25 October 2019; Label: Enormous Tunes; Format: Digital download
Delta / Bartok	Released: 17 July 2020; Label: Enormous Tunes; Format: Digital download
Wholehearted	Released: 19 May 2023; Label: Enormous Tunes; Format: Digital download

== Singles ==
=== Charted singles ===
Title	Year	Peak chart positions
Title	Year	BEL
"Come With Me"	2013	41

=== Singles ===
Title	Year
Stockholm Tears	2010
The Last Native	2010
This Nation	2010
Velvet In Your Arms	2010
Swing Island	2010
World Cup	2010
Rainmaker	2010
This Blouse	2010
You Boom My Mind	2010
DiscoTek (with Daniel Portman)	2010
Feel the Force	2010
Sprinkle	2010
Spicy	2011
The Show	2011
8Bit Nighttrain (with Daniel Portman)	2011
Frutta Di Mare	2011
Economy	2011
Lapdance	2011
Saltwater	2011
Pasadena	2012
Blue Mondays	2012
Calling Ibiza	2012
Repique	2012
Aurelia	2012
Traverso	2012
Mykonos Summer Anthem	2012
Who Will Dance	2012
Anouska	2012
8Karat	2012
You Make Me Float	2012
Shine More (with Passenger 10)	2013
Come With Me	2013
Loneliness	2013
Norma Jean	2013
Sweet Melody	2013
Tanlines	2013
Lost in Time	2013
Remind Me	2013
You Are My Pride	2014
Higher in the Sun (featuring Penny Foster)	2014
True	2014
Let the Light In	2014
Uruguay (with Sons of Maria)	2014
Turn It Around	2015
Satisfy	2015
Cotton Fields (with Sons of Maria)	2015
U Got My Body	2015
Hope Rises	2015
Into the Wild	2015
Saltwater (2015 Rework)	2015
Morning Dew	2016
Better off That Way	2016
I Got to Do (with Redondo)	2016
Lake Arrowhead	2016
Zambia	2016
Sleeping in My Bed (with Sons of Maria)	2016
On the Beach	2016
Convincing	2016
Tell My Heart (featuring Dani Senior)	2016
Diving With Whales	2016
Waves	2017
Caught in the Act	2017
Make Me Love You	2017
Freedom Lives Within	2017
Tears in Your Eyes	2017
Fever	2017
Trailblazer	2017
Sphinx	2018
Don't Look Back	2018
Branches	2018
Roots	2018
Polynesia	2018
Harvesting	2018
Riverwards Stream	2018
Lioness	2018
We Found Love (with Ashibah)	2019
Birthright	2019
Heart Beating	2019
Fibonacci	2019
In the Air Tonight (with Lika Morgan)	2020
All I Need	2020
Wetlands	2020
Come Away (with Tim Morrison)	2020
Enchantment	2020
Aquatic	2021
Won't Leave Your Side	2021
Life On Hold	2021
Tantrum	2021
Sign of the Times	2021
Reminiscing	2022
Tribe of Kindness	2022

== Remixes ==
2013

- Calippo — "Spend Time Well" (Nora En Pure Remix)

2014

- Adrian Lux feat. Kaelyn Behr — "Sooner Or Later" (Nora En Pure Remix)
- Klingande — "Jubel" (Nora En Pure Remix)
- Croatia Squad and Calippo — "The Conductor" (Nora En Pure Remix)
- Dirty Vegas — "Setting Sun" (Nora En Pure Remix)

2015

- Me & My Toothbrush — "One Thing" (Nora En Pure Remix)
- Paul Harris feat. Dragonette — "One Night Lover" (Nora En Pure Remix)

2016

- Rüfüs Du Sol — "You Were Right" (Nora En Pure Remix)
- Kyle Watson — "Sink Deep" (Nora En Pure Club Remix)

2017

- Alok and Bruno Martini featuring Zeeba — "Hear Me Now" (EDX & Nora En Pure Remix)
- Milk & Sugar — "Music Is Moving" (Nora En Pure Remix)
- Blvk Jvck featuring Dyo — "Mind Games" (Nora En Pure Remix)

2018

- Why Don't We — "8 Letters" (Nora En Pure Remix)

2019

- Nora En Pure featuring Ashibah — "We Found Love" (Nora En Pure and Passenger 10 Remix)
- Sofi Tukker — "Fantasy" (Nora En Pure Remix)
- Eelke Kleijn featuring Ost — "Lost Souls" (Nora En Pure Remix)
- Above & Beyond and Seven Lions featuring Opposite The Other — "See the End" (Nora En Pure Remix)

2021

- Tove Lo - "Cool Girl" (Nora En Pure Remix)

2022

- Claptone featuring Dizzy - "Queen of Ice" (Nora En Pure Remix)
- Dom Dolla and Mansionair - "Strangers" (Nora En Pure Remix)
