= Trailblazer Travel Books =

American travel guidebooks

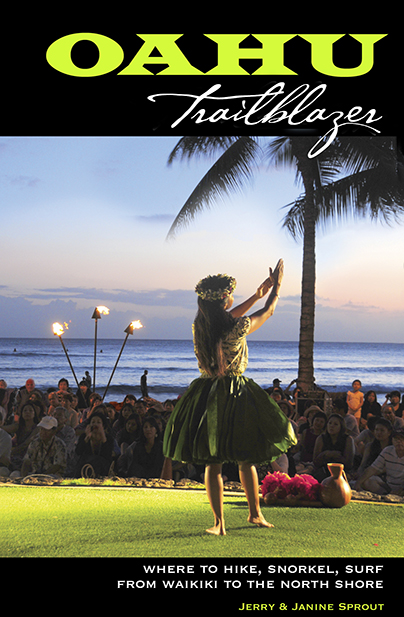
Cover of Oahu Trailblazer guidebook

Trailblazer Travel Books a series of ten recreational guides for the Hawaiian Islands. plus one each for Sierra Nevada, and San Francisco. They are published by California-based Diamond Valley Company and written by Janine and Jerry Sprout. In 2012, they published "No Worries Paris: A Photographic Walking Guide." Janine Sprout is of French heritage and has photographed the city over a period of decades. "No Worries Hawaii," is a vacation planning guide to all the Hawaiian Islands. Their most recent title is "Range of Light Trailblazer," a guide to camping, hiking, and touring from the Eastern Sierra and east through public lands to include Death Valley National Park

== Publications ==
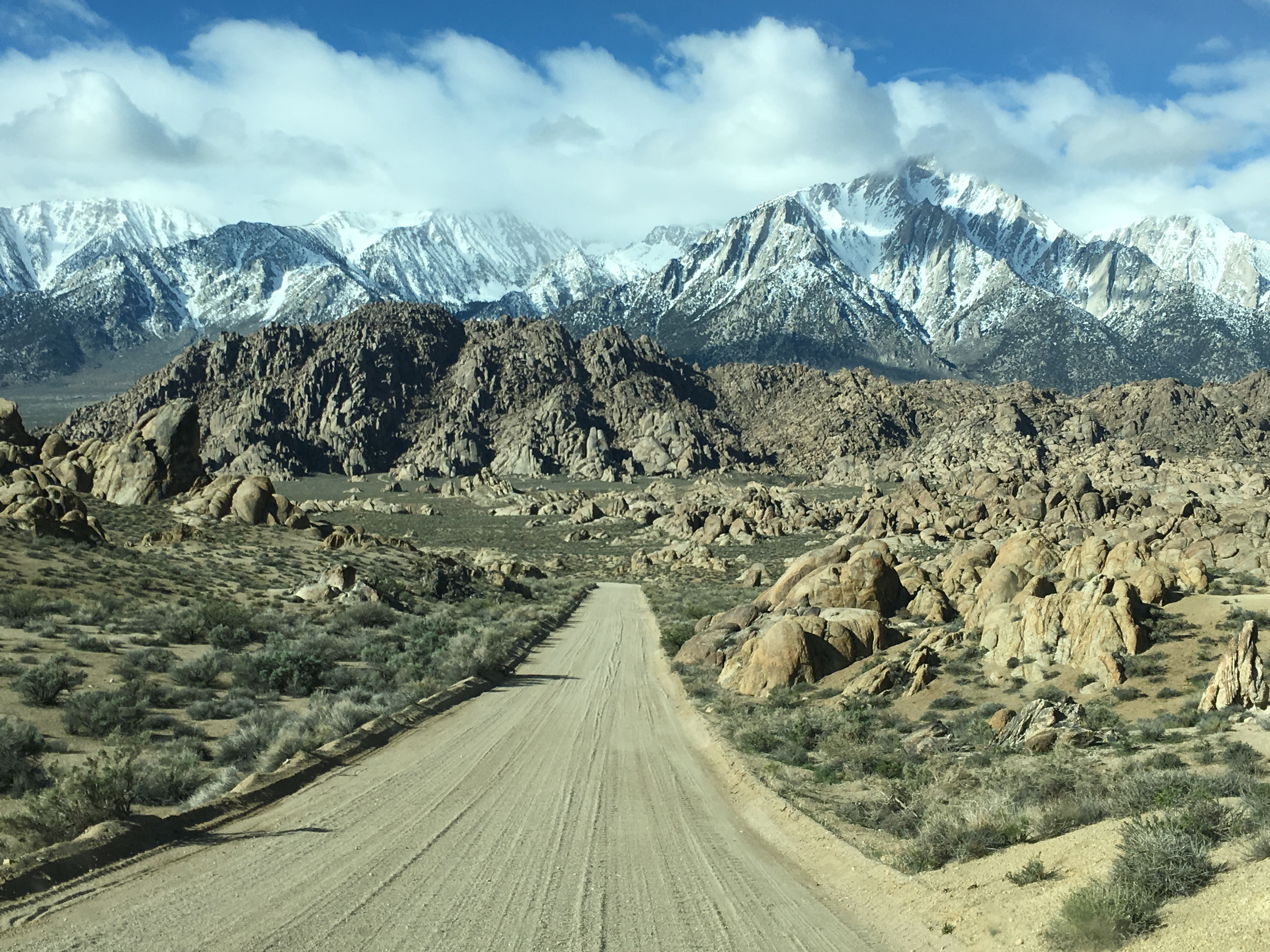
Main road winding through Alabama Hills, California under the shadow of Mount Whitney

The guides are aimed at the independent, adventurous travelers. The Sprouts have spent years developing the content and publish revised or new editions yearly. Aside from being well-organized resources for travelers, Trailblazers seek to support the economy based around cultural sites and recreational resources, thereby helping to preserve them.

The books are comprehensive when it comes to outdoor muscle-powered sports—hiking, biking, skiing, kayaking, snorkeling, and surfing. They also include historic town strolls, gardens, museums, popular tourist attractions, and archeological sites. Trailblazers also include standard guidebook fare, such as accommodations and restaurants, though they tend to limit this section to the top places. More than 200 photos and maps illustrate the text. They also publish, No Worries Hawaii, a vacation planning guide for Kauai, Oahu, Maui, and the Big Island, which, among other things, includes a "self-test" that allows readers unfamiliar with the Islands to select the locale that works best for them. Also in the series is "No Worries Paris: A Photographic Walking Guide."

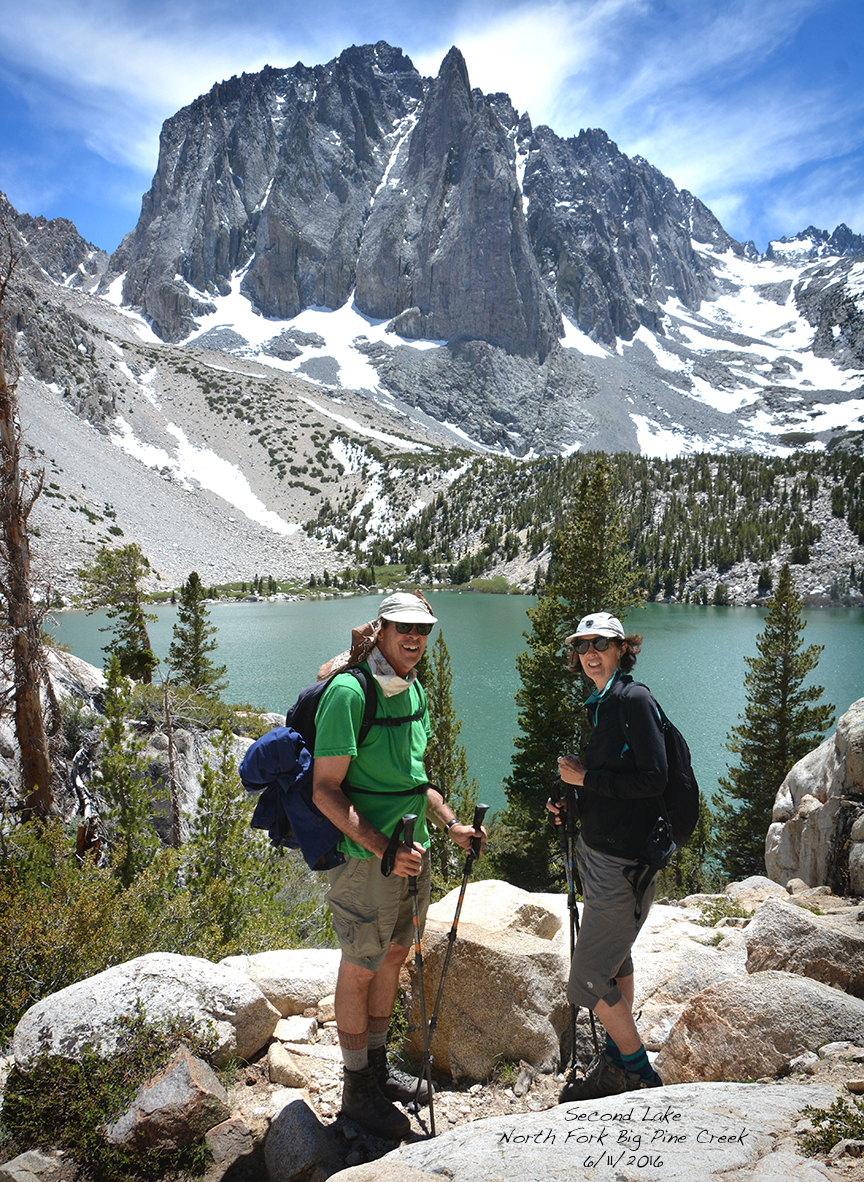
Jerry and Janine Sprout

In 2013, they published "Lifeguide: How to Get from Where You Are to Where You Want to Be," the company's first venture into the self-help genre. The most recent publication (2021) is "Range of Light Trailblazer: An Adventure Travel Guide from the High Sierra East to Death Valley."

== Authors ==
The Sprouts have traveled the American West together for more than thirty years. Janine, of French descent, is a photographer and a graphic designer whose work has included Harry Potter licensed products. She studied at UC Davis, California College of Arts and Crafts, Universita de Bella Arte (Perugia), and Oregon School of Arts & Crafts. She also headed the Nevada State Museum's public information department. Jerry is a Stanford graduate (football scholarship) who worked as a newspaper reporter in San Rafael, California. He is a former licensed psychologist who evaluated youth programs for several California counties, and later was an administrator at the largest private program for high-risk male juvenile offenders. His novel, American Boys Camp, was purchased by Universal Studios. Jerry Sprout is a native of Portland, Oregon; Janine was born in San Francisco.
