= Southampton Trailblazers =

- League: EBL Division 3 (South) (At the time of closing)
- Established: 2006
- Folded: 2008
- History: Southampton Trailblazers; 2006-2008
- Arena: Fleming Park Leisure Centre (Capacity: Unknown)
- Location: Southampton, England
- Team colours: Navy Blue / White
- Website: www.southamptontrailblazers.co.uk (No longer active)

The Southampton Trailblazers were a basketball club based in Southampton, England, which competed in the English Basketball League Division 3 (South) at the time of the club's demise. The clubs' home colours were navy blue and white, and their kits were manufactured by Erreà.

After years of operating a number of youth and community programmes, the Trailblazers were born when the club entered a senior men's team into the National leagues for the first time in 2006. Within their rookie season in EBL Division 4 (South-West), they had clinched the league title, with a 16-0 record, and promotion to Division 3 (South). After the demise of the Solent Stars in 2007, the Trailblazers became the leading club in Southampton, and were permitted to move from their St. Mary's home venue to Fleming Park Leisure Centre in Eastleigh.

However, the club were soon to meet the same fate as the Solent Stars, with the 2008/2009 English Basketball League season being the club's last, ending with an 11-13 win/loss record leaving them outside the playoff picture. Soon after the club's demise, the new Team Solent were founded in partnership with Southampton Solent University, to continue to develop basketball talent in the region.
