= Asia Overland =

Travel book by Mark Elliott and Wil Klass

- Author: Mark Elliott and Wil Klass
- Language: English
- Publisher: Trailblazer
- Publication date: 1998
- Pages: 567

Asia Overland by Mark Elliott and Wil Klass was a 1998 guidebook for backpackers in Asia and the former Soviet Union, out of print since 2002. It displayed practical information in a set of schematic 'treasure maps'
