= Championship Rally (1991 video game) =

- Australian cover art
- Developer(s): Human Entertainment
- Publisher(s): PAL: HAL Laboratory; JP: Kaken
- Platform(s): Nintendo Entertainment System
- Release: PAL: 1991; JP: April 24, 1992
- Genre(s): Racing
- Mode(s): Single-player

Championship Rally, known as Exciting Rally: World Rally Championship (エキサイティングラリー, Ekisaitingu Rarī) in Japan, is a 1991 racing video game published by HAL Laboratory and made for the Nintendo Entertainment System. This game was not released in North America and is considered semi-rare.

== Gameplay ==
The game features a variety of courses, weather and track conditions, and the ability to customize many of the player's cars features. Since it was a single-player only game, there was no need for two cars to be customized.
