= Cizeta =

Car manufacturer

Cizeta Automobili
- Company type: Private
- Industry: Automotive
- Founded: 1988
- Founder: Claudio Zampolli
- Defunct: 2021
- Headquarters: Fountain Valley, California, United States
- Key people: Claudio Zampolli; Giorgio Moroder; Marcello Gandini

Cizeta Automobili SRL was an Italian-American car manufacturer, originally headquartered in Modena, Italy, set up in the late 1980s by Claudio Zampolli, an Italian automotive engineer that previously worked as a test-and-development engineer at Lamborghini, in collaboration the music producer Giorgio Moroder.

== History ==
The name "Cizeta" comes from the Italian pronunciation of founder Claudio Zampolli's initials (C.Z.). Moroder became involved early into the project when he took his Lamborghini Countach for a service at Zampolli's garage. Their only product, the Cizeta-Moroder V16T, featured a technically advanced transverse-configured sixteen-cylinder engine. Styled by Marcello Gandini, the body was strikingly similar to the later Lamborghini Diablo's as Gandini first proposed the design to the then Chrysler-owned Lamborghini, which altered the concept significantly. Gandini then brought the original Diablo design to Cizeta. The prototype was the only car to carry the "Cizeta-Moroder" badge, as Giorgio Moroder pulled out of the Cizeta project in 1990. The prototype remained with Giorgio Moroder for over thirty years, when, in early 2022, he sold it.

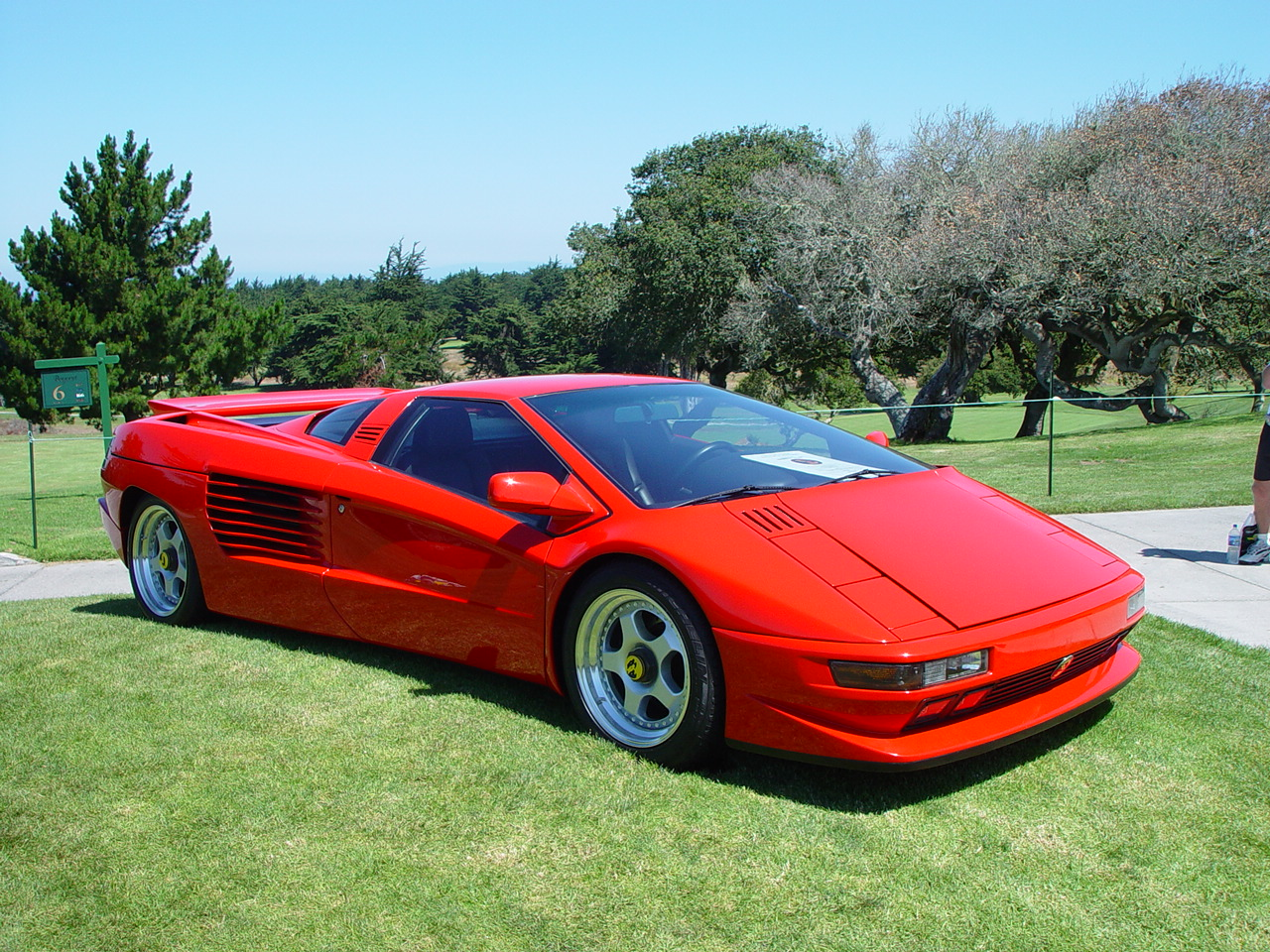
Cizeta-Moroder V16T

No production Cizeta was ever badged "Cizeta-Moroder" but merely "Cizeta V16T". Only 8 cars (including the prototype) were built before the shutdown and relocation of the firm from Modena to Fountain Valley in 1995. Subsequently, 3 more cars were completed (two coupes, and one spyder) in 1999 and 2003.

== Refoundation ==
Mr. Zampolli moved to the US after the company went bankrupt in Italy and set up a new company in California, called Cizeta Automobili USA. He serviced exotic cars and continued to build (on demand) the Cizeta V16T.

In one instance, a Cizeta was seized by the U.S. Immigration and Customs Enforcement on December 7, 2009.

Zampolli died on July 7, 2021, at age 82.
