= Blazer (surname) =

Blazer is a surname. Notable people with the surname include:

- Chuck Blazer (1945–2017), American soccer administrator
- Craig Blazer, soccer coach at DePaul University, USA
- Dan Blazer (born 1944), American psychiatrist
- Phil Blazer (born 1936), former American football offensive guard
- Yitzchak Blazer (1837–1907), early leader in the Musar movement
