= Trailblazer (video game) =

1986 video game

- Commodore 64/128 cover art
- Developer: Mr. Chip Software
- Publishers: Gremlin Graphics; Mindscape
- Designer: Shaun Southern
- Programmers: Commodore 64; Shaun Southern; Ports; Shaun Hollingworth; Peter M. Harrap; Chris Kerry; Colin Dooley
- Platforms: Commodore 64, C16 / Plus/4, Atari 8-bit, Amstrad CPC, Atari ST, MSX, ZX Spectrum, Gizmondo, PlayStation 3, PlayStation Portable, Vita
- Release: 1986
- Genre: Racing
- Mode: Single-player

Trailblazer is a 1986 racing video game developed by Mr. Chip Software and published by Gremlin Graphics for the ZX Spectrum, Commodore 64, Atari 8-bit computers, Amstrad CPC, Commodore 16 and Plus/4, followed by an Atari ST port a year later.

A sequel, Cosmic Causeway: Trailblazer II, was released in 1987. A remake for the Gizmondo was released in 2005 and followed by an adaptation for the PlayStation 3, PlayStation Portable and PlayStation Vita in 2011 as part of the PlayStation mini series.

== Gameplay ==
The ball gets thrown out of a hole between some green speedup squares; blue jump squares lie ahead.

Trailblazer is a racing game which players control a football along a series of suspended passages. The game can be played either in time trial or arcade mode and four track. The races usually last between 15 and 45 seconds. Special fields on the track let the ball jump (blue), slow down (red), speed up (green) or warp speed the ball (white), invert the controls (cyan/light blue), bounce it backwards (purple) or are holes (black).

== Development ==
Trailblazer was heavily inspired by the arcade video game Metrocross.

== Reception ==
Reception

Review scores
Publication	Score
Your Sinclair	9
Dragon	5/5 (C64)
Zzap!64	93% (C64)

Zzap!64's reviewers thought the game was "an excellent variation on the race game theme". The overall rating given was 93%, qualifying the C64 version for the magazine's Sizzler award. Steve Panak, reviewing the Atari 8-bit version for ANALOG Computing, concluded that "the game is the most original arcade action wristbuster to come down the pike in a long time, and one of the best two-player competition games I've seen". Avery Score for GameSpot said that the game was one of the more unique and enjoyable of the launch games they seen. It received a Your Sinclair Megagame award.
