= Cizeta-Moroder V16T =

Sports car produced by Cizeta

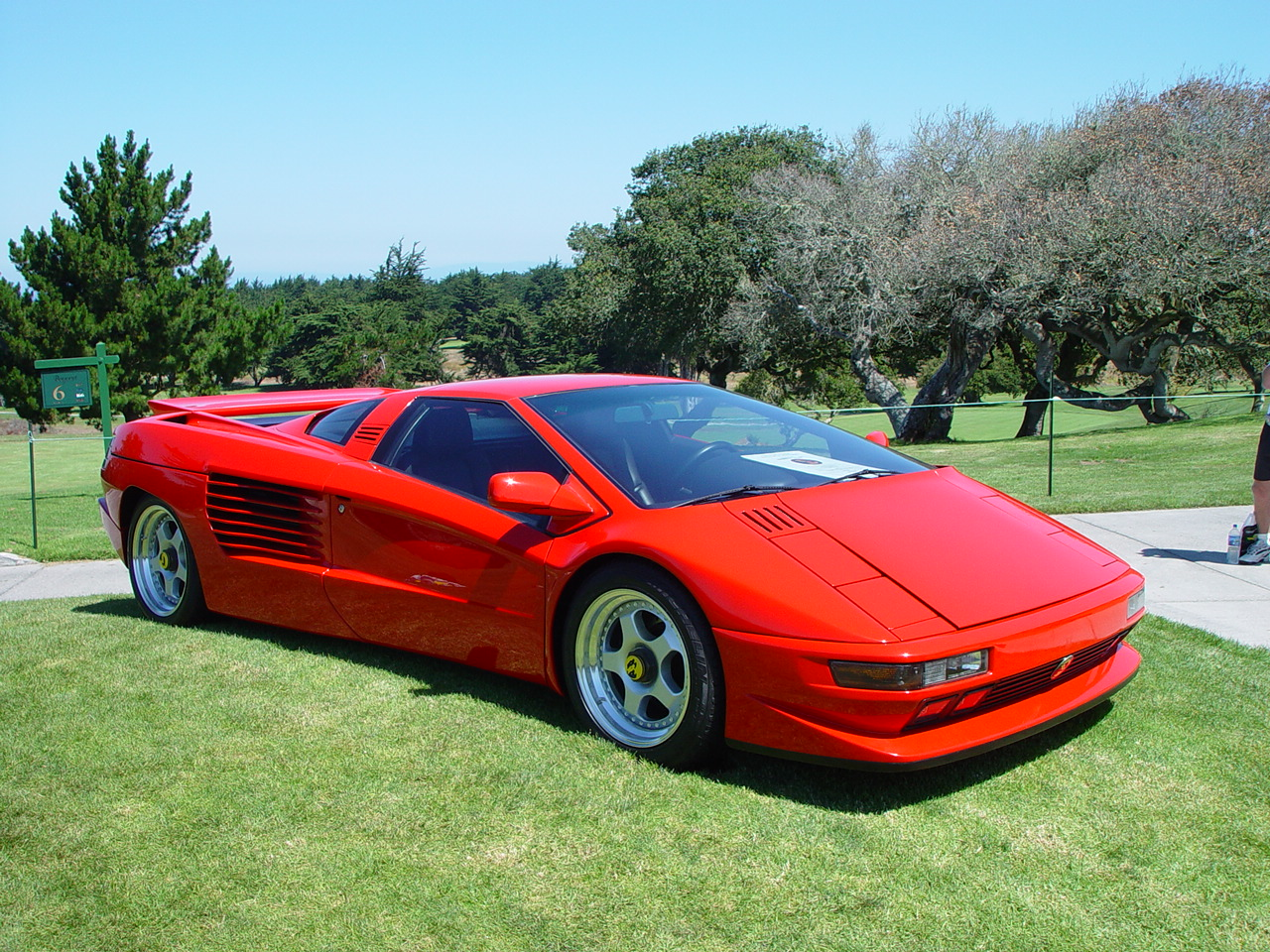

Overview
- Manufacturer: Cizeta Automobili
- Production: 1991–2003 (11 produced, including one Prototype and one Spyder)
- Designer: Marcello Gandini

Body and chassis
- Class: Sports car
- Body style: 2-door coupé; 2-door roadster
- Layout: Rear mid-engine, rear-wheel-drive
- Related: Lamborghini Urraco

Powertrain
- Engine: 6.0 L V16
- Transmission: 5-speed ZF S5-42 manual

Dimensions
- Wheelbase: 2,689.9 mm (105.9 in)
- Length: 4,493.3 mm (176.9 in)
- Width: 2,052.3 mm (80.8 in)
- Height: 1,104.9 mm (43.5 in)
- Curb weight: 1,701.0 kg (3,750 lb) (prototype)

The Cizeta-Moroder V16T, now simply known as the Cizeta V16T, is an Italian-American sports car (built from 1991 to 1995 in Modena, Italy and from 1999 to 2003 in Fountain Valley, California) developed by automotive engineer Claudio Zampolli in a joint venture with music composer Giorgio Moroder and designed by Marcello Gandini. It was the only product of the Cizeta company. It was developed by a group of ex-Lamborghini employees and initially introduced in Los Angeles in December 1988.

== History ==
The Cizeta-Moroder name comes from the Italian pronunciation of founder and designer Claudio Zampolli's initials (C. Z. – Chi-Zeta). Zampolli worked as a test and development engineer at Lamborghini before starting his own business of selling and maintaining high-performance sports cars. The V16T was conceived out of his desire to have his initials on a sports car. He made a partnership venture with his long time customer Giorgio Moroder, an Oscar winning music composer, who regularly came to his shop to have his Lamborghini Countach serviced after learning that the two shared similar interests in automobiles. Moroder was a 50% stakeholder in the new joint venture. Zampolli selected a team of former Lamborghini employees to develop the car which included Oliviero Pedrazzi as the chief engineer and engine designer, and Achille Bevini along with Ianose Bronzatti as in-charge of the suspension and the chassis. Giancarlo Guerra, a former craftsman of Scaglietti body works who was famous for coach-making the body of the Ferrari 250 GTO along with devising economical ways to make the chassis of the Lamborghini Countach when he worked at Lamborghini, was tasked to build the body of the car for the initial production run.

The original and unique Cizeta-Moroder prototype and show car, chassis 001, was sold at a Sotheby's auction for $1,363,500.

== Specifications ==
The V16T signifies that its engine is a 16-cylinder engine having the two banks of cylinders arranged in a V configuration and mounted transversely in the central rear position, just forward of the rear axle and behind the passenger seats. It shares a single aluminum cylinder block, with four cylinder heads with gearing between themselves, providing a single output from the center of the engine assembly to the five-speed transaxle. The engine is based on the Lamborghini Urraco's 90° DOHC flat-plane V8 with which it shares a number of parts including the separate heads. The central output also allowed chief engineer Oliviero Pedrazzi to retain the Urraco's crankshaft(s). The Bosch K-Jetronic fuel injection systems from the V8 engines were retained for supplying fuel to the engine. The resulting engine has 64 valves, eight overhead camshafts (instead of the conventional long four camshafts) and has a capacity of 6.0 L (5,995 cc) having a compression ratio of 9.3 to 1. The engine produces a peak power output of 540 hp (550 PS; 400 kW) at 8,000 rpm and 540 N⋅m (400 lb⋅ft) of torque at 6,000 rpm. The decision to use a V16 engine was taken to make the car unique and due to Zampolli's fascination of large and powerful automobiles.

The prototype had a curb weight of 1,701.0 kg (3,750 lb), with Zampolli stating that he aimed for the production car to weigh 1,406.1 kg (3,100 lb). At the front, the V16T has unequal-length control arms connected to specially designed light-alloy upright joints. The spring-damper units developed by Koni are attached to the control arms conventionally; the suspension arms, connected by an adjustable anti-roll bar, are angled forward to provide anti-dive. The car also uses unequal-length control arms at the rear with the difference being that the twin set of spring-damper units are mounted 250 mm (10 in) inboard of the rear wheels. Each unit is actuated by a bell crank from a linkage that attaches to the lower end of the hub carrier. The brakes have drilled and slotted rotors all around and use twin-pot calipers developed by Brembo. The wheels have race-style hubs that have five locating pegs and a large central nut to secure the wheel. The five-spoke, two-piece, cast-aluminum OZ Racing wheels are fitted with 245/40ZR-17 Pirelli P Zero tyres up front and 335/35ZR-17s at the rear.

== Design ==
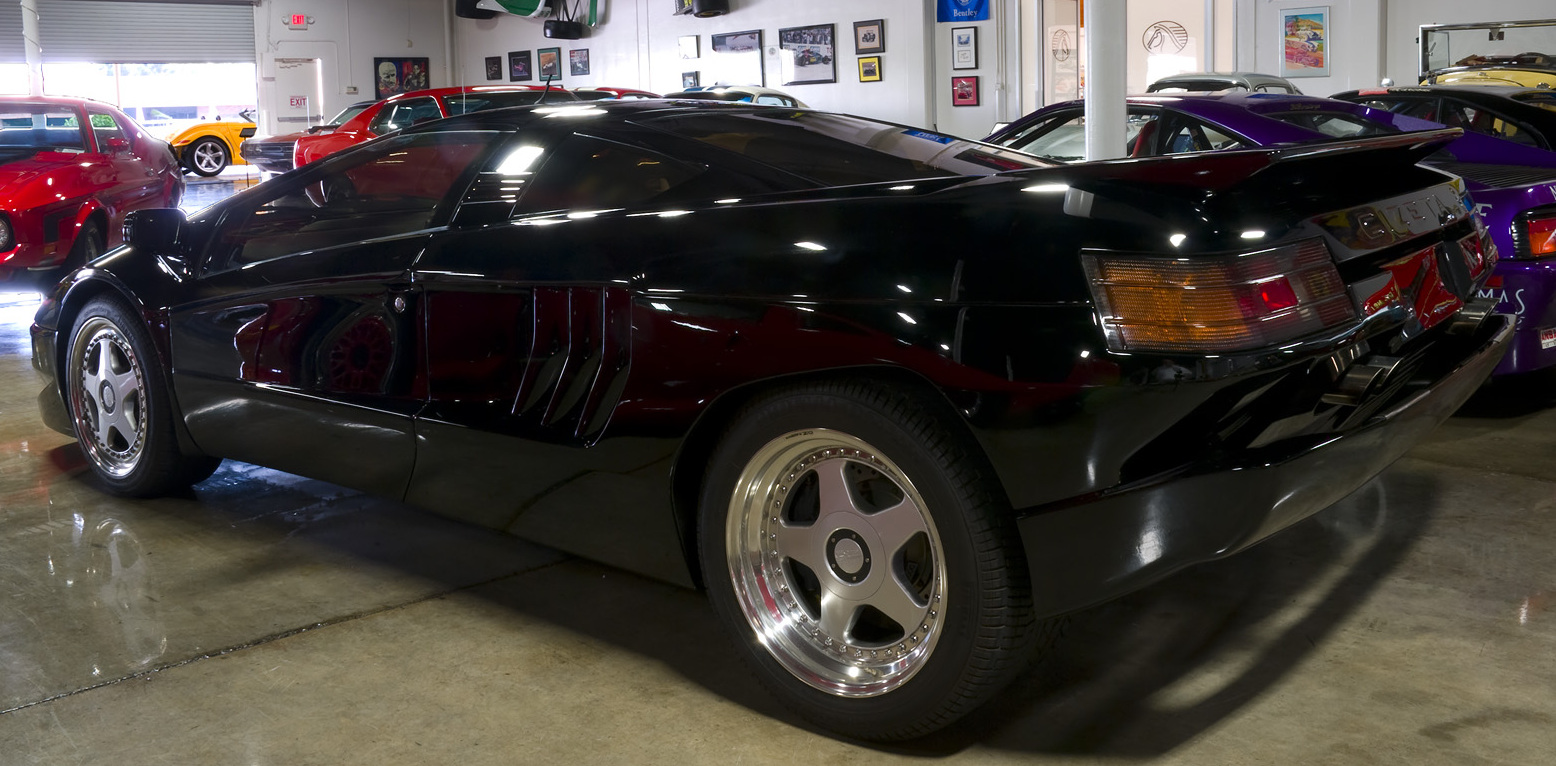
Rear view

The chassis was made of chrome-moly elliptical steel tubing, wrapped in a sleek body designed by Marcello Gandini, who had previously designed the Lamborghini Countach and some aerodynamic Maseratis, and Claudio Zampolli. The front nose shape of the V16T is from the original design for the Lamborghini Diablo by Marcello Gandini. Gandini initially wanted to reuse the original design he intended for the Diablo but Zampolli was unimpressed by the rear of the design. As a result, only the front of the car has the said design with the rear having design changes made by Zampolli himself. In a notable design choice, the V16T is the only production car to be equipped with four separate pop-up headlights, two stacked vertically on either side, while the rear lights are borrowed from the Alpine A610.

== Performance and production ==
The V16T achieved a top speed of 328 km/h (204 mph) and could accelerate from 0 to 100 km/h (62 mph) in 4 seconds.

Only one prototype bearing the Cizeta-Moroder name was manufactured before the partnership dissolved. The car which was finished in a pearl white exterior color with a red leather interior remained in the possession of Moroder and underwent a full restoration by Canepa in 2018, after which it was auctioned in January 2022.

In 1991, the list price for a Cizeta was an estimated (US dollars) $300,000. Although predictions for production foresaw one car per month, only eight examples (including one prototype) were actually built from 1991 to 1995, before the company moved its operation from Modena, Italy to Fountain Valley, California. The financial slowdown in the mid 1990s coupled with the car's failure to comply with the US road-car regulations and the high asking price restricted production to a made-to-order basis. Subsequently, three more cars were completed (two coupes and one spyder) in 1999 and 2003. The car made in 2003 was a convertible variant of the V16T called the Cizeta Fenice TTJ Spyder completed on a special request from a Japanese customer.

As of May 1, 2006, the car was reportedly still in production on a made-to-order basis, although now priced at $650,000, or $850,000 for the Spyder TTJ, exclusive of shipping, taxes, and extras. According to a 2018 interview, Zampolli considered the car still theoretically in production and available to purchase as late as 2018, although none had been built since the 2003 spyder. Zampolli died on July 7, 2021, at age 82.

== Moroder's involvement ==
At some point after the car's debut, Giorgio Moroder and Claudio Zampolli parted ways over a dispute on slow production of the car due its production process which required a large amount of labor hours to complete, materials for the body panels as well as the use of the powerplant. Moroder wanted the car to have a body work constructed from fiberglass and devised the use of a BMW powerplant in place of the bespoke V16 unit installed in the car in order to speed up the production process, which initiated the split as these suggestions conflicted with Zampolli's vision for the car. It is known that Claudio Zampolli designed the logo for the car, and Giorgio Moroder paid for the art development. The Cizeta, from 1990 to date, is no longer associated with Moroder; its name remains symbolic of Moroder's hi-tech music and glamorous lifestyle. In addition, while the car debuted (temporarily) as the Cizeta-Moroder, all customer cars were badged simply as Cizeta V16T.
