= Kid Chaos (video game) =

1994 video game

- Cover artwork for the Amiga release
- Developer(s): Magnetic Fields
- Publisher(s): Ocean Software
- Programmer(s): Shaun Southern
- Artist(s): Andrew Morris
- Composer(s): Pipe Smoker's Cough - Daniel Davies / Rob Fenn
- Platform(s): Amiga; Amiga CD32
- Release: 1994
- Genre(s): Platform

Kid Chaos (previously known as Kid Vicious) is a side-scrolling platform video game developed by Magnetic Fields, and published by Ocean Software, for the Amiga and Amiga CD32 in 1994.

Former Magnetic Fields artist Andrew Morris agreed for a scan of his original protagonist concept artwork to be included. This was the first time it had been revealed to the public. 'Cosmic Kitten' (alternatively 'Claws'), as he was then known, was to be the Amiga's answers to Sonic the Hedgehog. However, before publication, the character was re-designed as a caveboy known simply as 'Kid' to avoid any legal conflict with Sega.
