= Mark Elliott (British author) =

British writer

Mark Elliott is an English travel writer best known for books on Azerbaijan,.He and Wil Klass wrote Asia Overland.
