= Rally Championship (series) =

- Genre: Racing
- Developers: Red Rat Software; Pixelkraft; Magnetic Fields; Warthog Games
- Publishers: Europress; SCi Games (2002)
- Platforms: Atari ST, Amiga, MS-DOS, PC-98, FM Towns, Windows, PlayStation, PlayStation 2, GameCube
- First release: Lombard RAC Rally; 1988
- Latest release: Rally Championship; 2002

Rally Championship or Rally is a series of loosely related racing video games focused on rallying created by British magazine Europress (the software division earlier known as Mandarin Software and later as Actualize). The series began in 1988 with Lombard RAC Rally (officially licensed game based on what is now known as the Wales Rally GB) and ended after the release of the eponymous console-only Rally Championship in 2002.

As of 1999, more than 1 million copies of Rally games had been sold.

== Premise ==
The series is in the genre of racing simulation in the field of real-life rallying and was the first of its kind. The games feature real-life tracks and all of them also have licensed rally cars from major manufacturers.

== Games ==
Game	Year	Platform	Content
Lombard RAC Rally	1988	Atari ST, Amiga	RAC Rally
Network Q RAC Rally	1993	MS-DOS, PC-98, FM Towns	RAC Rally
Network Q RAC Rally Championship	1996	MS-DOS	RAC Rally
International Rally Championship	1997	Windows, PlayStation	Unlicensed international
Mobil 1 British Rally Championship/2000	1999	Windows, PlayStation	British Rally Championship
Rally Championship Xtreme	2001	Windows	Unlicensed international
Rally Championship	2002	PlayStation 2, GameCube	Unlicensed international
