= Lotus (video game series) =

The Lotus series consists of three racing computer games based around the Lotus brand: Lotus Esprit Turbo Challenge, Lotus Turbo Challenge 2, and Lotus III: The Ultimate Challenge. Published between 1990 and 1992 by Gremlin Graphics, the games gained very favourable reviews upon release. Original Amiga versions of the games were created by Shaun Southern and Andrew Morris of Magnetic Fields, and then ported by other individuals to several other computers and game consoles.

== Lotus Esprit Turbo Challenge ==
Lotus Esprit Turbo Challenge
- Amiga screenshot
- Developer: Magnetic Fields
- Publisher: Gremlin Graphics
- Composers: Shaun Southern, Andrew Morris
- Platforms: Amiga, Amiga CD32 (part of Lotus Trilogy), Amstrad CPC, Atari ST, Commodore 64, ZX Spectrum
- Release: 1990
- Genre: Racing
- Modes: Single-player, multiplayer

The first game in the series was released in 1990 on 8-bit and 16-bit computer systems. The game allowed the player to race a Lotus Esprit Turbo SE car through several (32 in the Amiga version) circuit race tracks of varying scenery. Two player simultaneous play (with split screen) was also provided, and a choice of audio tracks to accompany races.

Each track is lap-based and consists of turns of varying degrees, as well as hills and hollows which slow down or speed up the car passing through them. Each turn is indicated by a chain of road-side signs, and the difficulty of the turn is reflected by the number and density of these signs - a feature common to all titles in the Lotus series.

While racing, the players must manage their fuel supply, occasionally visiting the pit stop for refuelling. Also apart from overtaking the other cars, the racers must avoid various hazards and obstacles. These are dependent on the scenery the track is located in, and include slippery road on the winter courses, road blocks, slippery puddles and wooden logs.

The tracks are split into three race series, with different difficulty levels. In each race the player or players compete against 20 opponents. The goal is to finish each race on the highest possible position; if the player finishes a race within the first 10 places they qualify for the next race and receive points towards a final position on the high-score table. The names of the computer-controlled drivers are puns on the names of real-life racers of the time ("Ayrton Sendup", "Nijel Mainsail" and "Alain Phosphate" for example).

Unusually, the player's starting position in each race is the exact opposite of the position reached at the end of the previous one. This gives weaker players a chance to improve by starting in a higher position.

In the Amiga version entering "MONSTER" and "SEVENTEEN" as names of players 1 and 2 respectively, reveals a hidden mini-game - a simple space-themed shooter, where the objective is to survive as long as possible while shooting rocks that fly around.

=== Reception ===
Lotus Esprit Turbo Challenge was well received by the gaming press, which praised its feeling of speed, technical quality and two-player gameplay. The game in all its versions was rated around 80-90%. It was the only title in the series that was released for an 8-bit platform - the later ones were 16-bit only.

The ZX Spectrum version was voted number 17 in the Your Sinclair Readers' Top 100 Games of All Time.

== Lotus Turbo Challenge 2 ==
Lotus Turbo Challenge 2
- Amiga screenshot
- Developers: Magnetic Fields; Gremlin Graphics (Lotus Turbo Challenge for the Sega Genesis)
- Publishers: Gremlin Graphics; Electronic Arts (Lotus Turbo Challenge for the Sega Genesis)
- Composer: Barry Leitch
- Platforms: Amiga, Amiga CD32 (part of Lotus Trilogy), Atari ST, Acorn Archimedes, Sega Mega Drive
- Release: 1991
- Genre: Racing
- Modes: Single-player, multiplayer

The second Lotus game shifted focus to arcade-oriented gameplay. Being the first of the series released for a game console (for the Sega Mega Drive under the title Lotus Turbo Challenge), the fuel limit and difficulty levels were dropped, and the lap-based levels were replaced with course-based time trials (not unlike arcade games such as Out Run), with the player required to complete each course within a specified time to qualify for the next one.

In addition to the Esprit Turbo SE, Lotus Turbo Challenge 2 also featured the Lotus Elan SE, hence 'Esprit' being dropped from the title. There was no choice of car however; the player runs with the Elan on odd levels, and with the Esprit on even levels.

Lotus 2's single-player mode uses all of the game screen instead of half, and opponent cars appear in a variety of colors (opponent cars in the original game were all white). The music is absent from racing altogether; the player instead hears the car's engine sound.

Lotus 2 was developed for the Amiga and then converted for the other platforms.

Barry Leitch's intro music for Lotus 2 is often found on playlists of retro computer music webradio stations; it contains a subliminal message in the form of a sampled voice at around the 12-second mark (played through the left channel only) which says "you will not copy this game". The sample is played very quietly during the first few bars, and can be easily accessed in any MOD tracker program. The hi-hat and voice sample at the very beginning of the main theme is taken from Yello's Oh Yeah, a song that became famous as the theme for another sports car (a Ferrari 250 GT California) in the movie Ferris Bueller's Day Off.

Lotus 2 uses a password system to access different races - once the player qualifies for a particular race, the password is revealed. Additionally, a rendition of Shaun Southern's early creation Kwazy Kwaks, originally published for the VIC-20 in 1984, is accessed by using the password "DUX".

There is a touch of humour on level six (the motorway level) of the Amiga version: if the player manages to successfully drive under the trailer of one of the lorries that cross the road, the in-game announcer shouts "Yeehaa!" This sound was used as a taunt on the Genesis port.

The Amiga and Atari ST versions are able to use the serial port and connect to another computer (the players could link 2 Amiga, 2 Atari ST or an Amiga and an Atari ST) running Lotus 2, thus making it possible for three or four players to play at the same time, or two players to play in fullscreen mode. This feature does not exists in other versions, nor in the two other episodes.

== Lotus III: The Ultimate Challenge ==
The third game in the series combined the gameplay aspects of its predecessors, allowing players to choose between racing opponents of Lotus Turbo Challenge or the arcade-like time trials of Lotus 2. The two-player option was retained and the music selection feature returns (Patrick Phelan's soundtrack to Lotus III spawned many modern remixes). Lotus III also added a third car - a concept Lotus M200 automobile - and allowed the player to choose which one to race with. The game recycled most of the graphics from Lotus 2, but added a number of new sceneries. The third installment also contains a quasi-track constructor where it is possible to create a track based on set parameters. As a result, the player receives a level code using which it is possible to create the whole multi-track race. The game also enables the player to input any random numbers and letters and based on them have a race on a completely random track.

== Lotus Trilogy ==
In 1994, the three games were released for Amiga CD32 in one package, as The Classic Lotus Trilogy. The Lotus Trilogy was also released for Atari 1040ST and Amiga that included all three games.

=== Reception ===
Italian magazine Computer+Videogiochi scored the Amiga CD32 version 82.

== See also ==
- Turbo Esprit
- Top Gear
