= Cosmic Causeway: Trailblazer II =

1987 video game

Cosmic Causeway
- Publisher: Gremlin Interactive
- Platform: Commodore 64
- Release: 1987

Cosmic Causeway is the sequel to the video game Trailblazer written by Shaun Southern. While the original game featured a split-screen two player mode, the sequel is single-player only. The display is a full screen 3D view of the "road" ahead. Another major change is the addition of tunnels, with the player able to roll along upside down if the necessary icon has been selected.

== Gameplay ==
The player controls a ball that is being affected by the coloured squares on the road:

- Black squares are holes, and the ball will fall through them, wasting valuable time.
- Red squares slow the ball down.
- Green squares speed the ball up slightly and make it jump.
- Blue squares make the ball jump higher.
- Purple squares stop the ball and send it backwards.
- Cyan/turquoise squares reverse the controls, making things more difficult.

On each level there is a glowing ball to collect for credits. At the start of the level these could be spent to add an extra feature to the ball, shown by the icons at the bottom of the screen:

- x3 – x3 score multiplier (2 credits).
- Ceiling – let the ball jump to the "ceiling" of the level and roll along it (3 credits).
- Stop cyan – prevents controls being reversed (4 credits).
- Stop purple – stop purple squares halting the ball (4 credits).
- Superspeed – accelerates the ball to a higher speed (5 credits).
- Shield – kills enemies on contact (6 credits).
- Float – stops the ball falling through holes (7 credits).
- Time slow – slows down the timer (7 credits).

On many levels there are enemies to be shot, by holding the joystick forward. At the end of certain levels are large enemy dragons, inspired by the game Space Harrier, which must be destroyed before the time runs out. Other hazards include large yellow walls with doors that open and close.

A timer ticks down constantly, and only stops when the player reaches the grey tiles that mark the end of a level. Remaining time is carried over to the next level, and a bonus score awarded based on the number of seconds left. The timer is reset after each dragon level.

There are 24 levels in total. At the end of the game a rating is awarded, from Hilarious to Superblazer for completing the game.

== Reception ==
In 1990, Dragon gave the game 3 out of 5 stars, stating that "it has 24 'roads' to travel; quite interesting".

Zzap!64 were impressed by the game describing it as "a technically superb game that's both visually impressive and fun to play". It received an overall rating of 93%.
