= National Environmental Balancing Bureau =

Founded in 1971 and headquartered in Gaithersburg, Maryland, USA, the National Environmental Balancing Bureau (NEBB) is an international association certifying firms and qualifying supervisors and technicians in the following disciplines: Testing, Adjusting, and Balancing (TAB) of HVAC systems; Building Systems Commissioning (BSC); Sound and Vibration Measurement (S&V); Retro-commissioning (RCX); Fumehood Testing (FHT); and Cleanroom Performance Testing (CPT). NEBB also establishes and maintains industry standards, procedures, and work specifications for these disciplines.

NEBB Logo

== Administration ==
In November 2023, NEBB announced the hiring of Luis Chinchilla as the president of the organization. Being Costa Rican, he is the first Latin American NEBB president.

== Programs ==
Discipline committees, consisting of highly experienced field professionals, set guidelines and standards for NEBB disciplines. As of January 2007, NEBB has the following discipline committees: Testing, Adjusting, and Balancing; Building Systems Commissioning; Sound and Vibration Measurement; Fumehood Testing; and Cleanroom Performance Testing.

== Fumehood Testing (FHT) and Retro-Commissioning (RCX) Programs ==
NEBB's FHT and RCX programs were established at a NEBB Board of Directors' meeting held at NEBB's 2006 Annual Meeting and Educational Conference in Palm Springs, California on November 9–11, 2006. NEBB's FHT Committee is working to produce a FHT procedural standards text and plans to offer a seminar in FHT in Fall 2007. NEBB's BSC Committee is producing a seminar in RCX to be offered in Fall 2007.

== Certification Requirements ==
In addition to being affiliated with a local NEBB chapter, NEBB firms are required to have been in business for at least 12 months and enjoy a reputation of integrity and responsible performance. They also must possess sophisticated instruments required for their discipline, which must be calibrated in accordance with NEBB guidelines. In addition, the firm must employ at least one supervisor—who meets NEBB qualifications—to represent the firm and be responsible for the firm's work. Finally, NEBB firms are required to possess a copy of the NEBB procedural standards for their discipline.

== Publications ==
NEBB publishes home study courses, technical manuals, and training materials for industry use. Below is a list of current NEBB publications:

- NEBB Procedural Standards for Testing, Adjusting and Balancing of Environmental Systems (7th Edition, 2005)*
- Testing, Adjusting and Balancing Manual for Technicians (2nd Edition, 1997)
- Environmental Systems Technology (2nd Edition, 1999)
- Testing, Adjusting and Balancing Study Course for Supervisors (3rd Edition, 2001)
- Testing, Adjusting and Balancing Study Course for Technicians (2002)
- Procedural Standards for Building Systems Commissioning (2nd Edition, 1999)
- Design Phase Commissioning Handbook (2005)*
- NEBB Procedural Standards for the Measurement and Assessment of Sound and Vibration (2nd Edition, 2006)
- Sound and Vibration Design and Analysis (1st Edition, 1994)
- Study Course for Measuring Sound and Vibration (2nd Edition, 1996)
- Procedural Standards for Certified Testing of Cleanrooms (2nd Edition 1996)
- Study Course for Certified Testing of Cleanrooms (2nd Edition, 1998)

Note: * also available in CD-ROM

== Educational Programs ==
In addition to its publications, NEBB offers educational seminars at NEBB TEC—NEBB's training and educational facility located in Tempe, Arizona—to enhance the educational experience of each discipline.

Each November, NEBB hosts its Annual Meeting and Educational Conference. The meeting features technical sessions and prominent guest speakers to enhance the professional capabilities of NEBB contractors and staff members. Educational sessions at the meeting feature presentations by industry experts on various topics related to the NEBB disciplines. Past invited guest speakers have included the presidents of the American Society of Heating, Refrigerating and Air Conditioning Engineers (ASHRAE) and Mechanical Contractors Association of America (MCAA).

== NEBB TEC ==
NEBB TEC (Training and Educational Center) is a multi-purpose facility used for seminars and practical exams. Managed by NEBB's technical director, the facility has two cleanrooms, a seminar classroom, and a TAB practical exam room complete with an air handler and pumps.
