= Proof of Destruction =

1987 video game

- Publisher: Mastertronic
- Programmer: Shaun Southern
- Composer: Shaun Southern
- Platforms: Commodore 64, Commodore 16, ZX Spectrum
- Release: NA: 1987; EU: 1987
- Genre: Fixed shooter
- Modes: Single player, multiplayer

Proof of Destruction (P.O.D.) is a fixed shooter for the Commodore 64 and Commodore 16 written by Shaun Southern and published by Mastertronic in 1987. The player spaceship moves along the bottom of a grid, attempting to shoot enemy spaceships to go to the next level.

== Gameplay ==
Proof of Destruction has a unique way of player movement and strategy, but has simple enemy AI. It consists of various levels where in each level the objective is to kill a fixed number of spaceships that come into the grid. Points are gained for every enemy kill. There is an overall time limit to the game and the objective is to obtain as many points as possible within that time limit, with the user trying to finish off each level as quickly as possible.

=== Movement ===
A player spaceship(s) can move freely horizontally and vertically on a fixed grid that fills the whole screen, using the keyboard or a joystick. The grid, however, gets damaged by enemy bullets which prevent the player from moving over them during a short period of time.

Several types of enemies exist and each one moves in a distinct way. In the basic levels, enemies usually enter from the top of the grid and move horizontally, lowering one line at a time when they reach the side of the grid and reversing their direction, slowly closing in on to the player spaceship. Further on, other types of enemies are introduced that choose the shortest path towards the player, although moving much slower, and other enemies that enter the grid rapidly from the left and the right and disappear back of the grid as quickly as they came.

=== Attack ===
A player spaceship can fire off bullets only in one direction, namely upwards, trying to destroy its enemies. Those enemies fire off bullets in all directions, usually aimed at either one of the players.

Enemy bullets depend on the type of enemy and can range from simple downward bullets to bullets that cross the grid in any direction.

=== Level completion ===
Each level had the same sized grid with the player spaceships starting at the bottom of the grid and a number of enemy spaceships entering from different sides of the grid, depending on the level and on the enemy type. Completion of a level is reached when a timer has finished counting down. After the completion of a level, the player receives an extra life, up to a maximum of five.

=== Multiplayer ===
At the start of the game, it is possible to choose between one or two players. Both players move independently on the grid and cannot hit nor block each other. If one player loses all of their lives, the other one can continue.

== Legacy ==
A remake, Point of Destruction, was released for the Gizmondo in 2005.
