= Atari User =

- Cover of the December 1986 issue. It contains the Atari ST User supplement (see top right).
- Categories: Computer magazine
- Publisher: Database Publications
- First issue: 1985
- Final issue: 1988
- Country: United Kingdom

Atari User was a British computer magazine aimed at users of Atari home computers, and published by Database Publications (later known as Europress) between 1985 and 1988.

Atari User was a general-interest computer magazine, containing games reviews as well as type-in programs, tutorials and hardware projects. As with Database's other publications, its appearance was somewhat conservative in comparison with its more games-oriented contemporaries, such as Computer and Video Games (C&VG). The editorial style was equally restrained and relatively formal. Andre Willey was one of the early editors of this magazine after being promoted from Technical Editor.

== History ==
Early editions primarily focused on the Atari 8-bit computers (400/800/XL/XE) and the newly launched Atari ST range (although they included news of other Atari products such as the relaunched Atari 2600 and Atari 7800 consoles). As the popularity of the ST increased, it was given its own pull-out section called "Atari ST User". From the April 1987 issue onward, Atari ST User was spun off as a magazine in its own right and went on to outlive its parent by a number of years.

After the split, Atari User was almost entirely oriented towards the 8-bit computers. Until late 1987, when Page 6 magazine became available on newsstands, Atari User was the only British magazine with dedicated (or even significant) support for the 8-bit Atari line to be sold in shops.

Following publication of the final issue in November 1988, Database sold the 'Atari User' name (but not 'Atari ST User') to the publishers of Page 6 magazine, an independent rival. Page 6 was briefly renamed Page 6 Atari User, before settling on New Atari User. Despite the name, New Atari User was to all intents and purposes the same magazine as Page 6; it had virtually no editorial continuity with the old Atari User.

== See also ==
- Antic
- ANALOG Computing
