= Europress =

British magazine and software publisher

Europress was a British magazine and software publisher based in Adlington, near Macclesfield, Cheshire. Their magazine publishing business was previously known as Database Publications. The software division was renamed in 1999 to Actualize.

== History ==
Europress was formed by Derek Meakin in 1965. It began by publishing magazines and newspapers, then during the 1980s as an expansion of its magazine publishing business, it became involved in the rapidly growing software industry.

Under the name Database Software, they released software including the Red Arrows game for the ZX Spectrum and the office suite Mini Office II, as well as games and educational software for children.

During the late 1980s Europress decided to spin off its software publishing division as a separate company: Europress Software, with Christopher Payne as managing director and Diane O'Brien as Sales Director. Chris Payne came up with the name Mandarin Software as the brand for all the planned games, graphic designer Heather Sheldrick designed the logo, and Mandarin Software was launched to the press at a Chinese restaurant in London, where it showed off its first round of planned product launched. Europress Software published a high proportion of educational material, such as the Fun School series.

The publishing business was purchased by IDG and became IDG Media towards the end of 1994. A reorganization of the titles promptly followed, with the Atari, Amiga and Acorn divisions each losing one or more titles along the way.

In 1999, Hasbro Interactive purchased Europress. Following the closure of the deal, the studio prospered and expanded. It was able to produce titles using some of the brands owned by Hasbro, even producing two for Hasbro Germany.

Following Hasbro Interactive's purchase by the French-based Infogrames in January 2001, they gained little interest in Europress' focus on educational multimedia. On 13 July, Infogrames sold the Europress brand and titles to Trend Systems Limited, a company operated by the Meakin family, who effectively renamed Trend Systems as the new Europress Limited. The Europress business that Infogrames kept was renamed as Infogrames Learning Limited after the sale of the Europress brand.

After the Europress brand was returned to the Meakin family, they ran the company for a little over a year before it went into liquidation. A major factor in this was Granada TV's ignorance of their rights over Countdown. They had encouraged Europress to produce a Countdown CD-ROM, but only weeks before the launch, with large pre-orders, they discovered that they did not have the interactive rights.

In July 2002, the Europress brand was sold to Koch Media, who began licensing the brand to smaller companies wishing to create educational content. Koch than began to use the Europress brand as a publishing label for select titles.

Meakin then cofounded Meakin Enterprises with Chris Phillips. Meakin died in October 2010.

Past magazines that have since ceased publication include: Amiga Action, Amiga Computing, Acorn User, Acorn Computing, Computing with the Amstrad / Amstrad CPC Computing, Atari User, Atari ST User, ST Action, Mega Action, PC Today, PC Home, PC Action, Gamepro UK, Apple User, Telelink and Video Action.

== Europress Impact ==
When Europress bought Newsfield in 1991, Europress Impact, a satellite company of Europress, was launched. Run by ex-Newsfield directors Roger Kean, Oliver Frey and Jonathan Rignall. In 1993 the publishers name changed to Impact Magazines. Publications ceased in March 1994 as Impact entered into administration.

Key titles from Europress / Impact Magazines included:

- Zzap!64 - along with CRASH, Zzap!64 was one of the two main titles brought in from Newsfield. After issue 90 Zzap! was re-launched as Commodore Force, which lasted for 16 more issues ending with the last one in March 1994.
- CRASH - CRASH was Newsfield's first ever magazine title and the best seller at its peak. In 1992 the title was sold to EMAP after only five issues and was incorporated into their own Spectrum title Sinclair User.
- Sega Force - as with N Force, Sega Force was in its planning stage and ready to go ahead just when Newsfield collapsed. It covered the range of Sega consoles at the time. In July 1993 the magazine was split into Sega Force Mega, for the Mega Drive, and Sega Master Force, for the Master System and Game Gear. The titles disappeared as Impact Magazines closed.
- Mega Machines - Impact Magazines launched Mega Machines in the summer of 1993. Similar to the existing Sega Force Mega, the new title catered for the Sega Mega Drive and Sega CD, but was aimed at a younger audience and printed in landscape.
- N-Force - launched in July 1992, it is similar to sister title Sega Force but covered the Nintendo consoles NES, SNES and Game Boy. SNES coverage would transfer across to SNES Force, while N-Force maintained NES coverage until it was discontinued in August 1993.
- SNES Force - launched in July 1993, covering the SNES.
- Amiga Force - Amiga Force was launched towards the end of 1992, covering the Commodore Amiga computer games scene. It lasted for 16 issues before going down with its publishers.
