= List of Tiny Toon Adventures video games =

Since the creation of Tiny Toon Adventures, there have been a multitude of video games based on the series. During the 1990s, Konami held the license to develop and publish the Tiny Toon Adventures games. Other developers that have held the license include Atari, Terraglyph, Warthog, Lost Boy Games, and Treasure.

== List of games ==
The following is a complete list of the video games, the system it was released on, the year of release, and the developers and publishers.

| Title | System(s) | Release year | Developer | Publisher |
|---|---|---|---|---|
| Tiny Toon Adventures | Handheld | 1991 | Tiger Electronics | |
| Tiny Toon Adventures | NES | 1991 | Konami | Konami |
| Tiny Toon Adventures: Babs' Big Break | Game Boy | 1992 | Konami | Konami |
| Tiny Toon Adventures Cartoon Workshop | NES | 1992 | Novotrade | Konami |
| Tiny Toon Adventures 2: Trouble in Wackyland | NES | 1992 | Konami | Konami |
| Tiny Toon Adventures: Buster Busts Loose! | Super NES | 1992 | Konami | Konami |
| Tiny Toon Adventures: Buster's Hidden Treasure | Sega Genesis | 1993 | Konami | Konami |
| Tiny Toon Adventures 2: Montana's Movie Madness | Game Boy | 1993 | Konami | Konami |
| Tiny Toon Adventures: Wacky Sports Challenge | Game Boy Super NES | 1994 | Konami | |
| Tiny Toon Adventures: ACME All-Stars | Sega Genesis | 1994 | Konami | |
| Tiny Toon Adventures: Buster and the Beanstalk | Macintosh Microsoft Windows | 1996 | Terraglyph Interactive Studios | |
| Tiny Toon Adventures: Buster and the Beanstalk (PAL) Tiny Toon Adventures: The Great Beanstalk (NA) | PlayStation | 1998 | Terraglyph Interactive Studios | NewKidCo |
| Tiny Toon Adventures: Toonenstein - Dare to Scare! | PlayStation | 1999 | Terraglyph Interactive Studios | Vatical Entertainment |
| Tiny Toon Adventures: Buster Saves the Day | Game Boy Color | 2001 | Warthog | Conspiracy Games |
| Tiny Toon Adventures: Plucky's Big Adventure | PlayStation | 2001 | Warthog | Conspiracy Games |
| Tiny Toon Adventures: Dizzy's Candy Quest | Game Boy Color | 2001 (United Kingdom Only) | Formula | Conspiracy Games |
| Tiny Toon Adventures: Wacky Stackers | Game Boy Advance | 2001 | Warthog | Conspiracy Games |
| Tiny Toon Adventures: Buster's Bad Dream | Game Boy Advance | 2002 | Treasure | Conspiracy Games |

== Cancelled games ==
| Title | System(s) | Planned Release Year | Developer | Publisher |
|---|---|---|---|---|
| Tiny Toon Adventures | Atari Jaguar | Q1 1994 | Atari | |
| Tiny Toon Adventures: Defenders of the Universe | GameCube PlayStation 2 | Mid-2002 | Treasure | Conspiracy Games |
