= Tiny Toon Adventures: Babs' Big Break =

1992 video game

- North American cover art
- Developer: Konami
- Publisher: Konami
- Platform: Game Boy
- Release: JP: February 1, 1992; US: February 1992; UK: October 1992
- Genre: Platformer
- Mode: Single-player

Tiny Toon Adventures: Babs' Big Break (Note: Japanese: タイニー・トゥーン アドベンチャーズ, Hepburn: Tainī tūn adobenchāzu; lit. 'Tiny Toon Adventures') is a 1992 platformer video game for the Game Boy. It is based on the animated series Tiny Toon Adventures which had debuted in 1990. The game features the character Babs Bunny who sets out to Acme Theatre to become a big star. Unknown to Babs, Montana Max plans to demolish the theatre, which leads Buster Bunny, Plucky Duck and Hamton J. Pig to keep after her and make sure she does not get into any trouble.

The game was developed and published by Konami, and was one of the many games the company had based on the series. On its release, it received reviews that complimented its graphics. A number of reviews found the game too slow paced or that it may have been a bit too easy.

== Background and plot ==
Tiny Toon Adventures: Babs' Big Break is based on the animated television series Tiny Toon Adventures which debuted in September 1990. The series features teenage characters of similar species of animals and humans from the Warner Bros. Cartoons. The show features teenage characters such as Buster Bunny, Babs Bunny and the humans Elmyra and Montana Max who attend Acme Looniversity where they have characters like Bugs Bunny and Daffy Duck as mentors.

In the game, Babs Bunny dreams of being a big star and plans to head to Acme Theatre to enhance her acting. Unknown to Babs, Montana Max has plans to tear down the theatre and replace it with his own private vault. This leads Buster Bunny, Plucky Duck and Hamton J. Pig to try and warn Babs before it is too late.

== Gameplay ==
Babs' Big Break is a platformer game. It contains four levels: Sure Weird Forest, Acme Looniversity, Pipsqueak Pipe Maze, and Groovy Train. Controlling either Buster, Plucky or Hamton, players can defeat enemies by either jumping on them or throwing vegetables at them. Characters can be changed via a selection screen. Each character throw different fruits and vegetables with different gameplay mechanics: Buster throws carrots in an arc, Plucky tosses pineapples that bounce off the ground, and Hamton rolls watermelons at enemies.

Power-ups can be found by jumping on small "bonus blocks" that can earn the player items that enhance weaponry, grant invincibility, or hearts which offer health restoration.

The game includes mini-games that are located within levels such as a race against other Tiny Toon characters and a whack-a-mole-styled game. Characters beaten in these mini-games allow the player to progress through the levels.

== Development ==
Bill Kunkel wrote in Electronic Games that by 1993 cartoon and comic book characters had become "red hot license properties" with developers taken advantage of 16-bit graphics and multimedia technology which led to various companies signing up to license their characters into video games from Disney, Hanna-Barbera and Warner Brothers along with then newer programs such as The Simpsons, Ren & Stimpy and Batman: The Animated Series.

An anonymous writer in Nintendo Power commented in 1997 that Konami had "went all out" with its license on Warner Bros. animated series Tiny Toon Adventures. These included video games across several consoles, such as such as Tiny Toon Adventures 2: Trouble in Wackyland (1992), Tiny Toon Adventures: Buster Busts Loose! (1992) and Tiny Toon Adventures: Buster's Hidden Treasure (1993). The surge of these video games based on cartoon and comic characters also extended in the handheld video game market with Konami making two Tiny Toons games for the Game Boy: Tiny Toon Adventures: Babs' Big Break (1992) and Tiny Toon Adventures 2: Montana's Movie Madness (1993).

The game was developed and published by Konami. The Japanese version of the game features small differences such having the characters have three energy hearts instead of two and adds a password system.

== Release and reception ==
Reception

Review scores
Publication	Score
Electronic Gaming Monthly	7/10, 8/10, 8/10, 8/10
Famitsu	7/10, 5/10, 5/10, 5/10
Games-X	4.5/5
Joystick	93%
Total!	89%
VideoGames & Computer Entertainment	8/10
Nintendo Magazine System	89%
Video Games	81%

Tiny Toon Adventures: Babs' Big Break was released for the Game Boy in Japan on February 1, 1992 and in the United States in the same month. It was released in the United Kingdom in October 1992. It was re-released in 1997. In 2025, a fan made patch was made for the game that added color to the game for the Game Boy Color as well as other visual changes.

Chris Bieniek of VideoGames & Computer Entertainment described the game as a "pleasant surprise", while Steve Jarratt of Total! added that as platform games were overtly common and licensed games based on television tv shows are generally considered poor, Babs' Big Break was an exception. Bieniek, Jarratt and reviewers in Electronic Gaming Monthly, Joystick, and Games-X magazines described the graphics as a highlight of the game, with the latter publication saying it was "visually one of the best games I've ever seen on the Game Boy"

Hammura Tsūshin of Famitsu found the game's presentation and animation awesome, but that the gameplay was ordinary. Other reviewers in the magazine said the game was well made but the pacing is poor and that while the action was slow-paced, seasoned players would find its tempo unbearable. Reviews from Bieniek and in Games-X said the game may have been a little too easy. A review in Electronic Gaming Monthly suggested that also found that gameplay was slow, but was balanced out by not to have the blurring effect that Game Boy games tended to have.

Nintendo Power magazine included the game in their year-end best-of list top Game Boy games of 1992. They complimented the games "well-rendered graphics" and how they captured the spirit of the original cartoon.

== See also ==
- List of Game Boy games
- List of Konami games
