= Tiny Toon Adventures: Buster Saves the Day =

2001 video game

- Developer: Warthog
- Publishers: NA: Conspiracy Games; EU: Swing! Entertainment
- Platform: Game Boy Color
- Release: EU: June 29, 2001; NA: July 27, 2001
- Genre: Platformer
- Mode: Single-player

Tiny Toon Adventures: Buster Saves the Day is the first Tiny Toon Adventures game released on the Nintendo Game Boy Color. It was released on June 29, 2001 in Europe and July 27, 2001 in United States and was developed by Warthog and published by Conspiracy Games in North America and Swing! Entertainment in Europe.

== Gameplay ==
Buster Saves the Day is a side-scrolling platformer where the player controls Buster Bunny as he puts a stop to the evil plans of Montana Max, who has kidnapped Buster's friends. Various characters from the Tiny Toon Adventures cartoon makes an appearance and some of them attempt to stop Buster from saving his friends. Babs Bunny, Plucky Duck, and Hamton J. Pig are among those that Max has kidnapped.

Various weapons are a part of Buster's arsenal, including magic balls that differ in physics and speed.

== See More ==
Next Game: Tiny Toon Adventures: Wacky Stackers
