= Billy West =

American voice actor (born 1952)

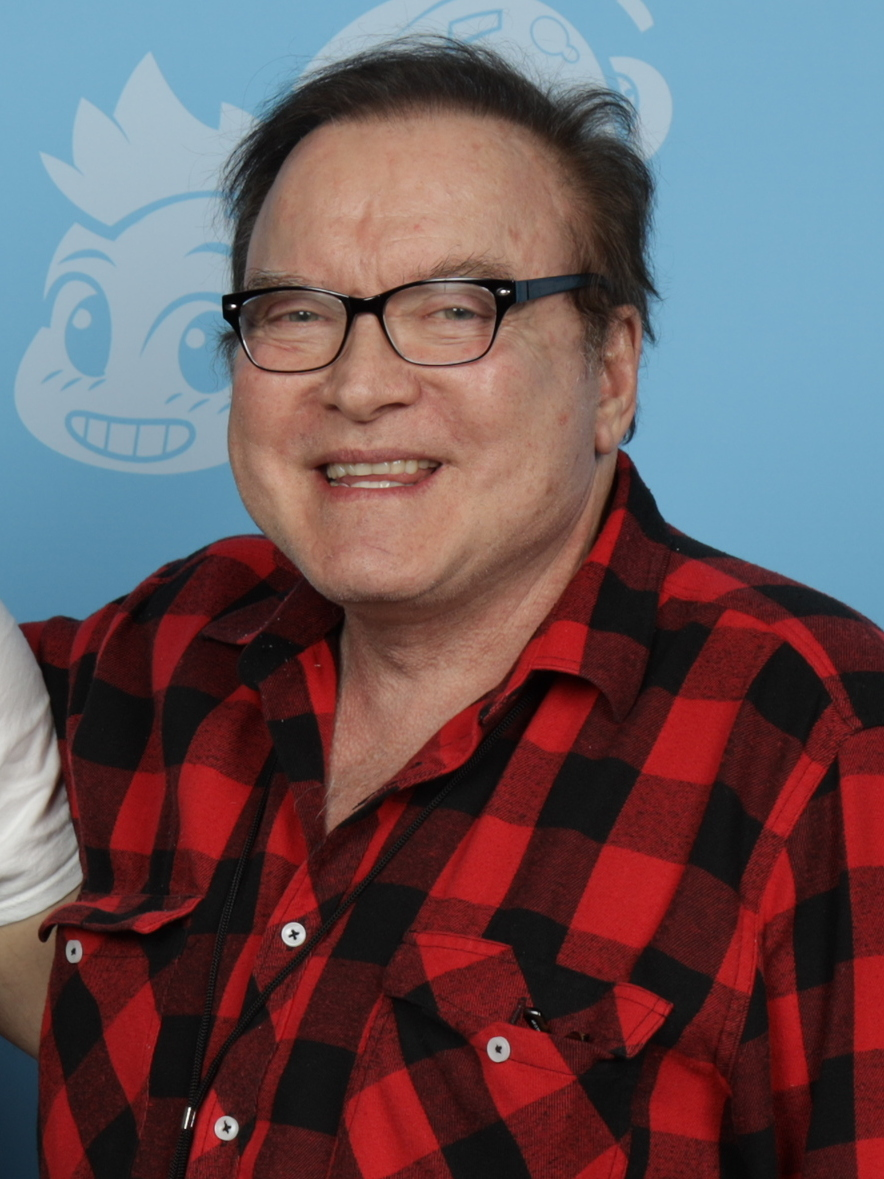
- West at Animate! Columbus in 2023
- Born: William Richard Werstine; April 1952 (age 74); Detroit, Michigan, U.S.
- Occupations: Voice actor; musician
- Years active: 1980–present
- Spouse: Violet Benny (m. 1992; div. 2009)
- Website: billywest.com

William Richard Werstine (born April 1952) known professionally as Billy West, is an American voice actor and musician. His voice roles include Bugs Bunny in the 1996 film Space Jam, the title characters of Doug and The Ren & Stimpy Show, and several subsequent projects. He also voiced Disney characters, including Ellyvan the Elephant in Jungle Junction, Bashful in The 7D, as well as the Futurama characters Philip J. Fry, Professor Farnsworth, Dr. Zoidberg, Zapp Brannigan, and many more. In commercials, he voices the Red M&M and formerly voiced Buzz for Honey Nut Cheerios. West also voices other established characters such as Elmer Fudd, Popeye, Shaggy Rogers, Rocket Raccoon, Muttley, and Woody Woodpecker. West was a regular performer on WBCN 104.1 FM in Boston, Massachusetts during the mid-to-late 1980s, primarily appearing on Charles Laquidara's "The Big Mattress" morning show. He worked at the station until approximately 1988, when he moved to New York City to work at K-Rock (WXRK) and eventually joined The Howard Stern Show. He was a cast member on The Howard Stern Show, during which time he was noted for his impressions of Larry Fine, Marge Schott, George Takei, and Jackie Martling.

== Early life ==
William Richard Werstine was born in Detroit, Michigan, in April 1952. He is of Irish descent, and was born with ADHD and autism. His family moved to the Herman Gardens projects when he was an infant. West described his father as physically abusive to him and his mother and stated he developed his impressionist abilities as a coping mechanism. He was also sexually abused as a child. As a child, he injured himself going down a slide and had endured pain in his neck for over 35 years. As a child, West was inspired by Sid Caesar, who had hosted Your Show of Shows and cited Imogene Coca, Nanette Fabray and Danny Kaye as major influences. In 1963, he and his family moved to Boston, and settled in Roslindale.He graduated from Roslindale High School. After a semester at Berklee College of Music, West found himself in various bands, gigging the Boston scene by night, and selling guitars in a Harvard Square shop during the day.

West has stated that during the Vietnam War, he was subject to the draft lottery under the Nixon administration, receiving a low draft number which would have resulted in his conscription in 1970. West was ultimately classified "4-F" and excluded from enlistment on medical grounds as he had hypertension and flat feet. West described his later recurring role as Richard Nixon on Futurama as his "revenge" against Nixon. In a 2019 video post, West opined that the "biggest joke" about his experience was the Richard Nixon Presidential Library and Museum subsequently including images and footage of the Futurama Nixon character as part of its "Nixon in Popular Culture" exhibit.

== Career ==
=== Radio career ===
In 1980, West was part of an oldies band called The Shutdowns. West worked at WBCN in Boston, performing daily comedic routines on The Big Mattress show, then moved to New York City in 1988, working at K-Rock Radio (92.3 FM WXRK). West became a regular on The Howard Stern Show at that time until leaving in 1995, where he gained notice for his impersonations of Three Stooges middleman Larry Fine, Cincinnati Reds owner Marge Schott and Stern's head writer Jackie Martling. West moved to Los Angeles, where he found success as a voice actor and performer.

=== Television ===
He left the radio station in 1988 to work on the short-lived revival of Beany and Cecil, which was his first voice role in television. West's first major roles were on Doug and The Ren & Stimpy Show, which were two of the first three Nicktoons on Nickelodeon (the other being Rugrats). Over his career, West has been the voice talent for close to 120 different characters including some of the most iconic animated figures in television history. He has become one of the few voice actors who can impersonate Mel Blanc in his prime, including characterizations of Bugs Bunny and Daffy Duck, the voice Arthur Q. Bryan used for Elmer Fudd, as well as other characters from Warner Bros. cartoons. In 1998, Entertainment Weekly described West as "the new Mel Blanc" and noted his ability to mimic well-known voices, though he would rather develop original voices. West's favorite characters are Philip J. Fry and Stimpy, both of which he originated. West has been very outspoken over his displeasure about the influx of star actors providing voice-over for films and major shows. West has stated that he did not like the Disney version of Doug and that he "couldn't watch" the show. West was the voice of the show's namesake, Geeker, throughout Project Geeker's 13-episode run. West was the voice of Zim in the original pilot for Invader Zim. However, according to creator Jhonen Vasquez, he was replaced by Richard Steven Horvitz due to his voice being too recognizable. West was the voice of "Red" in numerous M&M commercials, as well as the 3D film I Lost My M in Vegas, currently playing at M&M's World in Las Vegas, Nevada. He also voices a number of minor characters in the series Rick & Steve: The Happiest Gay Couple in All the World. He voiced the character Moobeard in Moobeard the Cow Pirate, a short animation featured on Random! Cartoons and reprises his role as Elmer Fudd in Cartoon Network's series The Looney Tunes Show. In 1999, he also had a cameo in the Emmy Award-winning cartoon Dilbert.

==== The Ren & Stimpy Show ====
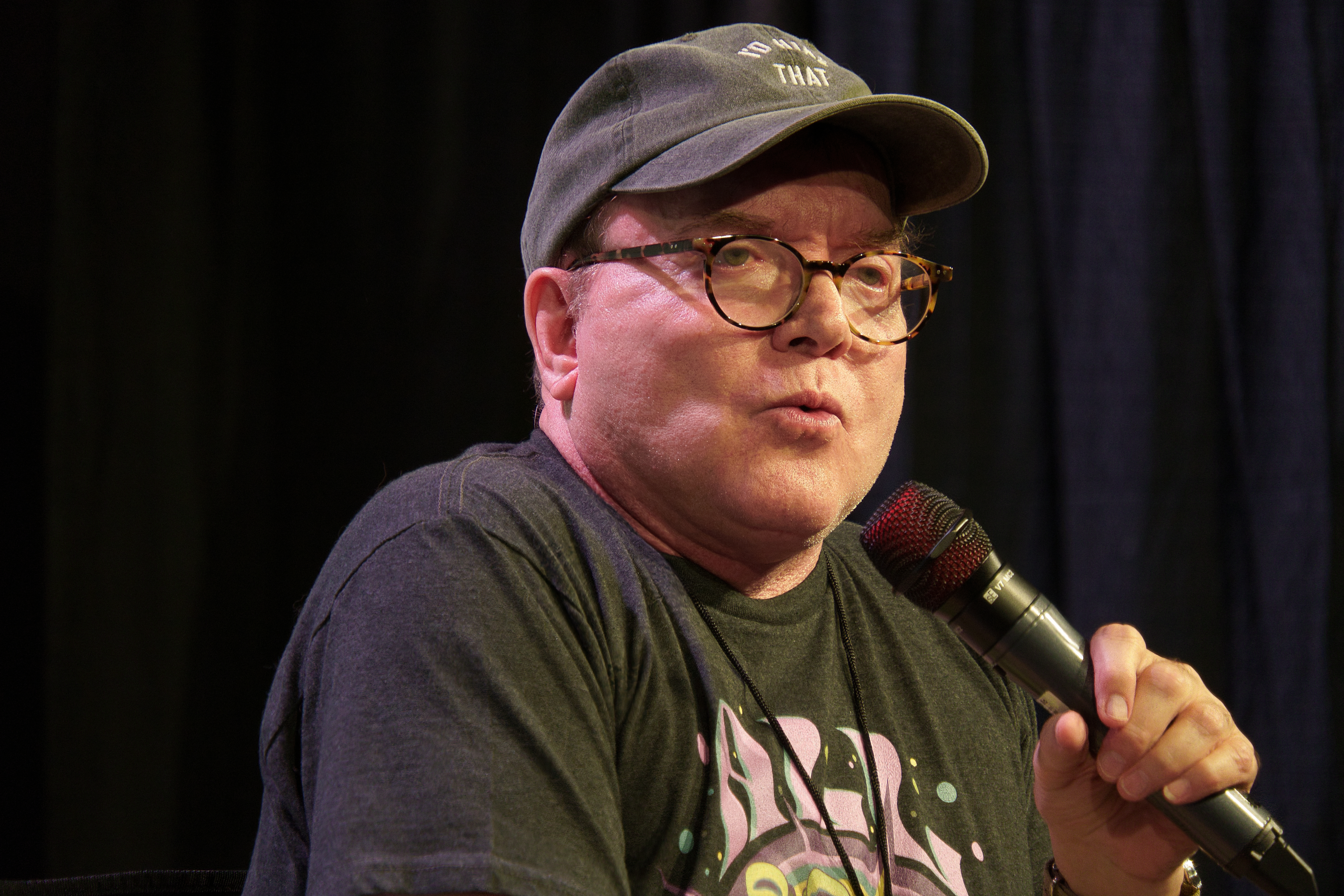
Billy West at the Q&A Galaxy Con Raleigh 2023

West provided the voice of Stimpson J. Cat in Nickelodeon's The Ren & Stimpy Show from 1991 until 1996, and he later provided the voice of Ren Höek from 1993 to 1996 when Ren's original voice and series creator John Kricfalusi was fired by Nickelodeon (then a division of the original Viacom) for delivering late and objectionable episodes. He performed other characters on the series, such as Mr. Horse (another role he took over after Kricfalusi's departure) and the announcer for the "Log" ads (a voice West would use years later as the narrator for The Weird Al Show).

According to West, he was originally supposed to do the voice of both Ren and Stimpy (and performed both characters on the tape that was used to sell the show to Nickelodeon), but then Kricfalusi decided to do the voice of Ren himself once the show was sold and he had West on board as part of the selling point. However, West provided Ren's laughter with Kricfalusi as Ren's speaking voice.

==== Other Of Ren & Stimpy ====
In 2003, a reboot of Ren & Stimpy helmed by Kricfalusi, titled Ren & Stimpy "Adult Party Cartoon", was launched on a late night programming block on Spike TV and was rated TV-MA. West on the other hand refused to participate in as he believed it was not funny and felt that it would've damaged his career if he had voiced Stimpy in it. West was replaced by Eric Bauza in the series following this.

==== Futurama ====
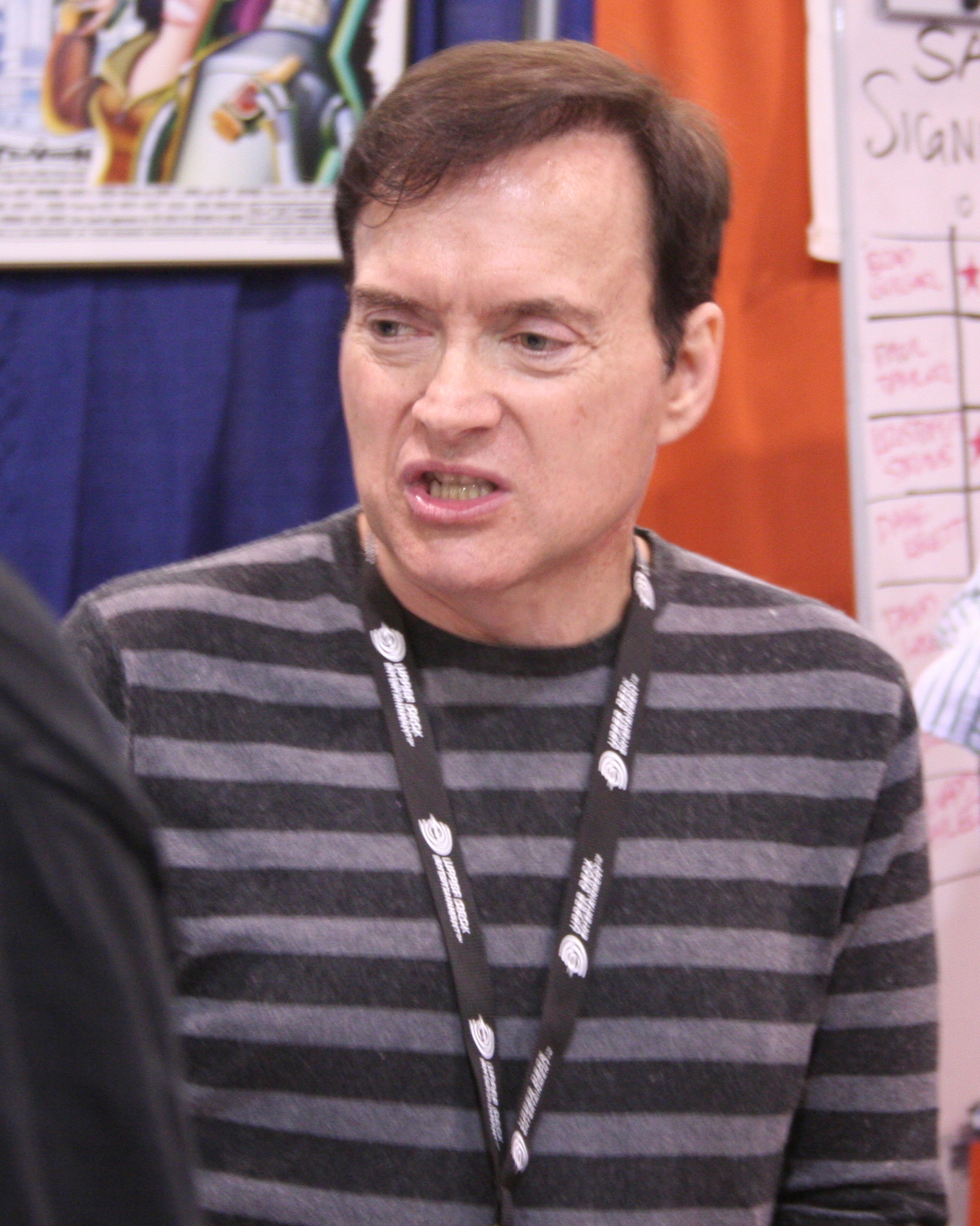
West in 2006

West's roles in Futurama include Philip J. Fry, Professor Farnsworth, Zapp Brannigan, and Dr. Zoidberg, among others. As he and other Futurama cast and crew point out in DVD commentaries, he voiced so many characters throughout the series that conversations are often held entirely between characters he is voicing. West went into the Futurama auditions and was asked to try out for, as he says, "just about every part". He eventually landed the roles of Farnsworth, Zoidberg, and Brannigan. He later got the main role of Fry, which originally had gone to Charlie Schlatter. While West is known for his original voices, the voice he uses for Fry is often considered to be closer to his natural voice than any other character he has played; in an audio commentary, he states Fry is "just [himself] at age 25". This similarity, West acknowledges, was done purposefully in order to make it harder to replace him in the part along with placing more of himself personally into the role.

The role of Zapp Brannigan was written for the late Phil Hartman, who died before the show started; West was given the role. West has described his interpretation of Zapp Brannigan's voice as an imitation of Hartman, but described the actual vocalizations of the character as being based on "a couple of big dumb announcers I knew." Futurama was renewed by Comedy Central as four direct-to-DVD films broken into 16 television episodes. West reprised his roles for these films and was signed on for two new 26-episode production seasons (four 13-episode air seasons) of Futurama which aired summers of 2010 to 2013.

In 2022, it was announced that Futurama would be returning in 2023 with the original cast, including West.

==== Advertising ====
West was the announcer of the program Screen Gems Network which ran from 1999 to 2001. He was the promotional announcer for The Comedy Channel before it merged with HA! to become Comedy Central. Over his career, Billy West has voiced multiple characters in television commercials. These include (but are not limited to):

- Red, the plain milk chocolate M&M (1996–present) (after Jon Lovitz's departure from the role in 1996)
- Buzz, the bee for Honey Nut Cheerios (1990–2004)
- An alien for Pentium 4
- Popeye for Minute Maid
- Babe Ruth, Mickey Goldmill and Bruce Lee for Brisk Iced Tea
- Marfalump, a mascot for Pepsi from 1999 to 2000; created to tie in with the release of Star Wars: Episode I – The Phantom Menace

West voiced the Speed Racer character in a late 1990s advertisement for Volkswagen, because the commercial's producers could not locate Peter Fernandez, the original voice of Speed. However, the producers did locate Corinne Orr, the original voice for the characters Trixie and Spritle.

=== Online ===
West voiced Graham and Julius F. in Eric Kaplan's web cartoon Zombie College and two characters in Tofu the Vegan Zombie. He appeared on Ken Reid's TV Guidance Counselor Podcast on January 30, 2015. The episode was recorded live at The Smell in Downtown Los Angeles during the third annual Riot LA Comedy Festival.

West began his own podcast show in July 2015. It features him doing numerous characters per episode, recurring segments such as "Song Demolition", "Billy Bastard – Amateur Human Being" and special guest Jim Gomez.

=== Films ===
In the 1996 film Space Jam, West voiced Bugs Bunny and Elmer Fudd. He reprised both roles in subsequent Looney Tunes feature-length films and returned as Fudd in the theatrically released Looney Tunes: Back in Action. In 1998, West starred in the direct-to-video film Scooby-Doo on Zombie Island as Shaggy Rogers, becoming the second person to portray the character (the first being Casey Kasem). He was one of the top contenders to replace Kasem after his retirement in 2009 but lost the role to Matthew Lillard. He voiced the role of Muttley in the 2020 Scooby-Doo CGI film Scoob!. In 2000, he provided additional voices in Disney's Dinosaur. In 2004, West voiced the classic character Popeye in the 75th-anniversary film Popeye's Voyage: The Quest for Pappy, and made his live-action film debut in Mark Hamill's Comic Book: The Movie. He also appeared in a cameo in Garfield: The Movie. Other films featuring West's vocal talents include Joe's Apartment, Cats & Dogs, Olive, the Other Reindeer, TMNT, The Proud Family Movie and as Biff Buzzard in two Tom and Jerry direct-to-video films.

=== Music ===
West is a guitarist and singer-songwriter with a band called Billy West and the Grief Counselors. They have released their debut studio album, Me-Pod. West has toured as a guitarist for Roy Orbison and Brian Wilson.

In 1982, West sang lead, doing an impersonation of Mike Love, on a Beach Boys-inspired tune, "Another Cape Cod Summer This Year", by studio band ROUTE 28, written and produced by Erik Lindgren on his Arf! Arf! Records label.

West has collaborated with Deborah Harry, Lou Reed, and Los Lobos, and he has played live on several occasions with Brian Wilson, including the guitar solo on the Beach Boys tune "Do It Again" on Late Show with David Letterman, in the mid-1990s.

The Futurama episode "Proposition Infinity" features the track "Shut Up and Love Me" which was written and played by Billy West and Greg Leon, under the name Wailing Fungus.

=== Radio ===
Throughout the 1980s, West provided character voices on Charles Laquidara's Big Mattress radio show on Boston's WBCN. West was one-half of the award-winning WBCN Production team from 1980 to 1986. From 1989 through 1995, West provided The Howard Stern Show with character voices such as Jim Backus, Lucille Ball, Raymond Burr, Johnny Carson, Johnnie Cochran, Connie Chung, Pat Cooper, Jane Curtin, Sammy Davis Jr., Doris Day, Louis "Red" Deutsch, David Dinkins, Mia Farrow, Larry Fine, Pete Fornatale, Frank Gifford, Kathie Lee Gifford, Rudy Giuliani, Mark Goddard, Bobcat Goldthwait, Doug Tracht, Jonathan Harris (as Dr. Zachary Smith), Leona Helmsley, Evander Holyfield, Shemp Howard, Lance Ito, Elton John, Don Knotts, Jay Leno, Nelson Mandela, Jackie Martling (as the Jackie puppet), Ed McMahon, Al Michaels, Bill Mumy (as Will Robinson), Cardinal John O'Connor, Maury Povich, Soon-Yi Previn, Marge Schott, Frank Sinatra, Rae Stern (Howard Stern's mother), George Takei, Joe Walsh and Robin Williams until eventually leaving the show over money. West was an occasional contributor to The Adam Carolla Show, a syndicated morning radio show that replaced Stern's show on CBS in LA. On February 19 and 20, 2007, The Howard Stern Show ran a special two-part retrospective of West's work with the show. It marked his first work with the show since leaving after his last show on November 1, 1995. On June 9, 2009, West appeared on Jackie Martling's Jackie's Joke Hunt on Stern's satellite radio channel Howard 101.

=== Book ===
In 2026, West release a memoir called Voice-A-Versa: How I Found My Voice, publsihed by Abrams Books.

=== Video games ===
Characters voiced by West include Bugs Bunny and Elmer Fudd in numerous Looney Tunes video games.

Other video game characters West has voiced include:

- Stimpy in The Ren & Stimpy Show: Veediots! (1993), Nicktoons Racing (2000), and Nicktoons: Attack of the Toybots (2007)
- Dr. Zoidberg in The Simpsons Game (2007)
- Additional voices in Spyro: Enter the Dragonfly (2002)
- Ricky Sr. and O'Toole in Open Season (2006)
- Sparx in The Legend of Spyro: The Eternal Night (2007)
- Philip J. Fry, Professor Farnsworth, Dr. Zoidberg and Zapp Brannigan in Futurama (2003)
- Nash and Zam in Crash Nitro Kart (2003)
- Voices for the player character in Baldur's Gate II: Shadows of Amn (2000)
- Murfy and other characters in Rayman 3: Hoodlum Havoc (2003)
- Muttley and L'il Gruesome in Wacky Races: Starring Dastardly and Muttley (2001)
- Red in M&M's: The Lost Formulas (2000)
- Hamton J. Pig in Tiny Toon Adventures: Toonenstein (1999)
- Atomic Bomberman in Atomic Bomberman (1997)
- Emilio Baza in Gabriel Knight 3: Blood of the Sacred, Blood of the Damned (1999)
- Bugs Bunny and Elmer Fudd in Bugs Bunny: Lost in Time (1999), and Bugs Bunny & Taz: Time Busters (2000)
- The Yak in Nicktoons MLB (2011)
- Fire Kraken, Freeze Blade, Food Fight, Chill Bill and Rocky Roll in Skylanders: Swap Force (2013), Skylanders: Trap Team (2014) and Skylanders: SuperChargers (2015)
- The narrator in Minecraft: Story Mode (2015)
- Ren and Stimpy in Nickelodeon All-Star Brawl (2021; voice added as part of the June 6, 2022 update)
- Murfy in Rayman Legends Retold (2026)

== Personal life ==
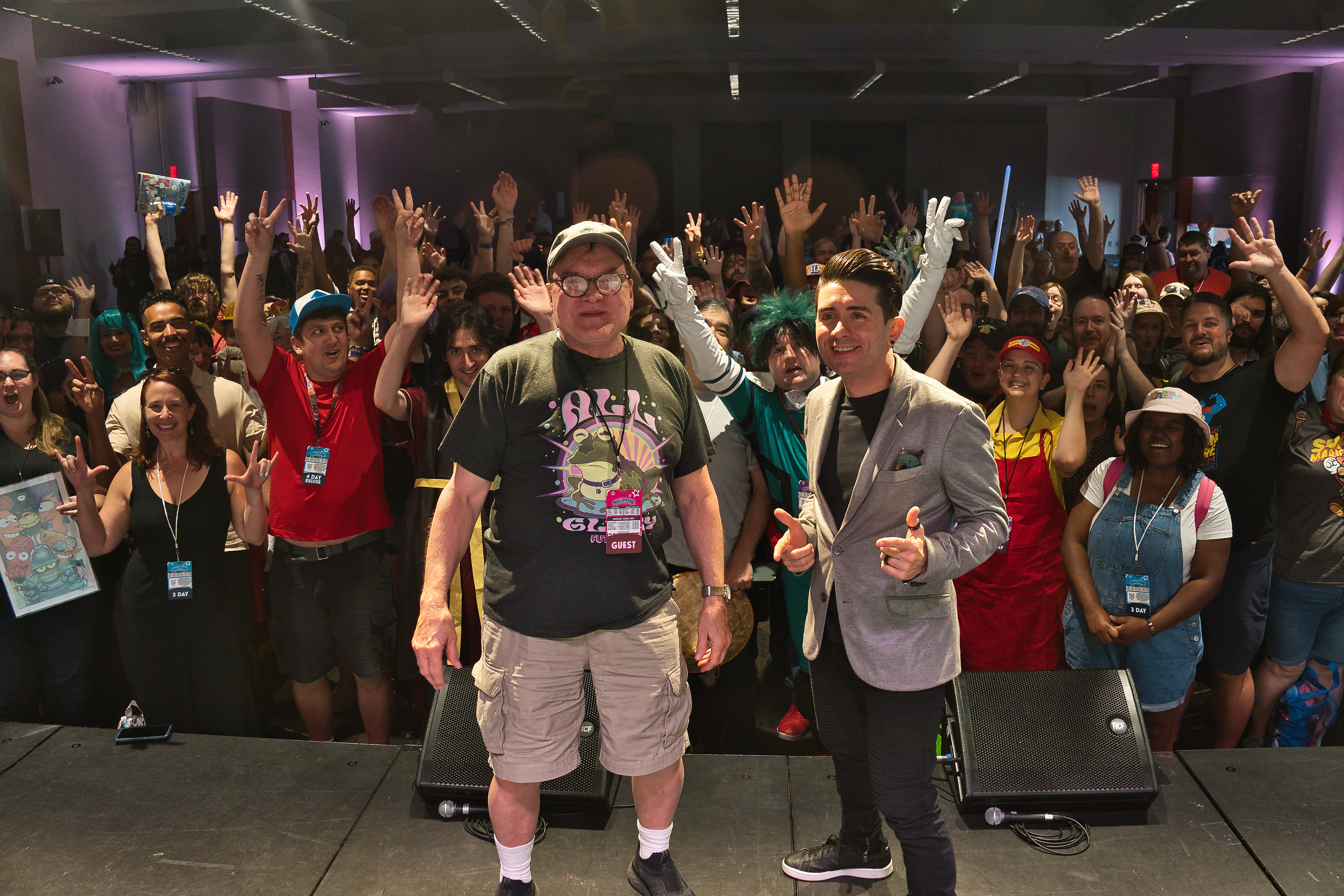
West interacting with fans at GalaxyCon Raleigh, 2023

West was married to Violet Benny; the couple later divorced.

West has expressed criticism of Dick Cheney and the Republican Party, describing Republican senators as "old men with bad breath and dandruff". He has also parodied the Twitter posts of Donald Trump by reading them in the voice of Futurama character Zapp Brannigan, drawing comedic parallels between Trump and the fictional character.

In 1998, West purchased a home in the Hollywood Hills West area of Los Angeles for $480,000 and sold it for $1.18 million in March 2016.

West is a prostate cancer survivor. He has also discussed experiencing episodes of depression.

In 2019, West revealed on Gilbert Gottfried's Amazing Colossal Podcast that he had been diagnosed as being on the autism spectrum.

== Filmography ==
=== Film ===
List of voice performances in feature and direct-to-video films
Year	Title	Role	Notes
1996	Joe's Apartment	Ralph Roach	
1996	Space Jam	Bugs Bunny, Elmer Fudd	Role of Elmer shared with an uncredited Greg Burson
1998	Scooby-Doo on Zombie Island	Norville "Shaggy" Rogers	Direct-to-video
2000	Dinosaur	Additional voices	
2000	Rugrats in Paris: The Movie	Sumo Singers	
2001	Cats & Dogs	Ninja Cat	
2001	Osmosis Jones	Collin	Uncredited
2001	Jimmy Neutron: Boy Genius	Butch Pakovski, Various Voices	
2002	Tom and Jerry: The Magic Ring	Freddie	Direct-to-video
2003	Looney Tunes: Back in Action	Elmer Fudd, Peter Lorre	
2004	Garfield	Dog	
2004	Popeye's Voyage: The Quest for Pappy	Popeye, Pappy	Direct-to-video
2005	Tom and Jerry: Blast Off to Mars	Biff Buzzard, King Thingg, Gardener #2	Direct-to-video
2005	Tom and Jerry: The Fast and the Furry	Biff Buzzard, Hollywood President, Squirty	Direct-to-video
2006	Curious George	Manager	
2006	Queer Duck: The Movie	Bi-Polar Bear	Direct-to-video
2006	Bah, Humduck! A Looney Tunes Christmas	Bugs Bunny, Elmer Fudd	Direct-to-video
2006	Casper's Scare School	Fatso, Figurehead	
2007	TMNT	Newscaster	
2007	Billy & Mandy's Big Boogey Adventure	Pirate #8, Miniature Cyclops, Spider Clown Mailman, Beast Master	
2007	Futurama: Bender's Big Score	Philip J. Fry, Lars Fillmore, Professor Farnsworth, Dr. Zoidberg, Zapp Brannigan, Richard Nixon, additional voices	Direct-to-video
2008	Futurama: The Beast with a Billion Backs	Philip J. Fry, Professor Farnsworth, Dr. Zoidberg, Zapp Brannigan, Richard Nixon, additional voices	Direct-to-video
2008	Futurama: Bender's Game	Philip J. Fry, Professor Farnsworth, Dr. Zoidberg, additional voices	Direct-to-video
2009	Futurama: Into the Wild Green Yonder	Philip J. Fry, Professor Farnsworth, Dr. Zoidberg, Zapp Brannigan, Leo Wong, Richard Nixon, additional voices	Direct-to-video
2012	Daffy's Rhapsody	Elmer Fudd	Short film
2013	Scooby-Doo! Mask of the Blue Falcon	Becker	Direct-to-video
2015	The SpongeBob Movie: Sponge Out of Water	Seagull	
2015	Looney Tunes: Rabbits Run	Elmer Fudd	Direct-to-video
2015	Pixels	Additional voices	
2017	Best Fiends: Boot Camp	General Slug	Short film
2020	Scoob!	Muttley	

=== Television ===
List of voice performances in television shows
Year	Title	Role	Notes
1988	The New Adventures of Beany and Cecil	Cecil	
1991–1994	Doug	Doug Funnie, Roger Klotz, additional voices	
1991–1996	The Ren & Stimpy Show	Stimpson J. Cat, Ren Höek (1992–1996)*, additional voices	*Replacing John Kricfalusi
1994	The Baby Huey Show	Fox	
1995	The Shnookums & Meat Funny Cartoon Show	France Bug	
1996	Earthworm Jim	Morty	Episode: "Lounge Day's Journey Into Night"
1996	Project G.e.e.K.e.R.	GeeKeR	
1996–1999	Timon & Pumbaa	Additional voices	
1997–1998	The Sylvester & Tweety Mysteries	Various characters	5 episodes
1997–1998	Pinky and the Brain	Various characters	
1997–1998	Space Goofs	Additional voices	
1997–2000	I Am Weasel	Additional voices	
1997–2004	Johnny Bravo	Various voices	5 episodes
1997	Cow and Chicken	Bag Boy	Episode: "My Friend, the Smart Banana"
1997	The Weird Al Show	Show Announcer, Harvey the Wonder Hamster	
1997	Extreme Ghostbusters	Slimer, Mayor McShane	
1997	Aaahh!!! Real Monsters	Lombar, Construction Worker	Episode: "Laugh, Krumm, Laugh"
1997–1999	King of the Hill	Cigarenders Leader, Mr. Holloway, Sergeant Barber	
1998	Mad Jack the Pirate	Snuk	
1998	Animaniacs	Codger Eggbert	Episode: "Hooray for North Hollywood, Pt. 2"
1998	The New Batman Adventures	Mo, Lar, Cur	Episode: "Beware the Creeper"
1998	Oh Yeah! Cartoons	Various characters	
1998–2000	Histeria!	Chit Chatterson, Bugs Bunny, Elmer Fudd, Daffy Duck, Porky Pig, Foghorn Leghorn, various voices	
1998–2000	Voltron: The Third Dimension	Pidge, various voices	
1998–2005	The Powerpuff Girls	Additional voices	
1998–2005	CatDog	Rancid Rabbit, Mr. Sunshine, Randolph Grant, Mean Bob, additional voices	
1999	Queer Duck	Bi-Polar Bear, additional voices	
1999	Superman: The Animated Series	Lexie #2	Episode: "A Fish Story"
1999	Detention	Emmitt Roswell	
1999	Olive, the Other Reindeer	Mr. Eskimo	Television film
1999	Dilbert	Marketing Guy, additional voices	
1999–2000	Rayman: The Animated Series	Rayman, Grub	
1999–present	Futurama	Philip J. Fry, Professor Farnsworth, Dr. Zoidberg, Zapp Brannigan, Richard Nixon, additional voices	
1999–2002	Screen Gems Network	Announcer	Syndicated program
1999–2002	The New Woody Woodpecker Show	Woody Woodpecker, Wally Walrus, Smedley, various voices	
1999, 2002	Hey Arnold!	Various voices	2 episodes
2000–2002	Poochini	Poochini, Walter White, Mr. Garvey, Lockjaw	
2000	Buzz Lightyear of Star Command	Voice	Episode: "Lost in Time"
2000	Harvey Birdman, Attorney at Law	Dr. Zin	Episode: "Bannon Custody Case"
2000–2001	Zombie College	Julius, Graham	
2000–2001	Horrible Histories	Stitch, Narrator, additional voices	
2001	The Oblongs	George Klimer, Anita Bidet, additional voices	
2001	Lloyd in Space	Larvel	Episode: "Nerd from Beyond the Stars"
2001	Totally Spies!	Lester Crawley	Episode: "The Eraser"
2002–2006	My Life as a Teenage Robot	Principal Razinski, additional voices	
2002	Jackie Chan Adventures	Monkey King	Episode: "Monkey a Go-Go"
2002	Crank Yankers	Confucious, Moo Shu	
2002	Ozzy & Drix	Muscle Cell	Episode: "Reflex"
2002, 2017	Samurai Jack	Various characters	2 episodes
2002–2006	The Adventures of Jimmy Neutron: Boy Genius	Sam Melvick, Corky Shimatzu, additional voices	
2003	Duck Dodgers	Mother Fudd, Zeke	
2003	As Told by Ginger	Cleetis Boregard, Mrs. Grimley	2 episodes
2003	Teamo Supremo	Barney the Bungler	Episode: "Beware of the Bungler!"
2004	What's New, Scooby-Doo?	Jimmy Proudwolf	Episode: "New Mexico, Old Monster"
2004	Invader Zim	Zim	Episode: "Pilot"
2004	Justice League Unlimited	Skeets	Episode: "The Greatest Story Never Told"
2004, 2006	Codename: Kids Next Door	Numbuh 13	
2005	The Life and Times of Juniper Lee	Leprechaun	Episode: " It's Your Party and I'll Whine If I Want To"
2005	The Proud Family Movie	Board Member, Cab Driver	Television film
2006–2007	Drawn Together	Stimpy, Popeye, Denzel Washington	
2006–2007	Squirrel Boy	Kyle Finster	
2006–2007	Loonatics Unleashed	Sagittarius Stomper, Male Reporter (1), Electro J. Fudd	2 episodes
2006	The Jimmy Timmy Power Hour	Sam Melvick, Corky Shimatzu, Blix, British Official	Television film
2006	Catscratch	Bear Captain, Bear Guard	Episode: "The Secret Door"
2006	Ben 10	Kraab, Punk, Guard	2 episodes
2007	Chowder	Additional voices	
2007	El Tigre: The Adventures of Manny Rivera	Additional voices	
2007–2009	Rick & Steve: The Happiest Gay Couple in All the World	Various voices	
2007–2009	Back at the Barnyard	Various voices	
2008	The Marvelous Misadventures of Flapjack	Additional voices	
2008	The Mighty B!	Additional voices	
2008	Random! Cartoons	MooBeard, Value Guy, Finster, Johnny Space Guy, Space Pilot, Space Thugs	
2009–2010	Batman: The Brave and the Bold	Skeets	5 episodes
2009–2012	Jungle Junction	Ellyvan	
2010	Kick Buttowski: Suburban Daredevil	Additional voices	
2010	T.U.F.F. Puppy	Additional voices	
2010	Glenn Martin, DDS	Mr. Vernon	Episode: "Camp"
2010, 2012	Scooby-Doo! Mystery Incorporated	Gunther Gator, Randy Warsaw, Butch Firbanks	
2011	Mongo Wrestling Alliance	Various	
2011	Eric Kaplan's Sketch World	Additional voices	Web series
2011–2014	The Looney Tunes Show	Elmer Fudd, Waiter	
2012	The High Fructose Adventures of Annoying Orange	Cranberry	
2013	Ultimate Spider-Man	Rocket Raccoon	Episode: "Guardians of the Galaxy"
2014	The Simpsons	Philip J. Fry, Professor Farnsworth, Dr. Zoidberg	Episode: "Simpsorama"
2014	Mixels	Lunk, Gobba, Balk	
2014	Adventure Time	Goose, Dr. Erik Adamkinson, Mayor	Episode: "Everything's Jake"
2014	Turbo Fast	Fleagor, Mosquito, Adolfo, Waterbug, Ritchie, Howie, Jack A. Lopez	
2014	TripTank	Sextus Scribnous	Episode: "Ahhh, Serenity"
2014–2016	The 7D	Bashful, various voices	
2015–2019	The Stinky & Dirty Show	Chill	
2016	Rolling with the Ronks!	Godzi	Replacing Dee Bradley Baker
2016	Star vs. the Forces of Evil	Hungry Larry	Episode: "Hungry Larry"
2016	Bunnicula	Dracula, Friendless Sven the Destroyer	3 episodes
2016	Robot Chicken	Doug Funnie, Waffleface	Episode: "Yogurt in a Bag"
2016	Mighty Magiswords	Herman, Pterodactyl, Spiffy the Sphinx	Episode: "Manlier Fish the Fishlier Man"
2016–2018	The Adventures of Puss in Boots	Angus, Thieves	3 episodes
2017	Be Cool, Scooby-Doo!	Sheriff Boon, Paco	Episode: "How to Train Your Coward"
2017–2019	Wacky Races	Muttley, Tiny, Huckleberry Hound, Snagglepuss, Quick Draw McGraw, Touche Turtle, Jabberjaw	
2018	Happy!	Raspberry	Episode: "The Scrapyard of Childish Things"
2018–2023	Disenchantment	Sorcerio, The Jester, Mertz, Pops the Elf, King Rulo the Elf	Netflix series
2019	Scooby-Doo and Guess Who?	Various voices	2 episodes
2019	Welcome to the Wayne	Baby Olly	Episode: "The Best Buddy I Never Had"
2020–present	Big City Greens	Nick Mulligan	Recurring role
2020–2021	Spitting Image	Joe Biden, Mitch McConnell, Vladimir Putin, Mark Zuckerberg, Rudy Giuliani, William Shatner	
2025	Theme Song Takeover	Nick Mulligan	Episode: "Grandpa Nick Takeover"

=== Video games ===
List of voice performances in video games
Year	Title	Role	Notes
1996	Nickelodeon 3D Movie Maker	Ren, Stimpy	
1997	Atomic Bomberman	Atomic Bomberman	
1999	Bugs Bunny: Lost in Time	Bugs Bunny, Elmer Fudd	
1999	Gabriel Knight 3: Blood of the Sacred, Blood of the Damned	Emilio Baza, Vampire	
1999	Tiny Toon Adventures: Toonenstein	Hamton J. Pig	
2000	Wacky Races	Muttley, Little Gruesome	
2000	M&M's: The Lost Formulas	Red	
2000	Baldur's Gate II: Shadows of Amn	Additional voices	
2000	Nicktoons Racing	Stimpy	Archival recording
2000	Looney Tunes Racing	Bugs Bunny, Elmer Fudd, Pepé Le Pew	
2000	Bugs Bunny & Taz: Time Busters	Bugs Bunny, Elmer Fudd	
2000	Looney Tunes: Space Race	Bugs Bunny, Elmer Fudd, Pepé Le Pew	
2001	Stupid Invaders	Bolok	
2001	Wacky Races: Starring Dastardly and Muttley	Muttley, L'il Gruesome	
2002	Spyro: Enter the Dragonfly	Additional voices	
2003	Rayman 3: Hoodlum Havoc	Murfy	
2003	Futurama	Philip J. Fry, Professor Farnsworth, Dr. Zoidberg, Zapp Brannigan	
2003	Crash Nitro Kart	Nash, Zam	
2003	I-Ninja	Ninja	
2004	The Adventures of Jimmy Neutron: Boy Genius: Attack of the Twonkies	Twonkies, One Man Band Player, Music Store Owner	
2006	Open Season	Toothy O'Toole, Ricky Sr.	
2007	The Legend of Spyro: The Eternal Night	Sparx	
2007	Nicktoons: Attack of the Toybots	Stimpy	
2007	The Simpsons Game	Dr. Zoidberg	
2008	Looney Tunes: Cartoon Conductor	Elmer Fudd	
2008	Wacky Races: Crash and Dash	Muttley	
2011	Nicktoons MLB	The Yak	
2013	Skylanders series	Fire Kraken, Freeze Blade, Food Fight, Chill Bill, Rocky Roll	
2015	Minecraft: Story Mode	Narrator, Siggie, Fanboy	
2021	Nickelodeon All-Star Brawl	Ren, Stimpy	Voiceover added in the June 2022 update
2022	Nickelodeon Kart Racers 3: Slime Speedway	Ren, Stimpy	
2023	Nickelodeon All-Star Brawl 2	Ren, Stimpy	
2026	Rayman Legends Retold	Murfy	

=== Live-action ===
List of acting performances in feature films
Year	Title	Role	Notes
2004	Comic Book: The Movie	Leo Matuzik	Direct-to-video
2011	Demoted	Robert Reilly	
2013	I Know That Voice	Himself	Documentary

== Discography ==
- Me-Pod (2004) Label under Universal Records (Philippines)

== See also ==
- The Magic Behind the Voices
