= Tiny Toon Adventures: Dizzy's Candy Quest =

2001 video game

- Cover art
- Developer: Formula
- Publisher: Swing! Entertainment
- Director: Mathijs de Jonge
- Platform: Game Boy Color
- Release: UK: October 2001
- Genre: Platform game
- Mode: Single-player

Tiny Toon Adventures: Dizzy's Candy Quest is the second Tiny Toon Adventures-related game released on the Game Boy Color, published in October 2001 by Swing! Entertainment. It was developed by Formula, a handheld division of Lost Boys Games.

== Plot ==
Montana Max builds a robot to steal all of the candy in the world for Elmyra Duff. The robot malfunctions and leaves them, so Montana and Elmyra clone Hamton J. Pig, Sweetie Pie, and Gogo Dodo, and other Tiny Toons characters in order to retrieve their broken robot. Dizzy Devil saves the robot, and the two team up to find the candy, stop Montana and Elmyra, and defeat the clones.

== Gameplay ==
The game features 25 levels and 5 boss levels. In each level, Dizzy has a specific number of candy to collect before the timer runs out. The level objectives are given by the robot, Stubby. To get the candies, Dizzy has to avoid traps, the clones, and not falling off the edge of the level. His spinning ability can be used to speed across various floors. The game also contains a password feature to allow access to all levels.

== Critical reception ==
The game was rated a 70% by GamesMaster.
