= Tiny Toon Adventures: Plucky's Big Adventure =

2001 video game

- Developer: Warthog
- Publishers: NA: Conspiracy Games; EU: Swing! Entertainment
- Platform: PlayStation
- Release: NA: September 25, 2001; GER: December 20, 2001; UK: January 6, 2002
- Genre: Platform
- Mode: Single-player

Tiny Toon Adventures: Plucky's Big Adventure is the third Tiny Toon Adventures-based game, developed by Warthog, published by Conspiracy Games and released on the PlayStation in North America in September 2001, and in Europe approximately three months later.

== Summary ==
Based on the "A Ditch in Time" episode of the series, Plucky attempts to build a time machine because he forgot to do his homework. However, he needs the help of his friends to find the needed parts to finish the time machine.

The player controls one of four characters, each in their own chapter: Plucky Duck, Hamton J. Pig, Babs Bunny, and Buster Bunny. The player hunts around Acme Looniversity to find the required items using clues picked up in the game. The player must then trade out items as found before finally obtaining the required item needed for the chapter. Additional characters from the series appear throughout the game to help. Elmyra Duff and Montana Max also appear, capturing the player if they can. The game ends with Plucky trying to go back in time, but his Time Machine breaks, throwing him against the wall.

== Reception ==
The game was not well reviewed by IGN, who said that "Plucky's Big Adventure is an abomination of a game", and rated the game a 2.3 out of 10. Official U.S. PlayStation Magazine gave the game 1.5 out of 5, and PSX Nation rated it 54%.
