= Tiny Toon Adventures (video game) =

1991 video game

- North American cover art
- Developer: Konami
- Publisher: Konami
- Director: Kazuyuki Yamashita
- Programmer: Yūji Shibata
- Artists: Kazumichi Ishihara; Hirotaka Fukuda
- Composers: Jun Funahashi; Masae Nakashima; Satoko Miyawaki
- Platform: Nintendo Entertainment System
- Release: JP: December 20, 1991
- Genre: Platformer
- Mode: Single-player

Tiny Toon Adventures (タイニートゥーンズ アドベンチャーズ, Tainītūnzu Adobenchā) is a platform video game for the NES. It was developed and published by Konami and released in 1991. It is the first Tiny Toon Adventures video game to be released for a video game console.

== Gameplay ==
Player controlling Buster

The player initially controls Buster Bunny in the effort to rescue Babs Bunny from her kidnapper, Montana Max (aka Monty). Before each world, the player can select an alternate character that they can switch into if they find a star ball. The three alternate characters are Dizzy Devil, Furrball, and Plucky Duck. Dizzy, Furrball, and Plucky have unique abilities that Buster lacks: Plucky can briefly fly and swim better than others, Dizzy can destroy walls and most enemies with his spin mode, and Furrball can climb many vertical surfaces, slowly sliding down them rather than plunging down. However, Buster can jump higher than others.

The first four worlds (The Hills, The Wetlands, The Trees, and Downtown) have three levels each while the remaining two worlds (Wackyland and Monty's Mansion) only have one level. Aiding Buster is Hamton, who will give Buster an extra lives for 30 carrots each. The second level in each world concludes with an enclosed area where the player must avoid Elmyra and exit through the door; if the player is grabbed by Elmyra, they must start the world over. The third level in each world concludes with a boss battle.

== Development and release ==
It is rumored that the game has stolen code from Nintendo's Super Mario Bros. 3. The two games share very similar run speed and acceleration.

Tiny Toon Adventures was released for the Family Computer in Japan on December 20, 1991.

== Reception ==
Reception

Review scores
Publication	Score
Aktueller Software Markt	9/12
Famitsu	6/10, 6/10, 7/10, 8/10
Joypad	93%
Joystick	93%
Official Nintendo Magazine	89%
Player One	89%
Total!	88%
Video Games (DE)	80%
VideoGames & Computer Entertainment	7/10
Zero	86/100
Entertainment Weekly	A−
Game Zone	80/100
Hippon Super!	7/10
Mean Machines	86%
Megablast	72%
N-Force	89%
Play Time	74%
Super Gamer	80%

According to Famitsu, Tiny Toon Adventures sold 11,572 copies during its lifetime in Japan. The game received generally favorable reviews from critics.

Nintendo Power had placed the game at 19th for March 1993 of their magazine regarding Top 20 NES games at that point.
