= Loons: The Fight for Fame =

2002 video game

- North American packaging artwork
- Developer: Warthog Games
- Publisher: Infogrames
- Platform: Xbox
- Release: NA: September 24, 2002; PAL: September 27, 2002
- Genre: Fighting
- Modes: Single player, multiplayer

Loons: The Fight for Fame is a cel-shaded fighting video game based on the classic Looney Tunes series. It was developed by Warthog Games, published by Infogrames, and released for the Xbox in 2002.

== Gameplay ==
The gameplay is somewhat similar to Capcom's Power Stone 2 game where four characters fight against each other in an arena with the aim being to knock opponents out. Each arena contains gizmos, which can be used against opponents, such as spring-loaded boxing gloves, falling anvils, and other Acme-related products.

A unique element is the star power system. Activating items and picking up scripts strewn about the arenas will fill a star meter. Attaining a full star meter can activate a minigame, most of which parody popular arcade classics such as Marvin the Martian in Galaxy Invaders parodying Space Invaders and Temple Run parodying Pac-Man. Sometimes, these serve as requirements during a one-player game mode.

== Story ==
Rocky and Mugsy, a pair of gangster antagonists from the Looney Tunes cartoon series, try to ruin a film studio through making extremely expensive movies so that they can buy all the studio's stock very cheaply. The two hire Yosemite Sam to be their director and prepare to try to find the worst possible actor to be the star of their movie, with the candidates for the position being the Looney Tunes characters Bugs Bunny, Daffy Duck, Sylvester the Cat, and the Tasmanian Devil.

== Development ==
The game was announced as an Xbox exclusive at E3 2001. The game was initially announced to be developed by an internal team at Infogrames' United Kingdom offices known as "Infogrames Manchester House".

== Reception ==
Reception

Aggregate scores
Aggregator	Score
GameRankings	52.75%
Metacritic	47/100

Review scores
Publication	Score
AllGame	2.5/5
GameSpot	4.4/10
GameZone	5.4/10
IGN	4.6/10
Official Xbox Magazine (UK)	6.5/10
Official Xbox Magazine (US)	7.3/10
X-Play	3/5

The game was met with generally mixed to negative reception upon release. The aggregate score on GameRankings is 52.75%, and on Metacritic it is 47 out of 100.
