= Richard Burns Rally =

2004 video game

- Developer: Warthog Games (Note: Gizmondo port developed by Gizmondo Studios Manchester.)
- Publisher: SCi Games (Note: Japanese version published by Kids Station Games (KSG). Gizmondo version published by Gizmondo Studios.)
- Producers: Lee Clare; Peter Hickman
- Platforms: PlayStation 2, Xbox, Windows, Gizmondo
- Release: PlayStation 2, Xbox: EU: 9 July 2004; AU: 16 July 2004; JP: 22 September 2005; Windows: EU: 3 September 2004; AU: 1 October 2004; Gizmondo: EU: 11 July 2005; NA: 22 October 2005
- Genre: Sim racing
- Modes: Single-player, multiplayer

Richard Burns Rally is a sim racing game, published by SCi and developed by Warthog with advice of WRC champion Richard Burns (1971–2005). It was released in 2004 for PlayStation 2 and Xbox in July, for Microsoft Windows in September, and in July 2005 for Gizmondo.

Although general reviews were mixed, the game is highly praised by rally game enthusiasts and sim racers due to its complex physics engine and realistic portrayals of real-life courses, and is now regarded as one of the greatest rally games ever created.

== Summary ==
The game features 8 cars and 36 courses. It simulates both classic and modern rallying, and is best known for its high difficulty and realistic physics engine.

This game is considered by many gamers to be one of the most realistic and difficult racing simulators. Richard Burns Rally initially did not come with official support for user-made content, but despite this, there are mods available due to a large online community, to which Warthog responded by releasing tools to aid in mod development. The game was originally an offline racing game but user-created mods have enabled online play. The Xbox version had online multiplayer through Xbox Live which was shut down on April 15, 2010. Richard Burns Rally is now playable online using replacement online servers for the Xbox called Insignia.

Shortly after the release of the game, Warthog was acquired by Tiger Telematics so that Warthog could develop games for their upcoming handheld console, the Gizmondo; the dramatic failure of the Gizmondo and the bankruptcy of Tiger Telematics in January 2006, the purchase of the publisher SCi Games by Square Enix, and the 2005 death of Richard Burns due to a brain tumor, meant that a sequel to the game was never produced.

== Development ==
The development team put particular care in making sure that the stages were as close to reality as possible. They had one or two people scouting each real life location - Gateshead forest, Nevada, Canberra, Hokkaido, the French Alps, and the Arctic Circle, sometimes going to actual real life rallies, with tools for activities such as texture photography. Road width, camber, and texture were points that were given special attention.

Richard Burns was involved in the development, giving feedback on handling dynamics in particular. Rally driver Possum Bourne and his mechanics were also involved, notably by giving feedback about the Canberra stages. Lead physics developer Eero Piitulainen said the following in 2023:

For me, the commercial part was largely unimportant. I remember that I didn't really care about that, but rather just wanted to get as close to reality as possible. But of course... It was very, very difficult and I remember SCi [Games] not really understanding that we were simulating reality closer and more faithfully realistic than any other game. ... Perhaps the thing that affected me the most was that it got pretty bad ratings from various gaming magazines that obviously hadn't been introduced to how real it really was or been informed by the publisher about what they could expect from our game. It was simply too difficult and was somewhat misunderstood because of this.

== Reception ==
Reception

Aggregate score
Aggregator	Score
GameRankings	76/100 (PS2); 67/100 (Xbox); 80/100 (PC)

Review scores
Publication	Score
Computer and Video Games	72/100
Edge	7/10
GamesMaster	88/100
GamesRadar+	3.5/5
Official Xbox Magazine (UK)	6.5/10
PC Format	80/100
PC Gamer (UK)	83/100
PC Zone	77/100
PSM3	66/100

The game had overall fairly positive reviews. It was renowned for its difficulty, with GamesRadar claiming it was "too unfriendly to be any fun".

In the years since its release, the game has become highly acclaimed among the sim racing community, particularly for the quality of its physics simulation, and is regarded as one of the greatest rally games ever produced. A dedicated modding community has grown around the game, which has allowed for updates to its physics model, sound, graphics, the addition of new cars and stages, and access to community-run online tournaments; the impact of the modding scene has been essential to the longevity of the game. The game has also been used as a training tool by professional WRC drivers such as Craig Breen and Teemu Suninen, and the FIA used it to teach rallying safety to stewards during the COVID-19 pandemic.

== See also ==
- Rally Championship, the previous rally game from the same developer and publisher.
