= Tiny Toon Adventures 2: Trouble in Wackyland =

1992 video game

- North American cover art
- Developer: Konami
- Publisher: Konami
- Programmers: Kenji Miyaoka; Kazuyuki Yamashita
- Composers: Hiroshi Takeyasu; Masae Nakashima; Sachiko Yakata
- Platform: NES
- Release: JP: November 27, 1992; NA: April 1993; EU: January 27, 1994
- Genre: Platformer
- Mode: Single-player

Tiny Toon Adventures 2: Trouble in Wackyland (originally released in Japan as Tiny Toon Adventures 2: Montana Land e Yōkoso (Tiny Toon Adventures 2 モンタナランドへようこそ; "Welcome to Montana Land")) is a Tiny Toon Adventures-based video game, released on the Nintendo Entertainment System in 1993, and developed and published by Konami. The story involves Montana Max inviting everyone to a new amusement park in Acme Acres, under the alias of a "secret admirer".

== Gameplay ==
Hamton on the train ride

There are five areas that the player can explore, each one starring a different character: Plucky rides a bumper car, Hamton rides a train, Babs rides a rollercoaster, Furrball dodges Sweetie on a log ride, and Buster explores a Funhouse. Similar to the game's predecessor, Roderick Rat and other villainous characters from the television show try to interfere with the Tiny Toons. Additional characters from the series make cameo appearances throughout the game.

Each ride costs a certain number of tickets, but as the player racks up points on the various rides, more tickets are earned. Eventually, when enough tickets have been earned, they can be saved until the player has enough to afford the entrance fee to the Funhouse, where Buster Bunny must then navigate numerous obstacles before squaring off with the "Secret Admirer", who turns out to be Montana Max.

== Reception ==
Reception

Review scores
Publication	Score
Electronic Gaming Monthly	6/10, 7/10, 7/10, 7/10
Famitsu	6/10, 4/10, 5/10, 5/10
HobbyConsolas	85/100
M! Games	55%
Total!	3+
VideoGames & Computer Entertainment	4/10
Consolemania	88/100
Electronic Games	78%
Megablast	72%
Nintendo Acción	85/100
Power Unlimited	8.6/10

Tiny Toon Adventures 2: Trouble in Wackyland was met with average reviews. Nintendo Power highlighted the use of a different character's ability in each stage, which added an inventive touch, but found the game's graphics a bit disappointing and its gameplay unforgiving. GamePro's Brother Buzz gave positive remarks to the game's overall audiovisual department, but felt its gameplay was somewhat two-dimensional and noted that the rides were deceptively challenging.
