= Star Trek: Invasion =

2000 video game

- Developer: Warthog Games
- Publisher: Activision
- Designer: Haydn Dalton
- Programmer: Mike Anthony
- Artist: Han Randhawa
- Writer: James Swallow
- Series: Star Trek
- Platform: PlayStation
- Release: NA: August 23, 2000
- Genre: Space combat simulator
- Modes: Single-player, multiplayer

Star Trek: Invasion is a video game, released in 2000 for the PlayStation console. The game was developed by Warthog Games and published by Activision. The game was developed by the same team (who were mostly working under Warthog Games) responsible for the Colony Wars series.

A "space combat shooter" title, Star Trek: Invasion is based on characters and situations from Star Trek: The Next Generation. The game features voice acting performances by several Star Trek actors, including Patrick Stewart (Jean-Luc Picard) and Michael Dorn (Worf).

== Development ==
Invasion was the first Star Trek game to be released for the Sony PlayStation. It was developed by Activision in conjunction with Warthog Games, who had previously created the Colony Wars series of games.

A Game Boy Advance version of the game was planned by Classified Games under license from Activision, but it was scrapped due to the publisher's problems.

== Reception ==
Reception

Aggregate score
Aggregator	Score
Metacritic	76/100

Review scores
Publication	Score
AllGame	4/5
CNET Gamecenter	7/10
Edge	6/10
Electronic Gaming Monthly	8.33/10 (Note: Two critics of Electronic Gaming Monthly gave the game each a score of 8/10, and the other gave it 9/10.)
EP Daily	9/10
Eurogamer	7/10
Game Informer	8.5/10
GameRevolution	B−
GameSpot	5.9/10
IGN	8/10
Next Generation	4/5
Official U.S. PlayStation Magazine	4.5/5
Maxim	8/10

The game received "generally favorable reviews" according to the review aggregation website Metacritic. Starlog praised the game, saying that it "delivers big and entertains" and said that the graphics were "great", but criticised the Star Trek experience saying that the music lacks the feeling of the franchise and the ships seen in the game don't match those which appeared on television or in the films. It added that players should be "pleased with the game" if they could sidestep the lack of a typical Gene Roddenberry/Star Trek feeling. John Gaudiosi of NextGen said of the game, "A textbook example of how to blend a popular license with solid console gameplay, this deep-space shooter offers an original Star Trek storyline and fun multiplayer action." GamePro said that the game "isn't an enthusiastic 'Engage,' and its story isn't up to Trek standards, but it does throw down the space-shooting gauntlet to be picked up by fans wishing to expand their experience of the venerable franchise." (Note: GamePro gave the game 4/5 for graphics, 3/5 for sound, and two 3.5/5 scores for control and fun factor.)

The game was nominated for the "Best Action Game" award at the Official U.S. PlayStation Magazine 2000 Editors' Awards, which went to Spider-Man.

In 2016, Tom's Guide ranked it as one of the top ten Star Trek games,
