= Tiny Toon Adventures: ACME All-Stars =

1994 video game

- North American cover art
- Developer: Konami
- Publisher: Konami
- Director: Noritoshi Kodama
- Composers: Masanori Oouchi; Seiya Murai
- Platform: Sega Genesis
- Release: NA: October 1994; PAL: November 1994
- Genre: Sports
- Modes: Single-player, multiplayer

Tiny Toon Adventures: ACME All-Stars is a Tiny Toon Adventures-based sports video game released on the Sega Genesis video game console. The game was developed and published by Konami in 1994.

== Gameplay ==
ACME All-Stars is a sports title that allows the player to make a team out of several iconic characters from the show. Characters in the game include Buster Bunny, Babs Bunny, Plucky Duck, Hamton J. Pig, Montana Max (aka Monty), Elmyra Duff, Shirley McLoon, Fifi La Fume, Calamity Coyote, Little Beeper, Furrball and Dizzy Devil.

There are five different games to choose from including basketball, soccer, bowling, an obstacle course race, and "Montana Hitting", a variant of whack-a-mole. In basketball and soccer, five separate themes are available for the respective sports court or field, one standard, and four variants with different obstacles placed in the playing area.

== Reception ==
Paul Bufton and Gus Swan reviewed the game for Mean Machines Sega magazine, Bufton noted the game featured an "unusual combination of fluffy cartoon characters and a challenging difficulty level" while Swan felt it lacked "any real feel or gameplay sophistication". The publication awarded the game a score of 78/100.

== See also ==
- Tiny Toon Adventures: Wacky Sports Challenge (1994) a similar Tiny Toons sports game developed for the SNES featuring a different set of sports.
