= Warthog Games =

British video game developer

Warthog Games Limited Warthog plc
- Type: Subsidiary
- Industry: Video games
- Founded: April 1997
- Defunct: 2006
- Fate: Dissolved
- Successor: TT Fusion
- Headquarters: Cheadle Hulme, Stockport, England
- Products: Starlancer; Star Trek: Invasion; Richard Burns Rally
- Parent: Tiger Telematics

Warthog Games Limited was a British video game developer, located in Cheadle Hulme, Stockport. It was a subsidiary of Warthog plc which had studios in Sweden and the United States.

The developer later developed titles as Gizmondo Europe, before the company disbanded; key staff formed Embryonic Studios and the brand was relaunched by CFAO as Warthog Entertainment.

== Subsidiaries ==
- Warthog: Texas: A subsidiary in Austin, Texas, US. On February 5, 2003, Warthog plc announced the acquisition of Fever Pitch Studios. On February 6, 2003, Fever Pitch Studios was renamed to Warthog: Texas.
- Warthog Sweden/42-bit AB: Originally Atod AB, and became Warthog Sweden/42-bit AB after being acquired in 2002.
- Zed Two: Acquired in 2002.

== History ==
Warthog was founded in April 1997, the core of the development team composed of ex-Electronic Arts personnel responsible for, amongst other titles, the hit Privateer 2: The Darkening. With this as the basis, Warthog began to develop something of a speciality in space-flight sims, with follow-up titles Starlancer (which sold over 330,000 units, mainly on PC) and Star Trek: Invasion (achieving over 230,000 units on PlayStation). Since 1999, the company also developed expertise in children's titles, with releases based upon well known franchises such as Tom and Jerry, Looney Tunes, Harry Potter and Asterix. Warthog was one of the companies considered to develop the game engine for BBC's game show FightBox.

In 2004, Warthog itself was acquired by Tiger Telematics including its subsidiaries. Warthog Plc was in financial trouble before the acquisition. Their focus from then on would be on the Gizmondo handheld console.

The studios later became a part of Gizmondo Studios. Collectively, the Cheadle and newly acquired Sweden studios became known as Gizmondo Europe, with the recently acquired Warthog Texas becoming Gizmondo Texas.

After Gizmondo went bankrupt, key staff from the original team established a new development company, Embryonic Studios.

Warthog were affiliated with the Manchester Metropolitan University course Computer Games Technology. They provided feedback on course content and a selection of placement jobs for third-year students.

== List of games ==
Name	Year	Platform	Publisher
Starlancer	2000	Windows	Microsoft Games
Star Trek: Invasion	2000	PlayStation	Activision
Tom and Jerry in House Trap	2000	PlayStation	NewKidCo
Tiny Toon Adventures: Buster Saves the Day	2001	Game Boy Color	Conspiracy Games
Tiny Toon Adventures: Wacky Stackers	2001	Game Boy Advance	Conspiracy Games
Tiny Toon Adventures: Plucky's Big Adventure	2001	PlayStation	Conspiracy Games
Rally Championship Xtreme	2001	Windows	Actualize
Loons: The Fight for Fame	2002	Xbox	Infogrames
Robot Wars: Extreme Destruction	2002	Game Boy Advance	BBC Multimedia
X2: Wolverine's Revenge	2003	PlayStation 2	Activision
Harry Potter and the Philosopher's Stone	2003	Multi (PS2, Xbox, GameCube)	EA
Rally Championship	2003	Multi (PS2, GameCube)	SCi
Mace Griffin: Bounty Hunter	2003	Multi (PS2, Xbox, Windows)	Vivendi Universal
Battlestar Galactica	2003	Multi (PS2, Xbox)	VU Games
Looney Tunes: Back in Action	2003	Multi (PS2, GameCube, Game Boy Advance)	Warner Bros. Interactive
Future Tactics: The Uprising	2004	Multi (PS2, Xbox, GameCube)	Crave Entertainment
Richard Burns Rally	2004	Multi (PS2, Xbox, Windows, Gizmondo)	SCi
Animaniacs: The Great Edgar Hunt	2005	Multi (PS2, Xbox, GameCube)	Ignition Entertainment
Animaniacs: Lights, Camera, Action!	2005	Multi (Nintendo DS, Game Boy Advance)	Ignition Entertainment

=== Cancelled titles ===
- BattleBots
- Momma Can I Mow the Lawn
- Johnny Whatever
- X10
- Conquest 2: The Vyrium Uprising
- Wrath & Skeller
- Fallen Kingdoms

BattleBots was a video game based on the BattleBots license for PlayStation 2 and GameCube. It got fairly far in development. Many screenshots were released to media outlets and it obtained a rating from the ESRB, but it was ultimately cancelled after the show was cancelled. However, prototypes of the game were sold on the BattleBots website for $299.98. Additionally, photographic evidence of the game being played proves that there are copies in existence, so the game could be brought to the Internet in the form of a ROM. It has been the dream of lead designer Zuby Ahmed to one day recreate this canceled game.

Momma Can I Mow The Lawn is a video game which started off in development for formats such as the PlayStation 2, but after the developer Warthog Games was purchased by Tiger Telematics to produce titles for the Gizmondo handheld console, it was moved to the Gizmondo. Tiger Telematics went bankrupt in 2006 when the Gizmondo was discontinued, and the status of this game is publicly unknown. It was most likely cancelled.

Johnny Whatever was announced on 20 July 2004 but was later cancelled. It was planned as an action game in a third-person environment, following a punk hero in a futuristic city who used his guitar as his weapon against villains. It started off in development for the PlayStation 2 and Xbox, but became a Gizmondo exclusive when the developer was purchased by Tiger Telematics, makers of the Gizmondo. The game was scheduled for a September 2006 release. A demo for the Gizmondo was made, but it was never released. Upon liquidation of Tiger Telematics and their UK subsidiary Gizmondo Europe in February 2006, the ownership of Johnny Whatever was sold back to the CEO of Warthog Games.
