= Tiny Toon Adventures: Wacky Sports Challenge =

1994 video game

- North American Super NES cover art
- Developer: Konami
- Publisher: Konami
- Platforms: Super NES, Game Boy
- Release: Super NES: JP: September 30, 1994; NA: January 1995; PAL: April 25, 1996; Game Boy: JP: November 25, 1994; NA: December 1994; EU: January 1995
- Genres: Party, sports
- Modes: Single-player, multiplayer

Tiny Toon Adventures: Wacky Sports Challenge (Note: released as Tiny Toon Adventures: Wild & Wacky Sports in Europe and Tiny Toon Adventures: Dotabata Daiundoukai in Japan) is a sports video game. The game was released in 1994 for the Super Nintendo Entertainment System and developed and published by Konami. It is based on the American children’s television series, Tiny Toon Adventures. It is one of the few SNES games to feature an SNES Multitap as a useable controller.

== Gameplay ==
The player can choose to play as a variety of characters from the series. Available characters were: Hamton, the Master of Ceremonies, Buster Bunny, Babs Bunny, Plucky Duck, Dizzy Devil

After choosing a character, the player can then choose to participate in various Olympic-style events. There are four difficulty levels, each with about six to seven events each. Events include: The Ice Cream Toss, The Chicken Dash, Weight Lifting, Saucer Throw, Bungee jumping, Birdman Contest, Freestyle Skiing, Pole Vault, Log Cutting, Swimming, Hammer Bash, and an Obstacle course.

=== Game Boy version ===
Tiny Toon Adventures: Wacky Sports (Note: Tiny Toon Adventures 3: Doki Doki Sports Festival in Japan) was released in 1994 on the Nintendo Game Boy and developed and published by Konami.

In Wacky Sports, the players choose to play as either Buster or Babs Bunny. As Babs, the player can participate in their own choice of sports activities, including baseball, soccer, or tennis. As Buster, the users can also play carnival games set up by side characters of the franchise.

If the Konami Code is used at the title screen, a level select feature becomes available.

== Reception ==
Reception

Review score
Publication	Score
Famitsu	6/10, 6/10, 8/10, 8/10 (SFC)

Power Unlimited gave the Game Boy version a review score of 49% writing: "Dull and lame action in this apparently quickly put together game in which the humor of the Tiny Toons does not come into its own at all."

== See also ==
- Tiny Toon Adventures: ACME All-Stars (1994) a similar Tiny Toons sports game developed for the Sega Genesis featuring a different set of sports.
