= Tiny Toon Adventures: Buster's Hidden Treasure =

1993 video game

- European box art
- Developer: Konami
- Publisher: Konami
- Programmers: Hidenao Yamane; Osamu Maruyama; Kōji Toyohara; Katsuyoshi Endō; Isao Akada
- Artists: Yoshiharu Kambe; Kenji Fujioka; Hitoshi Matsuda; Takemasa Miyoshi; Takayuki Nishiwaki; Masahiro Yoshihashi
- Composers: Hideto Inoue; Shinji Tasaka; Tsuyoshi Sekito
- Series: Tiny Toon Adventures
- Platform: Sega Genesis
- Release: NA: March 1993; EU: May 1993
- Genre: Platform
- Mode: Single-player

Tiny Toon Adventures: Buster's Hidden Treasure is the first Tiny Toon Adventures-based game released on the Sega Genesis. It was released in 1993 and developed and published by Konami. The game was not released in Japan, but was released in South Korea, where it was simply called Tiny Toons Adventures.

== Gameplay ==
Buster Bunny's mission in this game is to trace down and defeat Montana Max, who has stolen and hidden some treasure and rescue Babs Bunny. Many foes are in the way, including Roderick Rat and Gene Splicer, who has brainwashed several of Buster's friends, including Plucky Duck, Hamton J. Pig, Dizzy Devil and Calamity Coyote. Upon defeating Gene, the helmet controlling Buster's friends will fall off and explode, leaving them dazed or to fall down in a comical fashion (in the case of Calamity Coyote).

To complete each level, Buster must find Gogo Dodo, who will allow him to enter a portal. Additionally, Buster can find portals reminiscent of the show's rainbow-coloured logo, that will take Buster into Wackyland in the form of a bonus level. Here, Buster must attempt to collect as many items as he can before touching one of the numerous Dodos that populate the level.

== Reception ==
Reception

Review scores
Publication	Score
AllGame	4/5
MegaTech	95%
GamesMaster	81%
Mega	91%
Sega Force	91%
Power Unlimited	90%

Award
Publication	Award
MegaTech	Hyper Game

MegaTech magazine praised the graphics and sound, and many levels to explore in different landscapes such as woods and snow. Power Unlimited gave a review score of 90% writing: "Buster's Hidden Treasure is a lot of fun to play and good looking. The game is big and varied. Unfortunately, the sound isn't that great, and you can only play as Buster Bunny."
