= Tiny Toon Adventures: Wacky Stackers =

2001 video game

- Developer: Warthog
- Publishers: NA: Conspiracy Entertainment; EU: Swing! Entertainment
- Platform: Game Boy Advance
- Release: NA: December 30, 2001; EU: April 5, 2002
- Genre: Puzzle
- Mode: Single-player

Tiny Toon Adventures: Wacky Stackers is the first Tiny Toon Adventures video game released on the Nintendo Game Boy Advance. It was released on December 30, 2001, and was developed by Warthog and published by Conspiracy Games in North America and Swing! Entertainment in Europe. It is the first puzzle-style game for the franchise. The game features several characters from the television series, including: Buster Bunny, Montana Max, Elmyra Duff, Furrball, Babs Bunny, Plucky Duck, Gogo Dodo and Dizzy Devil.

== See More ==
Next Game: Tiny Toon Adventures: Buster's Bad Dream

== Gameplay ==
The player must stack dodo eggs, matching their colors to clear them. Each Tiny Toon has a helpful special ability that can be used if the player has the necessary amount of coins. Coins are earned from cracking open a big egg or performing a combo.

The game features several modes: Survival mode, Puzzle mode with 40 preset puzzles, "1P V Com" mode where players compete against another Tiny Toons character, and Multiplayer mode via the Game Link Cable accessory.

== Reception ==
Game review aggregation website Metacritic gave it 58% based on 5 reviews. IGN gave it a rating of 5/10. French gaming website Jeuxvideo.com gave it 14/20.
