= Tiny Toon Adventures 2: Montana's Movie Madness =

1993 video game

- North American cover art
- Developer: Konami
- Publisher: Konami
- Director: Kazuo Iwasaki
- Producer: Hiroyuki Fukui
- Programmer: Hisataka Inoue
- Artists: Fumimasa Katakami; Noboru Nakasaka
- Composer: Yoshiyuki Hagiwara
- Platform: Game Boy
- Release: NA: November 1993; JP: December 22, 1993; EU: 1993
- Genre: Platformer
- Mode: Single-player

Tiny Toon Adventures: Montana's Movie Madness (released in Japan as Tiny Toon Adventures 2: Buster Bunny no Kattobi Daibouken) is the second Tiny Toon Adventures game released on the Nintendo Game Boy. It was released in 1993 and was developed and published by Konami.

== Summary ==
Buster Bunny is inside a samurai movie; fighting Montana Max's henchmen in Feudal Japan.

Montana Max has opened a new theatre in Acme Acres. However, the only movies he shows are ones where he is the hero, and Buster Bunny is the villain. It's up to Buster Bunny to go into the films and change the plots. Buster is assisted by the crazy Gogo Dodo, and will encounter him in each movie, where he can get assistance from each of his friends.

At the end of each stage, Montana Max appears in a themed costume for each film, and challenges Buster to battle. Of course, other famous foes of Buster's will be there to try to stop him, including Roderick Rat.

There are five stages, with the first four being different films that Montana's showing, and the final stage is being held in the backlots of Montana's movie studio. Buster simply has to go through the stages before the time runs out. Collecting carrots along the way earns Buster extra lives and bonus points. By the end of a stage, Buster confronts Max as a boss. Defeating him, requires Buster to stomp on him five times. In between stages, Buster can participate in a bonus sports game against one of his friends or rivals.

== Reception ==
Reception

Review scores
Publication	Score
Power Unlimited	85%
Paisley Daily Express	17/20

Power Unlimited gave the game a score of 85% commenting: "Multifunctional platform game with many bonus levels. The quality is high, there is a lot to do and the game is quite spicy." Paisley Daily Express praised the game’s huge sprites, animation, inventive sub games and unexpected twists in the gameplay.
