= Tiny Toon Adventures: Toonenstein =

1999 video game

Tiny Toon Adventures: Toonenstein - Dare to Scare!
- European cover art
- Developer: Terraglyph Interactive Studios
- Publishers: NA: Vatical Entertainment; EU: Swing! Entertainment
- Platform: PlayStation
- Release: NA: November 02, 1999; EU: November 02, 1999
- Genre: Action Interactive Movie
- Mode: Single-player

Tiny Toon Adventures: Toonenstein: Dare to Scare is the second Tiny Toon Adventures video game released on the PlayStation. It was developed by Terraglyph Interactive Studios and published by Vatical Entertainment in North America and by Swing! Entertainment in Europe in 1999.

== Plot ==
Trapped inside Baroness Toonenstein's (Elmyra Duff) mansion, Furrball with panicky pals Plucky Duck and Hamton J. Pig, must avoid getting their brains swapped with Elmyra's cuddly creation and find the mansion's riches if they are able. In this haunted hide-n-seek, the only chance of escape is to redirect the mansion's "creepy" power and stop Elmyra in her nefarious machinations.

== Gameplay ==
The left and right direction keys move Furrball from one area of a room to another. The up direction key moves Furrball from one room to another and through Acme emergency exits. The X button activates and fires the bomb bat disablers. The triangle button stops using the bomb bat disabler. The circle button operates the mansion elevator (full power is required to enter). The square button activates control switches to gain power.

When activating control switches, random occurrences take place. If the icon switches to a clover, everything is fine. If the icon switches to Hamton's face, Hamton will be scared, preventing the player from using the elevator and the player must look for him. If the icon switches to a money bag the player will get a part of the code needed to operate the main generator. If the icon switches to a bomb bat, the player must quickly make their way to a disabler and use it before the bomb bats destroy the control switches. If the icon switches to the Baroness' face, the player must quickly make their way to an emergency Acme exit before she catches you. If the Baroness does capture the player, she will take them to the starting room. If a control switch is destroyed, it can be repaired by an angel bomb bat.
