= Tiny Toon Adventures: Buster Busts Loose! =

1992 video game

- North American cover art
- Developer: Konami
- Publisher: Konami
- Composers: Kazuhiko Uehara; Yukie Morimoto
- Platform: Super NES
- Release: JP: December 18, 1992; NA: February 1993; EU: June 24, 1993
- Genre: Platform
- Mode: Single-player

Tiny Toon Adventures: Buster Busts Loose! (released in Japan as Tiny Toon Adventures) is a video game for the Super NES console that is based on the animated TV series Tiny Toon Adventures. It was developed and published by Konami, released in 1992 in Japan and in 1993 in Europe and North America.

== Gameplay ==
This game features Buster Bunny in a side-scrolling adventure. It has three difficulty level settings: easy, normal, and hard. In-game, the modes are known as "Children", "Normal" and "Challenge" modes respectively; however, the Japanese version has easy and normal difficulties. Levels are significantly smaller in easy mode, and Buster only has one health container in hard mode, although extra containers can be collected by exploring the levels. The number of containers are reset after each level. This is done to add more of a challenge in this mode.

There are a total of six levels in the game when played normally (the fifth level is removed in easy mode). Buster's objectives vary from level to level, ranging from feeding Dizzy Devil so he stops destroying the school kitchen to defeating "Duck Vader". As is common for the era, the full ending is only accessed by finishing the game on hard (or normal in the Japanese release). After completing each level, the player is given a chance to earn extra lives by playing a minigame, the type of which is determined by spinning a wheel based on the one seen in the episode, "The Wheel O'Comedy".

== Reception ==
Reception

Review scores
Publication	Score
Computer and Video Games	94/100
Famitsu	6/10, 7/10, 6/10, 7/10
GameFan	91%, 98%, 92%, 94%
GamesMaster	92%
Official Nintendo Magazine	93/100
Super Play	89%
Total!	(UK) 87% (DE) 2
Control	86%
Hippon Super!	7/10
N-Force	85/100
Nintendo Game Zone	90/100
SNES Force	87%
Super Action	90%
The Super Famicom	72/100
Super Gamer	95%
Super Pro	95/100

Tiny Toon Adventures: Buster Busts Loose! received generally favorable reviews from critics.

IGN ranked the game 99th in their "Top 100 SNES Games of All Time" praising the game as a "impressively varied hop-and-bop platformer". In 2018, Complex placed the game 92nd on their "The Best Super Nintendo Games of All Time" describing the game as " Sheer platforming bliss". Nintendo Power rated the game the tenth best SNES game of 1993. In 1995, Total! listed the game 96th on its "Top 100 SNES Games."
