= List of Tiny Toon Adventures characters =

Several characters from the series. Left to right: Furrball, Elmyra Duff, Hamton J. Pig, Babs Bunny, Sweetie Bird, Buster Bunny, Plucky Duck, Montana Max, and Fifi La Fume

The characters in the American animated television series Tiny Toon Adventures and its reboot Tiny Toons Looniversity were created by animator Tom Ruegger. The series chronicles the adventures of Buster Bunny, Babs Bunny and their various friends in the fictional city of Acme Acres. Most of the characters are anthropomorphic animals and humans based on the Looney Tunes characters.

Tiny Toon Adventures features the voices of Charlie Adler, John Kassir, Tress MacNeille, Joe Alaskey, Don Messick, Kath Soucie, Gail Matthius, Maurice LaMarche, Danny Cooksey, Cree Summer, Candi Milo, Rob Paulsen and Frank Welker, while Tiny Toons Looniversity also features the voices of Eric Bauza, Ashleigh Crystal Hairston, David Errigo Jr. and Marieve Herington. Most one-off and background characters in each series are voiced by Jim Cummings, Greg Burson, Noel Blanc, Stan Freberg. In addition to the series' regular cast, various celebrities from a wide range of professions have voiced guest characters and recurring roles.

== Main characters ==
=== Buster Bunny ===
Buster Bunny (voiced by Charlie Adler in 1990–1992 of the original series and the cancelled 2002 video game, John Kassir in 1992–1999 of the original series, Eric Bauza in Tiny Toons Looniversity) is the leading main character of the show. Buster is a young blue-and-white male bunny rabbit with a red shirt (red hoodie in the reboot) and white gloves, and is Babs' best friend. In the last episode, It's a Wonderful Tiny Toon Christmas Special, Babs states that Buster is her boyfriend. Bugs Bunny is Buster's mentor. Adler voiced Buster in the cancelled video game Tiny Toon Adventures: Defenders of the Universe. Buster is based on the Chuck Jones version of Bugs Bunny.

In the Looniversity reboot, Buster is Babs' twin brother. Given the many different aspects of their personality traits, "Adventures" Buster and "Looniversity" Buster are practically two different characters. In "Extra, So Extra", his middle name is "Filmore."

=== Babs Bunny ===
Barbara Anne "Babs" Bunny (voiced by Tress MacNeille in 1990–2002 of the original series, Ashleigh Crystal Hairston in Tiny Toons Looniversity) is a main character of the show. Babs likes doing impressions and wearing disguises and dislikes being addressed by her full name. She is a young pink female bunny rabbit with a yellow shirt, purple jacket in the reboot, violet skirt, and violet bows on her ears. Babs is based on the Bob Clampett version of Bugs Bunny.

In Looniversity, a different version of Babs is "Looniversity" Buster's twin sister. It also shows an episode of Babs and Lola together for the first time with the adult female rabbit being her mentor.

=== Plucky Duck ===
Plucky Duck (voiced by Joe Alaskey in 1990–2013 of the original series, Nathan Ruegger as "Little Plucky" in 1991–1994 of the original series, and David Errigo Jr. in Tiny Toons Looniversity) is a young green male duck in a white tank top. Plucky is based on Chuck Jones' Daffy Duck. Plucky is friends with Babs Bunny, Hamton J. Pig and Buster Bunny, despite the fact that they frequently annoy each other. Plucky is quite jealous of Buster and Babs's popularity, similar to Daffy's insane jealousy of Bugs's popularity, and very often tries to undermine it in various sneaky, underhanded ways. That said, Plucky is many times shown to be caring and genuinely heroic. Plucky constantly pines for the love of Shirley the Loon, though she has very little patience for him even though she favors him out of any other men.

In Looniversity, Plucky's real name is revealed to be Pluciferous von Mallard Duck and he wears a black shirt instead of white tank tops. In the series, he seems to have come from a more wealthy background due to having a more snobbish attitude with a less antagonistic and vastly more egotistic behavior and takes cartoon acting more seriously. He also loves competing with Buster. In the episode "Spring Beak", his parents are revealed to be world travelers named Ralph and Maria and he always calls them by their first names rather than mom and dad.

=== Hamton J. Pig ===
Hamton J. Pig (voiced by Don Messick in 1990–1995 of the original series, Billy West in 1997–2002, David Errigo Jr. in Tiny Toons Looniversity) is a young pink male pig who wears blue overalls. Based on Porky Pig, Hamton's role in the series is as a straight man, often against Plucky Duck's antics. The only difference is that unlike his mentor Porky, Hamton never stutters. Hamton is an overeater who is obsessed with cleanliness. In one episode, it is revealed that he is interested in Fifi La Fume. Billy West took over the role of Hamton in a few video games after Don Messick's death, including 1999's Tiny Toon Adventures: Toonenstein.

In Looniversity, Hamton wants to be a doctor while doing performances and suffers from indecisiveness. His mother was changed to Joan, who attended ACME Looniversity which led to becoming a famous performer and hopes her son follows her footsteps. He is also given a stutter just like Porky, as well as a Southern accent.

=== Fifi La Fume ===
Fifi La Fume (voiced by Kath Soucie in 1990–2002 of the original series, Marieve Herington in Tiny Toons Looniversity) is a young, purple and white female skunk with a pink bow in her hair. Based on Pepé Le Pew, she shares his character traits of having a French accent and aggressively seeking romance, only to find the object of her affection is repulsed by her odor and aggressive advances. Unlike Pepé Le Pew, Fifi feels more hurt by rejection and even bursts into tears about it. Fifi often unsuccessfully attempts to chase males who have ended up with white stripes painted down their backs, such as Furrball, Calamity Coyote, and Little Beeper. Fifi does not mind if males chase her and can control her stench, although it sometimes can be triggered when she becomes romantically in love. Some episodes downplay her romantic life, and show her doing random group activities with other characters. She lives in a striped 1959 Cadillac in a wrecking yard. Hamton is one of the few boys who genuinely love her back, and he has attended the Looniversity prom with her.

In Looniversity, she wears a black sweater, is French-Canadian, and is less focused on romance.

=== Shirley McLoon ===
Shirley "The Loon" McLoon (voiced by Gail Matthius in 1990–2002 of the original series, Natalie Palamides in Tiny Toons Looniversity) is a young loon citizen of Acme Acres. She is based on Daffy Duck's main love interest, Melissa Duck. She speaks with a thick Valley girl accent. Although she seems reasonably intelligent, she is obsessed with superficial New Age paraphernalia. Her name is a pun on fellow New Age aficionado Shirley MacLaine, and she later appeared in an episode of Animaniacs, standing next to MacLaine. She can tell fortunes, obtains psychokinetic powers, and is a skilled ballerina; the former hobbies earning her the derisive nickname "Shirley the Loon". She appears not to notice the negative connotations of the nickname and often recites "Oh, what a loon I am" while meditating. Shirley is romantically pursued by Plucky Duck and Fowlmouth, although she seems to tolerate Plucky's self-centeredness more than Fowlmouth's publicly embarrassing crude behavior and bad language. Despite her annoyance with Plucky's flirtatious gestures, Shirley does seem to care for him and occasionally dates him. Shirley often hangs out with Babs and Fifi.

In Looniversity, Shirley serves as the RA for Merry Melodies hall while also being a student, with her new design includes her hairstyle, wearing glasses, has earrings on her sides and she wears a skirt that covers her bottom instead of it being exposed. She has a different accent and no longer uses the words like or junk in her sentences.

=== Montana Max ===
Montana Max (voiced by Danny Cooksey in 1990–2002 of the original series, Candi Milo in Tiny Toons Looniversity), nicknamed "Monty", is a young brown-haired boy and the main antagonist. He is an evil, loud-mouthed, and money-hungry tycoon. Monty has an American location in his name and is often an enemy to Buster Bunny, much like Yosemite Sam is to Bugs Bunny; similarly, the character may reference the addition of Sam to Bugs Bunny shorts to create a threatening antagonist, as the pilot episode compares him to the other "pushover" villains. Like Elmyra, Monty is a human and attends Acme Looniversity. He is portrayed as a very wealthy and stubborn boy who lives in a mansion and does not have any siblings or friends. However, he does have a (rarely shown) sweet side like finding out where meat comes from in "Slaughterhouse Jive" and has been shown to have a good imagination with help from the personification of his imagination as seen in "Fit to Be Toyed". Some episodes that he stars in features his parents whose heads are never seen and are shown to keep him in line. Elmyra likes Monty a lot, though he usually feels nothing but annoyance towards her. Max once had to tolerate Elmyra in "My Dinner with Elmyra" because his parents have become friends with Elmyra's parents according to his mother, but after Elmyra kissed him at the end of the date, he said to himself in private that he thought he was in love.

In Looniversity, Montana Max has the personality of a con artist.

== Recurring characters ==
=== Elmyra Duff ===
Elmyra Duff (voiced by Cree Summer in both shows) is a redheaded young girl who wears a blue blouse, white skirt, black Mary Janes over white socks, and a blue bow with a skull at the center. Her design and name are a play on Elmer Fudd; much like her surname, she is also a reversal, having a crushing affection for animals that makes her unintentionally dangerous initially falling into the stereotype of the "spoiled and piercing-voiced girl." She is one of the few human characters in the series and she attends Acme Looniversity with the animal characters, where she also serves as the nurse. In two episodes, Elmyra's family is shown, including her mother, inventor father, typical '90s teen sister, younger brother, and super-strong baby brother, as well as a maid.

Elmyra was also featured as a co-protagonist and ally to Pinky and the Brain in the spin-off Pinky, Elmyra & the Brain. Though initially claimed by Cree Summer to be removed from the show, Elmyra appears in Tiny Toons Looniversity as a photographer obsessed with taking pictures of animals. She also appeared in Animaniacs, in the episode segment “Lookit The Fuzzy Heads”, attending a group therapy session with Yakko, Wakko, and Dot Warner.

=== Furrball ===
Furrball (vocal effects provided by Frank Welker in 1990–2002 of the original series, voiced by Rob Paulsen in "Duck Trek", Natalie Palamides in Tiny Toons Looniversity) is a young, blue male cat with a hole in his right ear and a bandage on his tail. Furrball is usually depicted as living in a cardboard box in an alleyway, although he is sometimes shown as one of Elmyra's pets and briefly had a home with Mary Melody. He is a peaceful and innocent character, but he is also one of the most unfortunate characters in the show, since he is almost always chased, abused, or bullied, often by being squashed. For example, during the intro credits, he gets flattened by a falling upright piano to the lyric of "Furrball is unlucky", while peacefully sniffing a flower. Furrball is based on Penelope Pussycat and the Chuck Jones version of Sylvester the Cat (his in-universe mentor). Furrball himself is usually depicted as behaving more like a normal cat with a few exceptions; Tiny Toons Loonversity anthropomorphizes Furrball by more frequently putting him in clothing and giving him speaking roles. Furrball often chases Sweetie Pie, who is based on Tweety. He is chased once by Fifi La Fume after being mistaken for a skunk and, when his stripe is washed off, he cheers her up by painting stripes on two other cats.

In one speaking role ("Cinemaniacs"), he was voiced by Rob Paulsen in a mockup of Leonard McCoy from Star Trek. He also has another very brief speaking role in the episode "Buster and the Wolverine".

=== Sweetie Bird ===
Sweetie Bird (AKA Sweetie Pie; voiced by Candi Milo in 1990–1992 of the original series, Tessa Netting in Tiny Toons Looniversity) is a young pink female canary with a light blue ribbon bow in her plumage. She is based on the Bob Clampett version of Tweety. Like her predecessor, she is colored pink and is devious around feline enemies like Furrball. Sweetie chases Bookworm with about the same success as Furrball. Though it is only seen in one episode, Sweetie, like Plucky, is also quite jealous of Buster and Babs's popularity and is the only character other than Plucky to openly speak up about it. In one scene, she was cared for by an eagle until he realized that she was too crazy and dangerous to be around. She sometimes switches from her babyish voice to a louder, more obnoxious voice.

In Looniversity, Sweetie has been promoted to a main character with few antagonistic personality traits and more of a tomboyish, punk rock act. She likes to keep her side of the room messy, as she is colorblind and thus uses odors to pick out her clothes. Sweetie serves as both Babs's roommate and best friend. Sweetie also reveals that, unlike the original series that did not feature or mention her family, she has two mothers and is an only child. Sweetie is revealed to be non-binary and queer as she uses she/they pronouns and has dated women before.

=== Dizzy Devil ===
Dizzy Devil (voiced by Maurice LaMarche in 1990–2002 of the original series, Betsy Sodaro in Tiny Toons Looniversity) is a young lavender male Tasmanian devil with a yellow propeller cap, as well as one pink eye and one green eye, and is also crosseyed. He is based on the Tasmanian Devil, and he spins around like a tornado and eats constantly like him. Also like Taz, his speech is generally monosyllabic or composed of random noises. Unlike Taz, his simpler design has no ears, horns, or tail. Dizzy has an implausible charisma towards attractive women (usually shown as a trio) that baffles male onlookers, such as Montana Max. Dizzy meets them in an episode where he fell in love with a little tornado, thinking that it is another Tasmanian Devil. When the tornado leaves the city, Dizzy becomes depressed, so the trio of young ladies take pity on him and decide to pet him.

In Looniversity, Dizzy works as an assistant to Taz at the campus coffee shop "Loo Broo".

=== Gogo Dodo ===
Gogo Dodo (voiced by Frank Welker in 1990–2002 of the original series) is a young green male dodo with blue shoes and a pink and purple umbrella sticking out from the top of his head. Gogo performs various bizarre sight gags and stunts. Unlike the other characters who attend Acme Looniversity, Gogo makes his home in the Daliesque realm on the outskirts of Acme Acres known as Wackyland, a surreal place with constantly changing backgrounds even avoided by the sillier characters for its chaotic nature. Gogo is the only student actually related to one of the Looney Tunes characters—he is a relative of the Dodo bird in Porky in Wackyland, who was retroactively named Yoyo Dodo. Gogo's catchphrase is "It's been surreal!"

=== Calamity Coyote ===
Calamity Coyote (vocal effects provided by Frank Welker in 1990–1995 of the original series) is a young, gray male coyote with pink sneakers; he is based on Wile E. Coyote. Calamity never speaks, instead communicating through noises and signs that he pulls out from behind his back. Calamity is also shown to be scientifically proficient, constructing random devices for the other characters. He pursues Little Beeper reluctantly. Like Wile E., Calamity's devices frequently malfunction. Calamity is less antagonistic than Wile E., preferring to work on his various inventions rather than chase Little Beeper.

In Looniversity, Calamity is never shown chasing Little Beeper, whether willingly or not.

=== Little Beeper ===
Little Beeper (voiced by Frank Welker in 1990–1995 original series, archive audio of Paul Julian in Tiny Toons Looniversity) is a young roadrunner with red and orange feathers and blue sneakers. Much like his Looney Tunes counterpart, the Road Runner, Beeper spends most of his time outrunning and avoiding capture by Calamity Coyote. Unlike the Road Runner, Beeper can giggle, laugh and make other sounds, but he doesn't speak.

In Looniversity, Beeper's "meep-meep" noise is the same as the Road Runner's, compared to the original in which his "meep-meep" noise was more higher pitched. He also has no rivalry with Calamity in the reboot.

=== Li'l Sneezer ===
Li'l Sneezer (voiced by Kath Soucie in 1990–1995 of the original series, Tessa Netting in Tiny Toons Looniversity) is based on Sniffles from the Looney Tunes shorts. However, his extremely talkative personality is based on Little Blabbermouse. He is a young, gray male mouse who wears a diaper. He is shown to be allergic to many things. His allergies trigger exaggerated, explosive, gale-forced sneezes capable of seriously damaging or destroying buildings, as Elmyra had the misfortune of finding out. He is the youngest of the students at Acme Looniversity, as he is the only one seen wearing diapers. Due to his small size, he sometimes spends time with other smaller students like Sweetie.

== Supporting characters ==
=== Arnold the Pit Bull ===
Arnold the Pit Bull (voiced by Rob Paulsen in the original series and David Errigo Jr. in Tiny Toons Looniversity) is a white, muscular, male pit bull with a pair of black sunglasses, parodying Arnold Schwarzenegger as well as speaking in his accent. He is one of the few characters who does not attend Acme Looniversity and is not based on an existing Warner Bros. character, though there is some connection between him and Hector the Bulldog from the Sylvester and Tweety shorts, as he often clashes with Furrball in a similar way to Hector clashing with Sylvester.

Arnold has various jobs including lifeguard, doorman, zookeeper, security guard, bouncer, and gym owner and often works for Montana Max in some episodes. He hails from Romania as mentioned in the episode "It's Buster Bunny Time" which explains his strong accent. His love interest is another white muscular pit bull named Arnolda.

=== Byron Basset ===
Byron Basset (vocal effects provided by Frank Welker) is a brown, black and white male Basset Hound, generally portrayed as being slow and lazy. He is based on Looney Tunes' many dog characters, specifically Barnyard Dawg. One sight gag involves him turning around: to do so, he pulls his head and tail inside the folds of his body, then pulls them out the other side. He is also shown to be capable of flight, as seen in the movie Tiny Toon Adventures: How I Spent My Vacation, using his stretchy skin to glide on a waft of air. Byron is sometimes shown as one of Elmyra's pets. His end tag is a simple "woof".

=== Fowlmouth ===
Fowlmouth (voiced by Rob Paulsen) is a young, white male rooster with a blue, short-sleeved shirt. He is based on Foghorn Leghorn, though he speaks in a New York accent instead of a Southern accent. Fowlmouth is shown to be very polite when calm but when his short temper is provoked, he launches into a bleeped-out swearing tirade. In his first appearance, he was even shown to pepper all of his sentences with profanity, but he curbs this when children are around. Other appearances show him using euphemisms instead, likely due to Buster's efforts to train him out of swearing in the premiere episode. Fowlmouth's profane catchphrase is "dadgum". In Tiny Toon Adventures: How I Spent My Vacation, he annoys people in a theater by talking about the movie plotline.

=== Mary Melody ===
Mary Melody (voiced by Cindy McGee in 1990 of the original series, Cree Summer in 1990–1994 of the original series) is a young African-American human girl. Her name is a pun on the Merrie Melodies series of Warner Brothers shorts. She is based on Granny as shown by her occasionally owning Furrball and Sweetie, and being much friendlier than her fellow human peers Montana Max and Elmyra Duff. Mary attends Acme Looniversity with the other characters and sometimes hangs out with Babs, Shirley, and Fifi. Mary lives in an apartment building in the city of Acme Acres.

=== Bookworm ===
Bookworm (voiced by Frank Welker) is a green male worm with large glasses. He is based on the bookworm companion of Sniffles. He works at the Acme Looniversity library and is shown to be well-read and proficient on the computer. In some scenes, he is pursued by Sweetie. Bookworm does not speak; however, he does say something just before the football game in Tiny Toon Adventures: Buster Busts Loose! on the SNES, though it is only on-screen text. He also speaks and give you instructions on the bonus games in Tiny Toon Adventures 2: Montana's Movie Madness for the Gameboy. Though it's only on-screen text as well.

=== Concord Condor ===
Concord Condor (voiced by Rob Paulsen) is a young, purple male condor. He attends Acme Looniversity and lives in Acme Acres. He is based on Beaky Buzzard. Concord is shy and dimwitted, often ending sentences in "nope nope nope nope," or "yup yup yup yup." He lives at Acme Zoo, where he spends most of his time relaxing in his nest and watching TV. His first name is pronounced the same as the supersonic airliner, the Concorde, in spite of being spelled the same as the town in Massachusetts.

=== Barky Marky ===
Barky Marky (vocal effects provided by Frank Welker) is a brown bulldog. He is based on Marc Antony, and is portrayed as a typical canine who loves to play fetch and various other sports and activities. Even though Barky starred in his very own short entitled "Go Fetch" with Elmyra Duff, and made many cameo appearances in other episodes, specials, and movies, Barky Marky was still mocked for his lack of appearances on the Saturday Night Live spoof Weekday Afternoon Live. When Buster Bunny is reading the news out loud from the viewers complaining about him not being in enough episodes, Babs Bunny, posing as a Tiny Toons casting director, asks "Who's Barky Marky?

=== B'Shara Bunny ===
B'Shara Bunny (voiced by Kari Wahlgren) is the mother of Buster and Babs Bunny in Tiny Toons Looniversity.

== Looney Tunes characters ==
=== Acme Looniversity staff ===
The faculty of Acme Looniversity is made up of classic Looney Tunes characters that some of the students are based on:

==== Teachers ====
- Bugs Bunny (voiced by Jeff Bergman in most episodes and Tiny Toons Looniversity, Greg Burson in "Buster and Babs Go Hawaiian", "Best of Buster Day" and "It's a Wonderful Tiny Toons Christmas Special") is the principal and mentor of Buster Bunny. In Looniversity, Bugs is just a professor of a major class.
- Lola Bunny (voiced by Kari Wahlgren) is a sports teacher and a chef at Acme Looniversity and the mentor of Babs Bunny in Looniversity.
- Daffy Duck (voiced by Jeff Bergman in most episodes, Joe Alaskey in the bumper segment of "New Character Day", Greg Burson in "Two-Tone Town", Eric Bauza in Tiny Toons Looniversity) is a teacher who serves as the mentor of Plucky Duck.
- Porky Pig (voiced by Bob Bergen in "Animaniacs", "Hero Hamton" and Tiny Toons Looniversity, Rob Paulsen in "The Wacko World of Sports", Noel Blanc in "Fields of Honey", "The Acme Bowl" and "Hero Hamton", Joe Alaskey in "Music Day", Greg Burson in "It's a Wonderful Tiny Toons Christmas Special") is a teacher at Acme Looniversity who is the mentor of Hamton J. Pig. In Looniversity, Porky acts as the student activities finance advisor.
- Pepé Le Pew (voiced by Greg Burson) is a teacher at Acme Looniversity who is the mentor of Fifi La Fume.
- Penelope Pussycat
- Tweety (voiced by Jeff Bergman in "The Looney Beginning" and "How Sweetie It Is", Bob Bergen in "Animaniacs", Eric Bauza in Tiny Toons Looniversity) is a teacher who is the mentor of Sweetie.
- Elmer Fudd (voiced by Jeff Bergman in "Her Wacky Highness", "Psychic Fun-omenon Day", "Tiny Toon Music Television", "K-ACME TV", "Viewer Mail Day", Greg Burson in "Journey to the Center of Acme Acres", "Wake Up Call of the Wild", "Fields of Honey", "Spring in Acme Acres", "Here's Hamton" and "Weekday Afternoon Live", Joe Alaskey in How I Spent My Vacation, Eric Bauza in Tiny Toons Looniversity) is a teacher who is the mentor of Elmyra Duff. In Tiny Toons Looniversity, he is a former teacher looking for lost treasure.
- Yosemite Sam (voiced by Joe Alaskey in "Gang Busters", "Music Day" and "Best of Buster Day", Charlie Adler in "The Wide World of Elmyra", Jeff Bergman in "Looniversity Daze", "Son of Looniversity Daze" and "K-ACME TV", Maurice LaMarche in "Two-Tone Town", Fred Tatasciore in Tiny Toons Looniversity) is the mentor of Montana Max. In "Best of Buster Bunny Day", Yosemite Sam was the vice-principal of Acme Looniversity. In Looniversity, he appears working as the campus' security guard.
- Sylvester the Cat (voiced by Joe Alaskey in "Test Stressed", "The Wacko World of Sports" and "The Acme Bowl", Jeff Bergman in "Animaniacs", "Viewer Mail Day", "Son of the Wacko World of Sports" and Tiny Toons Looniversity) is a teacher who is the mentor of Furrball.
- The Tasmanian Devil (voiced by Jeff Bergman in "Prom-ise Her Anything" and "Animaniacs", Noel Blanc in "You Asked For It, Pt. 1", Maurice LaMarche in "Ask Mr. Popular", Greg Burson in "Best of Buster Day", Fred Tatasciore in Tiny Toons Looniversity) is the mentor of Dizzy Devil. In Looniversity, Taz runs the campus coffee shop called "Loo Bru".
- Wile E. Coyote (voiced by Joe Alaskey in the original series) is a teacher who is the mentor of Calamity Coyote. In Looniversity, he is the science professor.
- The Road Runner (archive audio of Paul Julian) is a teacher who is the mentor of Little Beeper.
- Foghorn Leghorn (voiced by Jeff Bergman in most episodes and in Tiny Toons Looniversity, Greg Burson in "Buster and Babs Go Hawaiian") is a teacher who is the mentor of Fowlmouth (though this is rarely depicted in the show). In Looniversity, he is the gym coach.

==== Other staff members ====
- Granny (voiced by June Foray in the original series, Candi Milo in Tiny Toons Looniversity) serves as the Head School Nurse. In the "Looniversity Daze" short "What's Up Nurse", Granny is the nurse's office receptionist. In the "Best O' Plucky Duck Day" cartoon "One Minute Til Three", Granny is a computer animation teacher and a recurring gag has her angrily assigning a thousand-page book report to students who get her questions wrong which she demands to be completed by Monday. Granny was rewritten into a Dean in Looniversity and retains a wild side to do action sports while understanding the university bylaws.
- Speedy Gonzales (voiced by Joe Alaskey in the original series) is the track coach and sports announcer. He is the mentor of Lightning Rodriguez (although rejected due to fear of backlash over the portrayal of Hispanics).
- Pete Puma (voiced by Stan Freberg in most episodes of the original series, Joe Alaskey in "Going Places") works as a janitor.

=== Other Looney Tunes characters ===
The following characters have made occasional appearances in this show:

- Beaky Buzzard (voiced by Rob Paulsen) – He made a cameo in the episode "High Toon".
- Big Bee (voiced by Frank Welker) – He appeared in the episode "Two-Tone Town" where he is friends with Foxy, Roxy, and Goopy Geer. He is based on the bee from You're Too Careless with Your Kisses!
- Bosko and Honey (voiced by Don Messick and B.J. Ward) – They appeared in the episode "Fields of Honey" and have been redesigned to look like dog-like creatures.
- Cecil Turtle – He made a cameo in "Going Places" as the bus driver.
- Charlie Dog (voiced by Frank Welker) – He made occasional appearances in the series.
- Count Bloodcount (voiced by Frank Welker) – He appeared in the episodes "Stuff That Goes Bump in the Night" and "What Makes Toons Tick".
- Foxy and Roxy (voiced by Rob Paulsen and Desiree Goyette) – They appeared in the episode "Two-Tone Town" where they are friends with Big Bee and Goopy Geer. Here, they are slightly re-designed to look less like Mickey and Minnie Mouse.
- Goopy Geer (voiced by Robert Morse) – He appeared in the episode "Two-Tone Town" where he is friends with Big Bee, Foxy, and Roxy.
- Gossamer (vocal effects by Frank Welker in "Cinemaniacs" and "What Makes Toons Tick", Maurice LaMarche in "Night Ghoulery", Eric Bauza in Tiny Toons Looniversity) – He appeared in the episodes "Cinemaniacs", "What Makes Toons Tick", and "Night Ghoulery".
- Gremlins
- Henery Hawk
- Hubie and Bertie
- Hugo the Abominable Snowman (voiced by Joe Alaskey)
- Marc Antony
- Marvin the Martian (voiced by Joe Alaskey in the original series, Eric Bauza in Tiny Toons Looniversity) – He made a few appearances in the show with a major role in "Return to the Acme Acres Zone". In Looneversity, Marvin was a former space hero but lost to an alien species and returned to Earth where he lives in his rocket like a bum and grows a beard. He made a triumphant return to space with help from the students. Marvin is also a part time astrophysics professor.
- Michigan J. Frog (voiced by John Hillner in the original series, Fred Tatasciore in Tiny Toons Looniversity) – He made appearances in "The Wide World of Elmyra" and "Psychic Fun-omenon Day". In Tiny Toons Looniversity, he appears in the episode "Souffle, Girl Hey" as the host of a cooking show "Top Hat Chef", a parody of Top Chef.
- Playboy Penguin – He made a cameo in the episode "Prom-ise Her Anything".
- Rocky and Mugsy (voiced by Rob Paulsen and Frank Welker) – They appear as juvenile hall inmates in "Gang Busters".
- Sam Sheepdog
- The Three Bears (voiced by Frank Welker, Tress MacNeille, and Stan Freberg) – Pa Bear, Ma Bear, and Junior Bear appeared in two episodes where they were often paired with Elmyra. In the episode "Here's Hamton", Ma Bear was seen as a lunch lady at Acme Looniversity.
- Witch Hazel (voiced by Tress MacNeille in "What Makes Toons Tick", June Foray in "Night Ghoulery", Candi Milo in Tiny Toons Looniversity)

== Minor characters ==
=== Tyrone Turtle ===
Tyrone Turtle (voiced by Edan Gross in 1990 of the original series) is a little green male turtle with a hard shell, based on Cecil Turtle, a minor Looney Tunes character. Tyrone Turtle is seen in a few episodes such as "Hare Today, Gone Tomorrow", and "The Wide World of Elmyra". He appears in "Looniversity".

=== Marcia the Martian ===
Marcia the Martian (voiced by Tress MacNeille in 1991 of the original series) is Marvin the Martian's apprentice and niece, and she only appears in "Duck Dodgers Jr.". Unlike Marvin, Marcia is more friendly and playful, more into toys and making friends, which included Plucky Duck.

=== Roderick and Rhubella Rat ===
Roderick and Rhubella Rat (voiced by Charlie Adler and Tress MacNeille) are rats who are minor characters and students from Perfecto Prep, a rival school of Acme Looniversity. Rodrick and Rhubella are rivals to Buster and Babs, and stand in for Disney characters Mickey and Minnie Mouse. Rodrick and Rubella are portrayed as snooty, rich brats who believe they are above everyone else, but always get outsmarted by the rabbits. Rhubella Rat and Margot Mallard are two of the three main cheerleaders for Perfecto Prep.

In "Looniversity", rather than being students at Perfecto Prep, Roderick and Rhubella are instead students at ACME University.

=== Danforth Drake and Margot Mallard ===
Danforth Drake and Margot Mallard (voiced by Rob Paulsen and Kath Soucie), like Roderick and Rhubella Rat, are ducks who are minor characters and students of Perfecto Prep. They stand in for Disney characters Donald and Daisy Duck. Danforth Drake and Roderick Rat are roommates, and both are members of Perfecto Prep's sports teams. Both Rubella Rat and Margot Mallard are two of the three main cheerleaders for Perfecto Prep. The couple is similar to Plucky and Shirley.

=== Banjo Possum ===
Banjo Possum (voiced by Rob Paulsen), originally called "Woodpile Possum", is one of the minor characters on the show. He first appeared in the movie How I Spent My Vacation. He is a young, gray-and-white opossum with blue overalls, a brown-and-red hat, and a banjo. He lives in the swamps and backwoods with his kinfolk, who, unlike himself, tend to capture and prey on innocent travelers who wind up wandering into their territory. It is further confirmed in the "ACME Cable TV" episode that Banjo's family members are inbred and carnivorous with one of his larger relatives proving the latter by devouring Montana Max alive and whole offscreen in the show "Possum Swamp Pauper". Though Max escapes the possum's stomach during the closing theme shortly after and is chased by Banjo's family again. He silently bonds with Buster over the way he can play his banjo in a similar way to how he (Buster) can play his own face and through this friendship, he later rescues him, Babs, and Byron from a mob of predators (that includes some members of his own family, the alligator daughters who want to marry Buster and their father, and other showboat patrons) pursuing them late in the movie. Because of his friendship with them, he ultimately decides to enroll at Acme Looniversity at the end of the movie to get some "edumacation" and spend more time with them. Since his debut, he makes other appearances, both speaking and voiceless.

Banjo is roughly based on the character Lonnie from the movie Deliverance.

=== Witch Sandy ===
Witch Sandy (voiced by Sally Struthers) is a witch based on Witch Hazel, and had a one-time appearance on the show in a parody of Hansel and Gretel. She lived in a house made out of carrot cake and drew the attention of Buster and Babs. She tried to use the two in a recipe like Hazel, turning Babs into a non-anthropomorphic white rabbit and summoning her cutlery to try and kill Buster, but she got turned into a goldfish. Sandy wears a cute disguise, but she is actually as hideous-looking as a witch.

=== Mitzi Avery ===
Mitzi Avery (voiced by Tress MacNeille) is a tall blonde human lady who is based on Red Hot Riding Hood from Tex Avery's Metro-Goldwyn-Mayer animated shorts. She is one of Dizzy Devil's close female friends, who was also his date for the Acme Looniversity Junior Prom in the episode "Prom-ise Her Anything". She also works as a drive-thru waitress as shown in How I Spent My Vacation.

=== Saul Sheepdog ===
Saul Sheepdog is a blueish-gray sheepdog puppy based on Sam Sheepdog. He is a silent character, and makes cameo appearances in a few episodes such as "The Acme Bowl" and the short Duck Trek (a parody of Star Trek) from the episode "Cinemaniacs".

=== Chewcudda ===
Chewcudda (vocal effects provided by Frank Welker) is a bull and a minor character in the original series. He only appeared in one episode, "A Quack in the Quarks", a parody of Star Wars Episode IV – A New Hope. Chewcudda was a parody of Chewbacca, except he is a bull and not a wookiee like Chewbacca. He is based on the Looney Tunes character Toro the bull from Bully for Bugs.

Chewcudda goes along for the ride with Plucky and Frank and Ollie (two young alien ducklings who came to Earth seeking a savior, but instead found Plucky), as they set off to try and take down Duck Vader (a parody of Darth Vader) and his versions of the stormtroopers (with armor shaped in the form of a duck). Plucky mistakes him for a bean bag at first and sits on him, but Chewcudda reveals himself and yells at Plucky. Plucky sticks out his tongue at the large bull, and this makes Chewcudda furious. He charges into him. Chewcudda charges into anything (or anyone) when he sees the color red, as Ollie states, "It's the bull in him."

Later, he is captured by the stormtroopers and his feet are tied up together by rope. He chews on grass (hence the pun "Chew" in his name) and spits it at a couple of the stormtroopers, knocking them over. When Frank throws a bottle of ketchup at Duck Vader, it busts and covers him in it, causing Chewcudda to break free from his rope and charge into Vader, sending him across the room and knocking him unconscious.

=== The Wackyland Rubber Band ===
The Wackyland Rubber Band is what the name implies, a band of anthropomorphic rubber bands that are residents of Wackyland. Capable of shaping themselves into various instruments from drums to horns, this lively quartet can play almost anything and is usually featured in large or important events, such as the halftime show of the football game in "The Acme Bowl" or the source of the music at the junior prom in "Prom-ise Her Anything".

They first appeared in the Looney Tunes series in Porky in Wackyland (1938) and its color remake Dough for the Do-Do (1949). They also appeared Tin Pan Alley Cats (1943).

=== Lightning Rodriguez ===
Lightning Rodriguez is a mouse character who, according to Tom Ruegger, was conceived as a Tiny Toon counterpart to Speedy Gonzales. However, it was feared that he would be deemed an ethnic stereotype, as the Speedy Gonzales shorts had already become controversial for their portrayal of Mexico. The staff additionally felt that a younger Speedy was a low priority due to the addition of a fast character in Little Beeper.

Rodriguez had two background appearances in the show. In "The Acme Bowl", he is seen singing with the other 'Tiny Toons' around a campfire at night before playing against Perfecto Prep. In "You Asked For It", Plucky displays a machine that shows which character the fans want to see and Rodriguez is one of the characters that pass by on the machine's screen.

=== Lady May ===
Lady May (voiced by April Winchell) is a pink female pig based on Petunia Pig. She only appeared at the beginning of "Buster and Babs Go Hawaiian", where Hamton stars in his own segment "Fleche de Lard" (meaning "arrow of lard"). When they are about to kiss, Buster and Babs interrupt the segment. Lady May ends up kissing Plucky.

In the segment itself, villainous wild boar Lord Sebastian tells Lady May (the damsel in distress) that he plans to take her as his wife. Then "Sir Hamton the Prudent" comes to the rescue, challenging the villain to a sword duel. Hamton calls for Plucky as Knave Pluck to give him his sword. He battles Lord Sebastian, defeats him, and chases him away. Hamton thus saves Lady May. She and Hamton are about to kiss, only to be interrupted by Buster and Babs, who complain about not being in the cartoon. She is last seen in the background, kissing Plucky while Hamton tells them that this cartoon was his vehicle to stardom.

=== Private Eye ===
Private Eye is an anthropomorphic eyeball from Wackyland.

=== Egghead Jr. ===
Egghead Jr. is a one-shot character who greatly resembles Elmer Fudd (who himself had evolved from an earlier character named Egghead). In "Plucky's Dastardly Deed", he is "the smartest kid in class", whom Plucky aims to swap tests with. After being overcome with guilt in a nightmare, Plucky planned to admit that he cheated by swapping his paper with Egghead Jr. only for his teacher Foghorn Leghorn to silence him and mention that all the tests have fallen into a mud puddle causing all the tests to be redone.

Egghead Jr. is based on the obscure Looney Tunes character Egghead. The former's head is a bit larger and his nose is smaller. The latter was never officially seen on Tiny Toon Adventures.

Egghead Jr. also appears in "Hog Wild Hamton", but this time is redrawn as the actual Egghead Jr., a genius baby chick from the Foghorn Leghorn series.

=== Johnny Pew ===
Johnny Pew (voiced by Rob Paulsen) is a movie star blue skunk who only appears in Tiny Toon Adventures: How I Spent My Vacation who Fifi has a crush before he hits on another skunk.

=== Bimbette Skunk ===
Bimbette Skunk (voiced by Kath Soucie) is an anthropomorphic pink female skunk who only appears in Tiny Toon Adventures: How I Spent My Vacation who Johnny Pew hits on.

=== Julie Bruin ===
Julie Bruin (voiced by Julie Brown) is an attractive anthropomorphic female bear and a caricature/parody of her voice actress Julie Brown, who appears in the episode "Tiny Toon Music Television" in a segment called Just Say Julie Bruin, which is a parody of Brown's MTV Music Video show Just Say Julie.

She first appears after the opening credits of her sketch, where she is laying down what seems to be a version of Twister. She then tells the viewers that she's having a 1960s-style tango party with Buster and Babs, who said they invited Madonna to her party. When Buster and Babs arrive, they seem to be alone. Buster and Babs tell her that they did not say Madonna but Fuddonna (Elmer Fudd in disguise).

Julie puts on a music video starring Montana Max singing "Money (That's What I Want)". She later makes a non-speaking appearance in the same music video on Monty's cruise ship, where he tosses her into the ocean. He throws a lifesaver for her to float on, but it hits her on the head instead.

== Other antagonists ==
=== Gotcha Grabmore ===
Gotcha Grabmore (voiced by Joan Gerber) is an evil businesswoman who kills wild animals to make cosmetics and other stuff. She only makes two appearances in "Raining Daze" where she tries to kill a seal. She later returned in "Whale's Tales" where she tries to kill some whales.

Gotcha first appears in the segment "Fur-Gone Conclusion" as the main antagonist. When Buster and Babs take a wrong turn on their way to Aruba and end up in Antarctica, Babs gets frozen in a block of ice and is defrosted by a baby seal. Gotcha captures the baby seal and attempts to skin it, so Babs and Buster disguise themselves as the Vanderbunnys in an attempt to save it.

Gotcha returns in the episode "Whale's Tales" again as the main antagonist. She builds a new cosmetics factory and teams up with a crew of octopus pirates, led by Octavius. Together, they capture a mother whale, leaving her baby in the hands of Elmyra Duff. Buster and Babs rescue the baby whale and he takes them to Gotcha's factory. Gotcha plans to kill the mother whale to use her blubber for her cosmetics. She even threatens to kill the baby to "make baby oil".

Gotcha makes a cameo appearance in the "A Cat's Eye View" episode segment "Party Crasher Plucky" where she is one of the celebrities seen attending Shirley MacLaine's party.

=== Dr. Gene Splicer ===
Dr. Gene Splicer (voiced by Jeff Altman) is a mad scientist who does crazy things to animals as seen in "Hair-Raising Night" and had been kicked out of his science community for these experiments. Bugs sends Buster and his friends to his lair to thwart Dr. Splicer's plot. This ended in a conflict where he is sent into his own formula. Dr. Splicer popped up at the award show where his body has been turned into a chicken's body.

A human again Dr. Gene Splicer made a movie theater cameo in "How I Spent My Vacation" and appeared in "The Return of Batduck" among the villains that are about to attack the Michael Keaton depiction of Batman before Tim Burton sends stunt actor Plucky Duck in.

He later appeared in Tiny Toons Adventures for the NES, Buster Busts Loose for the SNES and Buster's Hidden Treasure for the Genesis.

=== Mr. Hitcher ===
Mr. Hitcher (voiced by Rob Paulsen) is a psychotic killer with a hockey mask and chainsaw that Hampton's family and Plucky encounter during their road trip. He attempts to use his chainsaw on Plucky and Hampton and later tries to attack Buster and Babs.

In "Going Up", a baby Plucky encounters Mr. Hitcher at the Acme Mall at the time when Plucky was messing with the elevators.

In "The Return of Batduck", Mr. Hitcher is among the villains that are about to attack the Michael Keaton depiction of Batman before Tim Burton sends stunt actor Plucky Duck in.

Mr. Hitcher is modeled after known fictional serial killers Jason Voorhees and Leatherface.

=== Sappy Stanley ===
Sappy Stanley (voiced by Jonathan Winters) is a green elephant who is very jealous of Bugs Bunny. He has made only one appearance in "Who Bopped Bugs Bunny?", which is a parody of Who Framed Roger Rabbit?. Sappy Stanley is a parody of Terrytoons character Sidney the Elephant a.k.a. Silly Sidney. Sidney was created by Gene Deitch.

As a baby, Stanley discovered he had the ability to make others laugh when chimpanzees threw coconuts at his head and laughed at him. Throughout the 1950s, Stanley starred in many classic cartoons. His best cartoon was "Which Way to the Arctic?", which involved him getting hit by coconut-throwing chimpanzees. The film was nominated for the Hollywood Shloscar (a parody of the Oscars), but lost to Knighty Knight Bugs (1958). Outraged, Stanley moved to Paris where he became a national star, but slowly began building up his revenge against Bugs Bunny.

The historical background to the episode was the nomination of Silly Sidney's second short, called "Sidney's Family Tree" (1958), for an Academy Award for Best Animated Short Film. It lost to Knighty Knight Bugs.

=== The Wolverine ===
The Wolverine (vocal effects provided by Frank Welker) is an evil wolverine who tries to eat the Tiny Toons. He is first introduced in "Buster and the Wolverine" (a spoof of Peter and the Wolf), and makes cameos in various other cartoons. In his debut appearance, he manages to kidnap Hamton, Plucky, Babs, Sweetie, and Furrball, and he is successful in devouring them all. However, they are later rescued by Buster, and they all work together to defeat him. In the same episode, he also makes a brief attempt at devouring Montana Max, Shirley, and Gogo.

=== The Coyote Kid ===
The Coyote Kid (voiced by Frank Welker) is a brown coyote who is an outlaw and is the main antagonist of "High Toon". He bears a close resemblance to Wile E. Coyote, but is not to be confused with him.

== Sources ==
- Lenburg, Jeff (2006), "Bartsch, Art", Who's who in Animated Cartoons: An International Guide to Film & Television's Award-winning and Legendary Animators, Hal Leonard Corporation, ISBN 978-1557836717
