= Tiger Telematics =

Swedish electronic company

- Founded: 2000; 26 years ago (as Eagle Eye Scandinavian); Sweden
- Defunct: February 2006
- Fate: Bankrupt
- Headquarters: Jacksonville, Florida, U.S.

Tiger Telematics, or Tiger, was a Swedish-American electronics company, best known for the failed Gizmondo handheld game console.

== History ==
In 2000, Carl Freer formed Eagle Eye Scandinavian, a small electronics distribution business in Sweden. In 2002 the company merged with Floor Décor, a carpet retailer based in Jacksonville, Florida. Once that was completed, Floor Décor's Michael Carrender became the company's chief financial officer.

The merged company soon renamed itself Tiger Telematics Inc. with a new ticker symbol "TIGR". It made an attempt to take on Sony and Nintendo in the UK gaming market and relocated at an office near Farnborough Airfield. Stefan Eriksson, whom Freer had met during a previous business visit, was brought into the company with Peter Uf and Johan Enander.

=== Gizmondo launch ===
The Gizmondo device made its debut as a concept product at the German CeBIT show in March 2004, when its European subsidiary was then known as Gametrac Europe before renaming itself as Gizmondo Europe.

The company became known for its extravagant spending, despite not yet making a profit, let alone getting the Gizmondo off the ground. It counts amongst its exploits buying out model agency ISIS, and leasing a shop on Regent Street in London as its flagship showroom at a cost of £175,000 per annum. Despite the losses, Tiger Telematics gained continuing funding, including $73.1 million worth of investment capital during 2005, and it issued some 24.7 million shares which brought in over $200 million.

The showroom also ran a launch party at the Park Lane Hotel and its own store, sparing no expense. The party was hosted by Dannii Minogue and Tom Green, with performances by Sting, Pharrell, Busta Rhymes and Jamiroquai. Sting was rumored to be paid £750,000 for the performance. In an attempt to promote the product, Eriksson competed at the 24 hours of Le Mans in the Gizmondo-sponsored Ferrari 360 Modena GTC in 2005, but retired in the morning with mechanical troubles.

In August 2004, the company announced it was buying Swedish games developer Indie Studios, which had already agreed to create two titles for the handheld.

== Organised crime links ==
In October 2005, shortly after Gizmondo was released in America, a Swedish yellow-page paper printed a story linking Stefan Eriksson and two other Swedish Gizmondo Europe executives to the Swedish crime ring "Uppsalamaffian" (Uppsala Mafia). The paper investigated a 6-month loss of 200 million dollars, exhibiting large payouts to later bankrupt entities. Further, the trio's felonious history was revealed, such as Eriksson's 10-year prison sentences in 1993/94, for, among other things, conspiracy to pass counterfeit currency and attempted fraud, and the fact that Johan Enander was wanted by the Swedish police. In light of these findings, Eriksson and others resigned. One of those resignations came from Carl Freer, the chairman of the board and a director who, with Eriksson, co-owned Northern Lights Software Limited. Freer had previously sold luxury cars in France, Germany and the U.K., some of which turned out to have been stolen. Northern Lights was paid $3.5 million to create Chicane (a Formula One racing game being developed exclusively for Gizmondo) and Colors (an urban gang warfare first-person perspective shooter), two Gizmondo games that were actually developed by Gizmondo Europe itself. Freer paid the money back to Gizmondo in order to stop an investigation into the matter. The Gizmondo company itself denied knowing anything about Eriksson's past.

In addition, Gizmondo paid $4 million to Games Factory Publishing for nineteen concept games on the handheld, including a game called Typing Tutor, despite having no keyboard peripheral, and $5.9 million to Electronic Arts to port its SSX and FIFA games.

Around March 2005, US-based Tiger Telematics bought UK stock market-listed games developer Warthog for almost 500,000 Tiger shares and $1.13 million in cash—altogether worth $8.1 million. Acquiring all of Warthog's operating subsidiaries, along with the group's debts, and Warthog's CEO, Ashley Hall, COO Steven Law and CFO Simon Elms, to become Tiger employees. Warthog's team also has close ties with key games publishers and game franchise owners.

== Bankruptcy ==
On January 23, 2006, the UK based arm, Gizmondo Europe (GE) declared bankruptcy. Gizmondo hemorrhaged hundreds of millions of dollars before filing for bankruptcy: in 2004, Tiger Telematics reported a loss of $99.29 million, and between January and September 2005, they lost $210 million, "Principally due to development costs for the Gizmondo and non-cash expenses associated with shares of restricted common stock issued for services". In other words, it had bartered shares in lieu of cash payments. Soon after Gizmondo retail locations in both the US and the UK closed, and the Gizmondo website was shut down. The game development arm of Gizmondo also went out of business.

The company was also involved in litigation. Swedish Ogilvy Group, MTV Europe, Christian and Timbers (landlord to their office), Handheld Gaming and Jordan Grand Prix all filed million dollar lawsuits against the company. Gizmondo was also currently under investigation in the UK for approximately £25-30 million owed to HM Revenue and Customs.

In early February 2006, the High Court appointed two liquidators. David Rubin & Partners was to deal with the sale of the company's assets, thought to amount to little more than the furniture in its Regent Street showroom and Begbies Traynor was asked to investigate exactly where Gizmondo's money had gone. The 27 staff remaining at Gizmondo's head office in Farnborough and five at its London store were made redundant. No Gizmondo accounts for 2005 have been published, but internal figures show sales of just £1.4m in the first nine months of the year. Losses were equivalent to £500,000 a day. Directors' salaries amounted to £6.6m for the nine months. Leasing cars cost £2m-plus.

The console was deemed the worst console of all time by GameTrailers because they claimed it drove Tiger into bankruptcy.

== Carl Freer buys intellectual property assets ==
In November 2007, Carl Freer stated in an interview with the Swedish-American journalist Hans Sandberg that he was interested in starting up production of the Gizmondo again. In April 2008, a press release was issued that an agreement had been reached between the joint liquidators of Gizmondo Europe Ltd in Liquidation and one of the company's ex-Directors, Carl Freer. The press release originated as a low quality copy of a letter purported to be from one of the accounting firms handling the insolvency, posted to a file sharing site. According to Mr Freer, “the shareholders of Tiger Telematics will now be able to prosper on the re-introduction of the Gizmondo into the market."

The new system never appeared. The original planned launch date was May 2008, but this was quickly pushed back to November 2008, along with details of a new company, Media Power, behind the launch, headed by Carl Freer and his Swedish partner Mikael Ljungman, with development apparently proceeding according to the new schedule at least until September. By December 2008, the console had still not appeared, and another announcement was made about a complete redesign as a Windows CE or Google Android powered smart phone.

Since then, the Media Power website has gone offline and co-founder Mikael Ljungman has been arrested and convicted of serious fraud.
