= Sticky Balls =

2005 video game

- Developer: Gizmondo Studios Manchester
- Publisher: Gizmondo Studios
- Designer: John Pickford; Ste Pickford
- Platforms: Gizmondo, iOS
- Release: Gizmondo: EU: May 24, 2005; NA: October 22, 2005; iOS; May 23, 2014
- Genre: Puzzle
- Modes: Single-player, multiplayer

Sticky Balls is a 2005 puzzle video game developed by Gizmondo Studios in Manchester and released on the Gizmondo handheld system. The game was originally designed by Ste and John Pickford and was developed for various platforms, but at the end only the Gizmondo version materialized, and the Pickford brothers had no involvement in this version. Sticky Balls was ported to iOS in 2014.

== Gameplay ==
Screenshot of gameplay on a Gizmondo.

Sticky Balls uses a pool-like interface where the player utilizes a spring-loaded rod to shoot brightly colored balls at each other. Bouncing the balls against the table walls doubles the score of the shot but hitting a ball of a different color, or failing to hit anything causes the player to lose a turn.

Rather than pocketing the balls in a pocket like in a traditional pool game, the balls must be stuck together in groups of seven to win the stage. As the game progresses, additional power-ups, bonuses and stage designs offer new challenges.

== Development and release ==
It was initially developed by Zed Two for Pocket PCs. After Zed Two was bought out by Warthog, a version was in development for the PlayStation Portable, until Warthog was bought out by Tiger Telematics and development was switched to the Gizmondo, eventually releasing on May 24, 2005. It became the most popular game on the Gizmondo platform.

Sony Computer Entertainment Europe expressed interest in publishing a version for the PlayStation Portable, and although development on a PSP version began, the release failed to materialize before Zed Two's closure.

On May 23, 2014, Fast Pixel Games Ltd released Sticky Balls on iOS devices under the name Sticky Balls Classic. It was popular enough to spawn a sequel, Sticky Balls Soccer, released on June 29, 2014.

Four versions of Sticky Balls ultimately existed before the title was initially commercially released. Two distinct versions, one for Pocket PCs and one for personal computers, although both completed, never released, while a third for PlayStation Portable was cancelled. The fourth version for Gizmondo was the one ultimately released, although the Pickford Brothers were not involved in the Gizmondo version as Zed Two had been sold to Warthog prior to the decision to develop a Gizmondo version being made. The decision to implement the 'golf-like gameplay' was made after the Pickford Brothers left development.
