= Gizmondo =

Handheld game console (2005–2006)

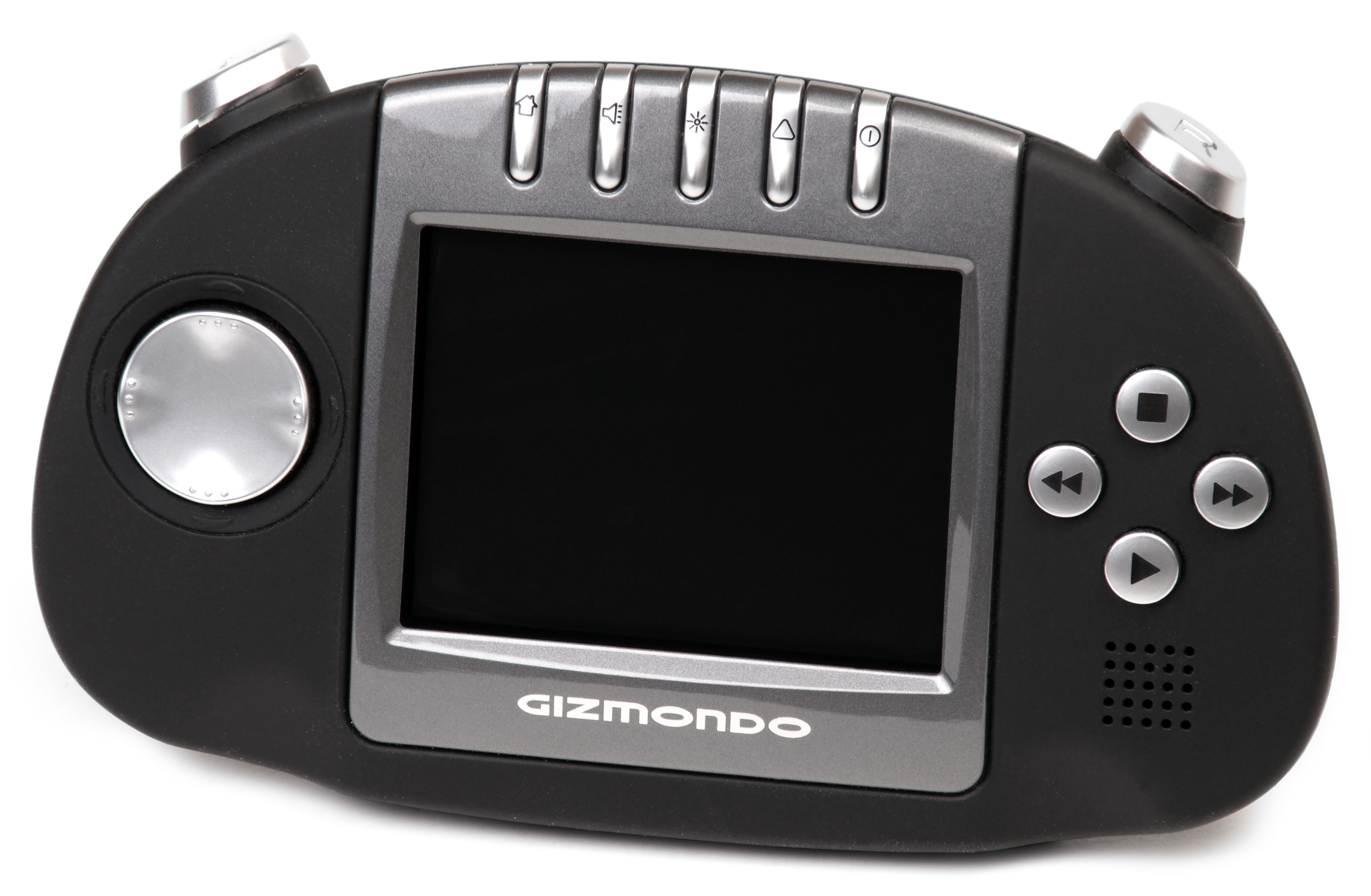
- Manufacturer: Tiger Telematics
- Type: Handheld game console
- Generation: Seventh
- Released: 19 March 2005
- Discontinued: 6 February 2006
- Units sold: est. < 25,000
- Media: SD, MMC
- Operating system: Windows CE
- CPU: ARM9 S3C2440 @ 400 MHz
- Display: 2.8 inches (7.1 cm) TFT LCD
- Connectivity: Bluetooth, GPRS, GPS
- Best-selling game: Sticky Balls

The Gizmondo is a handheld gaming console developed by Gizmondo Europe. Its development was led by Swedish entrepreneur Carl Freer, who served as chairman of its parent company, Tiger Telematics. The device was originally launched on 19 March 2005 in Britain; although releases in other European territories were planned for 19 May, this never occurred, and it instead only received a limited release in Sweden. It also had a limited release in the United States in October 2005. The Gizmondo was produced and marketed until 2006 when Gizmondo Europe was liquidated.

Powered by an ARM9 processor, the Gizmondo had the usual features seen in handheld consoles of the time (Nintendo DS, N-Gage) but notably also included a digital camera and a built-in GPS chip. Additionally, it also had mobile cellular connectivity, giving the ability to send SMS text messages and MMS picture messages (although no telephone capabilities), as well as browse WAP webpages and email using its GPRS connection. Software-wise, the Gizmondo runs on Windows CE. First-party game studios were located in Sweden and England to develop video games for the system.

In an attempt to promote the product's launch, Gizmondo Europe extravagantly spent millions on promotions such as a celebrity party at London's Park Lane Hotel, and taking part at the 24 Hours of Le Mans, despite never making a profit. Despite a degree of market expectation it ended up as a major sales failure; this was further worsened by a delay in its American release and the announcement of a widescreen version shortly before debuting there. The company was further overshadowed by Swedish press reports of criminal pasts of its executives, including Gizmondo Europe's director Stefan Eriksson's past as an organised crime figure.

== Developmental and corporate history ==
The Gizmondo was conceived by Carl Freer, chairman of Florida-based Tiger Telematics, Inc. Originally the plan was for a GPS child-tracking device before the idea turned into a game system. The device was originally called Gametraq. Tiger Telematics first published on their website in October 2003 about the device being developed. This came in response to Nokia's N-Gage. During December that year, Gizmondo made its debut as a concept product at the Las Vegas CES in January 2004, and later appeared at the German CeBIT show in March 2004. The company and the console were renamed Gizmondo around April 2004, and made an appearance under this name at E3 2004. The exterior design was designed by Rick Dickinson.

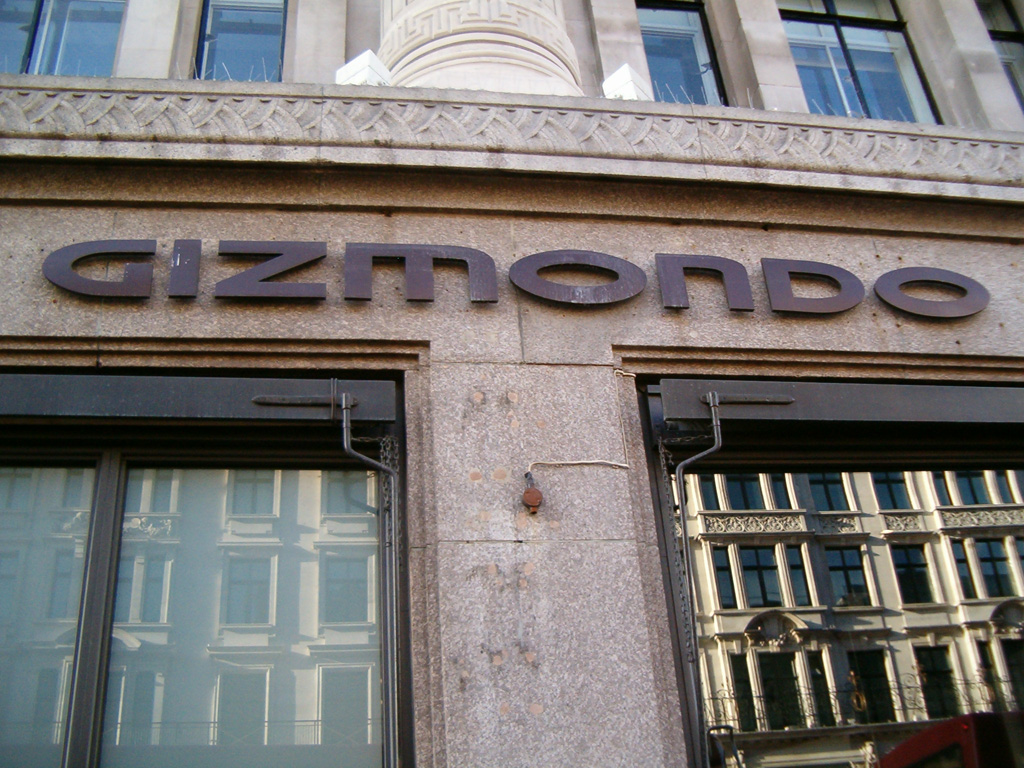
The former Gizmondo store in Regent Street, London

London-based Gizmondo Europe Ltd. was formed and became the arm responsible for the game system. British Formula One driver Jenson Button appeared on magazine adverts for the Gizmondo, and also had his own licensed video game for the device, Chicane, though it never released due to a dispute with Tiger Telematics and the developer of the game. In London's Regent Street, Tiger Telematics threw a party with several celebrities invited to promote the device at the time of the March 2005 release. Busta Rhymes, Jodie Kidd and Pharrell Williams were among the celebrities invited, of whom some performed. There were also two television adverts that aired after release. Also, in an attempt to promote the console, Gizmondo's executive Stefan Eriksson took part in the 24 Hours of Le Mans race of 2005 in a Gizmondo-sponsored Ferrari 360 Modena GTC. Overall, the Gizmondo had attracted much media attention and hype in Britain even before it was released.

=== Announcement of widescreen Gizmondo ===
In September 2005, Tiger Telematics confirmed a redesigned Gizmondo model for release in 2006. It was intended to have a larger, 4" widescreen screen and upgrades like Wi-Fi, TV-out support, an improved 480 × 272 pixel resolution, a 2-megapixel camera, and a 500 MHz processor. It also included tri-band GSM technology with voice telephony, effectively making it a mobile phone too. It also featured new icons on the buttons. Carl Freer stated at the time of announcement that development of the revision was complete.

The widescreen Gizmondo was announced just a few weeks before the U.S. launch of the Gizmondo, possibly prompting some potential customers to not buy the Gizmondo, and instead wait for the improved model, in an example of the Osborne effect. Tiger Telematics promised to show the device at CES 2006 in January; however, it never appeared there. Shortly thereafter, Gizmondo Europe went bust and thus the new Gizmondo was never released.

=== Downfall and aftermath ===
The Gizmondo was further overshadowed when, in October 2005, Sweden's Aftonbladet revealed criminal pasts of several executives, causing their resignations including Tiger Telematics CEO Carl Freer. Gizmondo Europe's head Stefan Eriksson was involved in a Swedish criminal organisation, the "Uppsalamaffian" (the Uppsala mafia), while his fellow mafia friends Johan Enander and Peter Uf, both at key positions at the company, had spent time in prison for either fraud, grand theft or extortion. This occurred shortly before Gizmondo's American launch and by this time both Freer and Eriksson had moved to the United States, residing in Bel Air, Los Angeles.

In January 2006, Gizmondo Europe went into administration (a British legal term similar to filing for bankruptcy) despite a loan from its parent Tiger Telematics, putting the system's future into doubt. Failing to recover, the company was liquidated in February 2006 after amassing US$300 million (£160 million) debt, and the Gizmondo stopped production. Its UK and Sweden based development studios were also liquidated. Liquidators also reported that they couldn't explain where "as much as half" of sustained net losses by Tiger Telematics (close to US$400 million) had gone to.

Weeks thereafter Eriksson crashed a rare Ferrari Enzo driving at 260 km/h (162 mph) in California, and was later jailed and subsequently deported for driving under the influence in connection with the crash and other criminal offenses. He pleaded guilty to numerous criminal charges which led him to 2 years in jail.

Although U.S. sales figures were not officially released, the GamePro website cited less than 25,000 units overall (without further clarifications) and called it the worst selling handheld console in history. In 2007, GameTrailers named it "the worst console of all time."

== Release and lifetime ==
Gizmondo soft-launched on 29 October 2004 following TV teaser commercials in Europe and the opening of global preorders. Gizmondo was released in the United Kingdom on 19 March 2005, priced at £229, along with a remake of the racing game Trailblazer. It was available from the Gizmondo flagship store on London's Regent Street, via Gizmondo's online shop, and other high-street and online retailers such as Argos, Dixons, Currys, John Lewis, although it was never clear how many units were actually introduced into those retail channels. The SMS service of the Gizmondo enabled people to send messages by pre-pay SIM cards from Vodafone bundled in with the device. The Gizmondo sold 1000 units within an hour of launch. In April, a month after the initial release, a variant of the console with GPS-assisted "Smart Adds" [sic] advertising enabled was released with an RRP of £129.

The company said that it would roll out to the rest of Europe starting from 19 May 2005, including Germany, France, Italy, Spain and Nordic countries. Its stated price in Germany was 349 euros, or 189 euros for the Smart Adds version. Confirmed retailers for distribution include Virgin Megastores in France and Karstadt in Germany. However, this date passed by without it being released for undisclosed reasons. Gizmondo only received a limited release that year in Sweden, launching with both Smart Adds and normal units available, and rather than opening flagship stores Gizmondo Europe relied on established retailers such as Webhallen.

By September 2005 the device had still not been released in Europe outside of Britain and Sweden. A French gaming journalist reported that staff at the London flagship store claimed a French release by Christmas, writing in December 2005 that this looked like it wasn't going ahead. The journalist claimed that contacts stated to him that European stocks of the Gizmondo were instead used to supply the American release.

=== United States ===
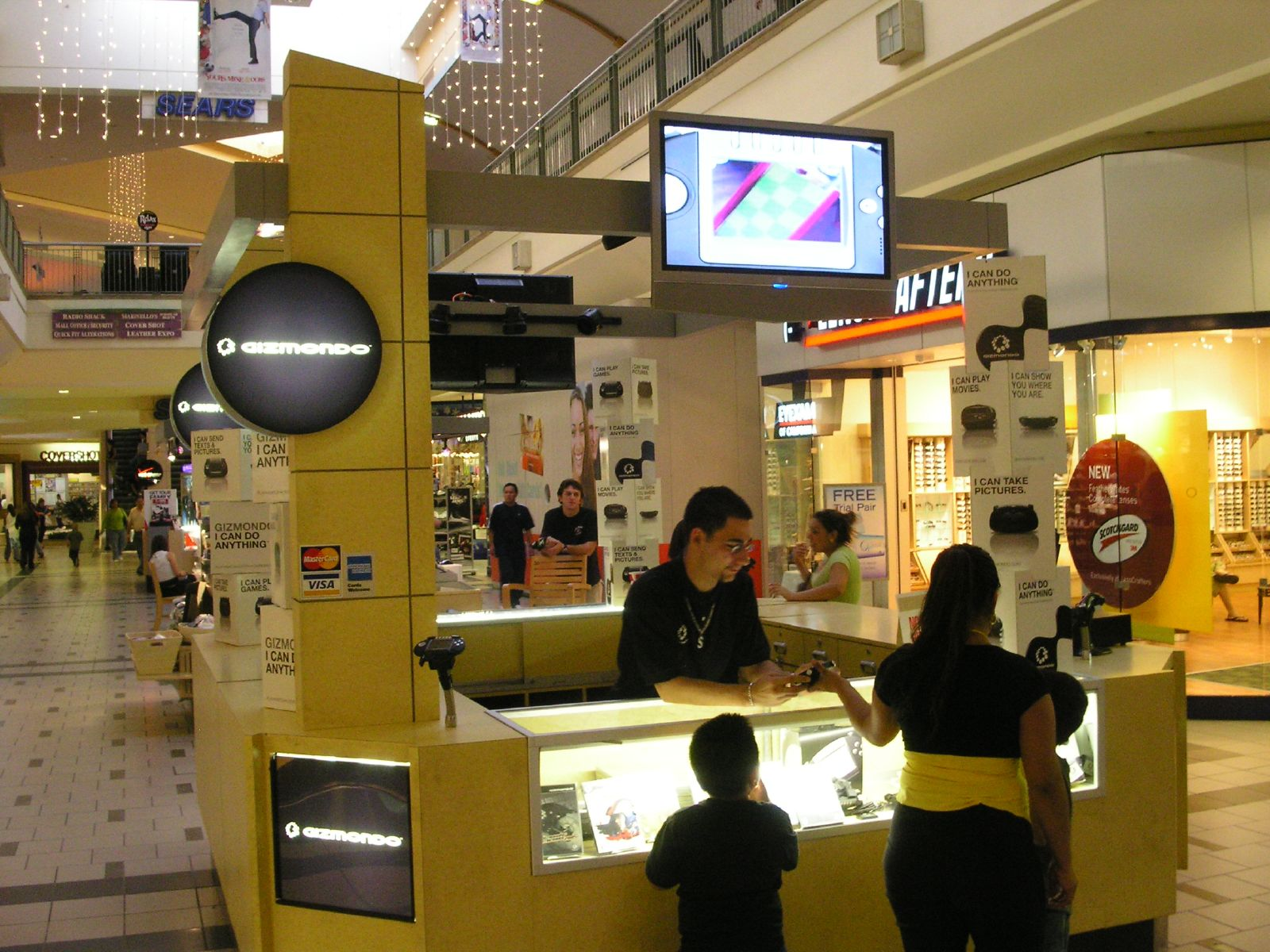
A booth selling Gizmondos in West Covina, California, November 2005

In the United States, the Gizmondo launched much later, on October 22, 2005, with a line-up of eight titles, including Trailblazer. Retail price was $400 for a unit without "Smart Ads", or $229 for a "Smart Ads" enabled device. It was available only at kiosks located in shopping malls throughout the U.S. (operated by National Kiosk, LLC, located in the western corner of North Carolina). Only 8 of the planned 14 games were ever released in the U.S., along with no CoPilot GPS software, though the software was sold on the British site for a week or two. There was little to no advertising, and some of their advertising was even put in magazines of Nintendo Power (Nintendo's official magazine). Plans to distribute the handheld through other retailers never materialized.

=== Smart Adds version ===
The "Smart Adds" system was intended as a way for advertisers to subsidize part of the cost of the unit. The apparent misspelling of the name was intentional and a trademark and company name were registered in the UK as "Smart Adds", though even Tiger Telematics occasionally referred to it as "Smart Ads" in their publicity material. A "Smart Adds"-enabled Gizmondo was cheaper (£129/$229), but would display fullscreen advertisements at random intervals when the user entered the home screen.

These advertisements were to be downloaded via the device's GPRS data connection, and would have been targeted based on data inputted to the device. The advertising service was never actually launched, resulting in customers who opted for this version essentially receiving the premium product at a reduced cost. Gizmondo intended that a maximum of three ads would be shown per day. Some ads would include special offers in the form of vouchers or barcodes, and some would utilize the device's GPS system to direct users to the nearest store carrying the advertised product.

== Game library ==
In addition to 14 games, a further 30 titles were known to have been in development for the system but all were canceled before their release due to Gizmondo Europe's bankruptcy. Also all games released in North America were effectively launch titles. There was also one non-game software, Gizmondo Navigator CoPilot 2006, a satellite navigation software using the device's GPS.

Certain games were claimed to be capable of using "augmented reality", most notably the unreleased game Colors. It was intended to be the first GPS video game, with the ability to track a user's real world movements in real time. Additionally several games including Gizmondo Motocross 2005, Hockey Rage 2005, and Sticky Balls had Bluetooth multiplayer features.

Video games and other software released for the Gizmondo, by publisher, release location, and year
Title(s)	Developer	Publisher	NA release	EU release
Classic Compendium	AI Factory	Gizmondo Games	October 22, 2005	August 9, 2005
Classic Compendium 2	AI Factory	Gizmondo Games	October 22, 2005	October 14, 2005
Fathammer Classics Pack	Fathammer/Ninai Games/Vasara Games	Gizmondo Games	N/A	March 19, 2005
FIFA 2005	Exient Entertainment/Electronic Arts Canada	Gizmondo Games	N/A	September 15, 2005
Gizmondo Motocross 2005	Housemarque	Fathammer	October 22, 2005	April 20, 2005
Gizmondo Navigator CoPilot 2006	ALK Technologies Ltd.	Gizmondo Games	N/A	2006
Hockey Rage 2005	Chairman & Board	Fathammer	N/A	April 26, 2005
Interstellar Flames 2	Xen Games	Gizmondo Games	N/A	September 30, 2005
Pocket Ping Pong 2005	Netdol	Fathammer	N/A	May 18, 2005
Point of Destruction	Gizmondo Studios Manchester	Gizmondo Games	October 22, 2005	August 5, 2005
Richard Burns Rally	Gizmondo Studios Manchester	Gizmondo Eur Ltd	October 22, 2005	July 11, 2005
SSX 3	Exient Entertainment/Electronic Arts	Gizmondo Games	N/A	August 31, 2005
Sticky Balls	Gizmondo Studios Manchester	Gizmondo Games	October 22, 2005	May 24, 2005
Toy Golf	Ninai Games	Fathammer	October 22, 2005	May 4, 2005
Trailblazer	Gizmondo Studios Manchester	Gizmondo Games	October 22, 2005	March 19, 2005

Cancelled games
Title	Developer	Reference
Agaju: The Sacred Path of Treasure	Gizmondo Studios	
Age of Empires	Microsoft Game Studios	
Alien Hominid	Tuna	
Ball Busters	Gizmondo Studios	
Battlestations: Midway	SCi Games	
Carmageddon	SCi Games	
Casino	Hustler	
Catapult		
Chicane: Jenson Button Street Racing	Gizmondo Studios	
City	Gizmondo Studios	
Colors	Gizmondo Studios	
Conflict: Desert Storm II	SCi Games	
Conflict: Vietnam	SCi Games	
Fallen Kingdoms	Warthog Games	
Furious Phil	Gizmondo Studios	
Future Tactics: The Uprising	Gizmondo Studios	
Ghost	Gizmondo Studios	
Goal	Factory 1	
Hit & Myth	Gizmondo Studios	
It's Mr. Pants	Microsoft Game Studios	
Johnny Whatever	Warthog Games	
Jump	Gizmondo Studios	
MechAssault	Microsoft Game Studios	
Milo and the Rainbow Nasties	Gizmondo Studios	
Momma Can I Mow The Lawn	Warthog Games	
Race	Gizmondo Studios	
Rayman	Ubisoft	
Sega Classics Pack	Sega	
SpeedGun Stadium	Gizmondo Studios	
Supernaturals	Gizmondo Studios	
The Great Escape	SCi Games	
TRON 2.0	Gizmondo Studios	
Verbier Ride	JoWood	
Virtual Squash	Fathammer	
Worms World Party	Team 17	

Gizmondo main menu screen running on low battery

== Technical specifications ==
- Display: 72 mm (2.8 inch) TFT screen
- Resolution: 320 × 240 pixels
- CPU: Samsung S3C2440 ARM9 processor running at 400 MHz
- Graphics: Nvidia GoForce 3D 4500
- Graphics RAM: 1.2 MB 128-bit SRAM
- Graphics Performance: 1,000,000 polygons per second
- RAM: 64 MB 16-bit SDRAM
- ROM: 64 MB
- Sound: Built-in speaker
- Communication: Bluetooth class 2 for multiplayer gaming, GSM tri-band
- Ports: Stereo headset socket, Mini-USB client, SD flash card reader
- Power: Removable battery
- Temperature Range: 32–130 °F (0–54 °C)
- OS: Windows CE
- Multimedia: MPEG 4 video playback, ability to play back MP3, WAV and MIDI files via Windows Media Player 9
- JPEG camera
- Removable SIM card
- GPS tracking application
- GPRS mapping application
- GPRS Class 10
- SMS
- MMS receive and send
- WAP 2.0
- Polyphonic ring tones
- Flight mode

== Successor ==
Former Tiger Telematics chairman Carl Freer announced to a Swedish newspaper in November 2007 his intentions for a new Gizmondo, and said there were already 35 games in place, a manufacturing base in Shenzhen, China, and that he hoped the handheld would retail at US$99.

The original planned launch date was May 2008, but this was quickly pushed back to November 2008, along with details of a new company, Media Power, behind the launch, headed by Carl Freer and his Swedish partner Mikael Ljungman, with development apparently proceeding according to the new schedule at least until September. By December 2008, the console had still not appeared, which Freer blamed on the 2008 financial crisis. The device was delayed to 2009 as a result. The latest design prototype turned it into a smartphone running both Windows CE or Google Android.

However, since then the Media Power website went offline. Co-founder Mikael Ljungman was later arrested, extradited to Denmark and convicted of serious fraud due to his activities at IT Factory. Nothing more has been announced about the device by Freer, effectively confirming its cancellation.

== In popular culture ==
A reference to the Gizmondo is made in the British movie Goal!, when a meeting takes place in a Gizmondo store.
