= San Gabriel Valley Transit Authority =

The San Gabriel Valley Transit Authority (SGVTA) was a small quasi-governmental, public interest corporation operating as a bus transit provider in Los Angeles County, California providing free transport services to seniors, poor and disabled members of the cities of Monrovia and Sierra Madre. The SGVTA entered into a Memoranda of Understanding (MOU) with the two cities. Its equipment consisted primarily of five lift-equipped coaches and a 50 passenger bus. Its paid staff included fewer than a dozen coach and bus drivers.

Two Swedish nationals, Carl Freer and Stefan Eriksson made donations to the SGVTA under its non-profit corporate status. Freer and Eriksson allegedly presented SGVTA business cards to identify themselves as civilian members of the SGVTA's police department following a well publicized car crash involving Eriksson.

== Later developments ==
The SGVTA was notable for having had a transit police force consisting primarily of volunteer commissioners and auxiliaries. Although the SGVTA's "police agency" was not a participating agency in the California Commission on Peace Officer Standards & Training (POST) program, the agency was recognized by POST as an authorized law enforcement agency established in California. Eriksson was a businessman who was found with SGVTA business cards purportedly from its "police agency" after being involved in a high profile traffic accident. During a subsequent court proceeding in Alhambra, California, it was determined that the SGVTA police agency was issued an official ORI number by the California State Department of Justice, and its sworn police officers each possessed Peace Officer Standards in Training (POST) certificates issued by the Rio Hondo Police Academy as well as the Los Angeles County Sheriff's Academy. Therefore, the court determined that the SGVTA's sworn officers met minimum standards as peace officers in the State of California.

Another Swedish national, Carl Freer was also arrested after he allegedly flashed a civilian police commissioner's identification card from SGVTA in order to purchase a gun from a dealer without the required background checks. Los Angeles County sheriff's detectives said they found 12 rifles and four handguns during searches at the Swedish national's home in the Bel-Air community and on his 100-foot yacht docked at Marina del Rey. No charges were ever filed against Freer in connection with that arrest, and each of the rifles and handguns taken during the search of his home were returned.

The SGVTA founder and operator of an auto repair service in Monrovia was briefly detained while trying to recover two of the agency's vehicles which had been impounded as part of the investigation into the "SGVTA Police" by the Los Angeles County Sheriff's Department. Authorities claimed that he had committed perjury in official documents filed with the California Department of Motor Vehicles (DMV), by claiming that the SGVTA was a government entity. Upon presentation of executed MOU's between the cities of Monrovia and Sierra Madre, demonstrating that the SGVTA was operating as a political subdivision of two municipalities, the charge was dropped. No other charges have been filed in connection with the SGVTA's operations, and all vehicles were returned to the SGVTA.

As a result of the negative publicity, SGVTA's services to the impoverished and disabled members of the San Gabriel Valley Community were discontinued as of July 18, 2006.
