= Hockey Rage 2005 =

2005 sports video game

- Developer(s): Chairman & Board
- Publisher(s): Fathammer
- Platform(s): Gizmondo
- Release: EU: April 26, 2005
- Mode(s): Single player, Multiplayer

Hockey Rage 2005 is a hockey game for the Nokia N-Gage and Gizmondo handheld game console. The game features a Bluetooth two player option.

== Development ==
Hockey Rage 2005 was made using publisher Fathammer's X-Forge 2 middleware. It was released as a launch title for the Gizmondo. A Tapwave Zodiac version was also planned but its release was cancelled.

== Reception ==
Eurogamer's Ellie Gibson described the game as "a straightforward Ice Hockey title with simple controls", criticizing how small the sprites are in the game. Electronic Gaming Monthly considered it one of the games worth buying on launch, calling its gameplay "simple fun".
