= Carl Freer =

Swedish businessman

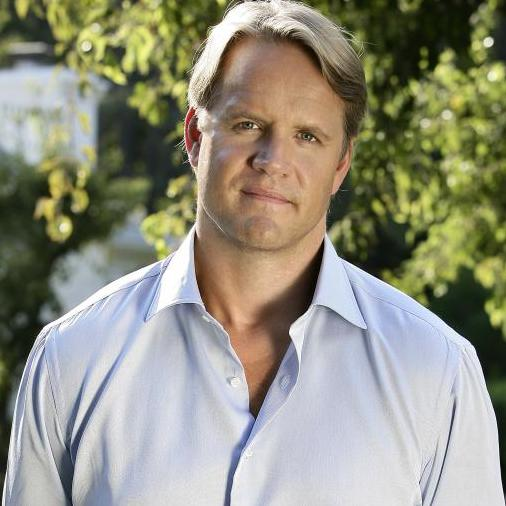
- Freer in February 2012
- Born: Carl Johan Freer
- Occupations: Entrepreneur; businessman

Carl Johan Freer is a Swedish businessman and technology entrepreneur primarily known for founding the American company Tiger Telematics, which created the handheld game console Gizmondo. Freer is also the founder of Singapore-based medical-device company, Aluminaid and co-author of several patents.

== Business ventures ==
The earlier part of Carl’s career was focused on disruptive software companies. Freer founded Tiger Telematics, an electronics company that launched in 2002, raised over £160 million, and reached a market cap over $1 billion before it dissolved in 2006. He managed the development, launch and promotion of the Gizmondo. Freer was Chairman of the Tiger Telematics board of directors until he resigned in October 2005 pending publication of an article in the Swedish press. By 6 February 2006, the company was forced into compulsory liquidation and Gizmondo was discontinued.

Other ventures included Xero Mobile—which had a service that automatically billed advertisers based on the number of marketing messages viewed by users—and Getfugu, which developed an application that enabled consumers to retrieve web content without typing a website address or search term into a browser. Freer co-founded a crowdsourcing networking website for filmmakers, financiers, actors and fans called FilmFunds as well as the Family Tree Foundation.

In 2008, Carl Freer hosted a seminar at Georgia Institute of Technology entitled "High Tech Ventures in Mobile Gaming and Media". Freer discussed his experiences, his plans for a potential rebirth of Gizmondo as well as his plans for the development of new mobile video technologies. The event took place as part of GA Tech's GVU Center Lecture series. Later that year, a relaunch of Gizmondo was aborted. In 2010, Freer co-founded Aluminaid, which makes metal-based bandages to relieve pain in patients with first- and second-degree burns.

Freer is from a computational science background focusing on the biotech domain. In 2008, he, along with Richard Grossman and Tom Brady, founded Aluminaid, a medical device company that developed a patented burn dressing. The company relocated to Singapore’s Biopolis Biotech park and produced wound care products and first-aid kits for burns treatment.

In 2020, Carl Freer founded Cellvera, a company dedicated to the research and development of oral treatments for viral diseases. The firm expanded its operations through a licensing agreement with FujiFilm Toyama for the production and distribution of AVIGAN, a decision that contributed to a notable increase in revenue from $9 million in 2020 to an estimated $100 million in 2021. Cellvera's focus includes advancing treatments for various life-threatening viruses, reflecting its commitment to addressing global health challenges.

Freer founded Prepaire Labs as an effort to integrate artificial intelligence (AI) and data science into the drug development process. The initiative collaborates with academic and research institutions to apply advances in genome research, notably CRISPR technology. Prepaire Labs aims to optimize the drug development pipeline by facilitating target identification, lead discovery, optimization, drug synthesis, and pre-clinical testing, thereby seeking to enhance efficiency in developing treatments for various diseases.

In February 2024, on behalf of Prepaire Labs, Freer entered into a strategic partnership with MGI, announced at MEDLAB Middle East 2024, aimed at advancing drug discovery and precision medicine. This collaboration marked the introduction of MGI's DNBSEQ-T20×2 sequencer to the Middle East, emphasizing the enhancement of genomics research and personalized medicine through advanced sequencing technology.

== Patents ==
Carl Freer has been granted several patents in the fields of technology and pharmaceuticals:

1. Multimedia Content Transmission System: US Patent 10,628,856 B2, granted on April 21, 2020, presents a method for transmitting multimedia content effectively over telecommunications networks. It introduces novel applets for decrypting and scheduling playback on mobile platforms, along with feedback mechanisms to improve user engagement and advertiser benefits.
2. Antiviral and Antiparasitic Pharmaceutical Combination: US Patent 11,446,320 B1, issued on September 20, 2022, describes a pharmaceutical composition that combines favipiravir and ivermectin for the treatment of single-stranded RNA viruses, including SARS-CoV-2.
3. Diagnostic and Treatment System for RNA Viruses: US Patent 11,439,638 B1, granted on September 13, 2022, outlines a system for the diagnosis and treatment of RNA viruses, with a focus on coronaviruses.
4. Thermally Conductive Metal-Based Bandages for Medical Healing: US Patent 9271875B2 details a method for creating bandages from thermally conductive metal, such as aluminum, designed to treat burns and other skin injuries by promoting faster cooling and healing through direct contact with the wound.

== Legal issues ==
Freer has been arrested by police in Sweden, Spain, Germany, the UK and the USA. He has used aliases: Eric Jonsson and Brian Littleton.

Freer's business partners, Stefan Eriksson and Mikael Ljungman, have both been convicted of fraud.

Carl Freer was at the helm of Gizmondo Europe Limited during one of the biggest company fraud investigations in recent British history, totaling 215 million pounds (UK).

In 2005, Freer was fined £135,000 by a court in Stuttgart, Germany for canceling check payments in a transaction with a car dealer. Freer claimed he cancelled the cheques because he "thought he was being sold stolen cars".

In 2006, no charges were filed after Los Angeles police found a collection of twelve rifles and four handguns at Freer's home in an investigation that led to his arrest on suspicion of impersonating a San Gabriel Valley Transit Authority police officer to buy a .44 Magnum handgun. Authorities dropped the investigation after Freer established that he did not impersonate a police officer and showed a valid gun permit.

In 2009, the law firm Patton Boggs, on behalf of clients David Warnock and Simon Davies, filed an action alleging violations of the civil RICO Act against GetFugu, Carl Freer, and other officers and directors of GetFugu. The firm followed the lawsuit with a press release that falsely claimed that GetFugu and Carl Freer were being investigated by the FBI. In 2010, on a motion by GetFugu, District Court Judge George H. King dismissed Patton Boggs' claims with prejudice. GetFugu and Freer then countersued Patton Boggs for defamation and malicious prosecution, seeking damages of over $500 million. Patton Boggs filed a special motion to strike the defamation claim, contending that the press release regarding the alleged FBI investigation, even if false, was protected by litigation privilege, but the California Court of Appeals disagreed, allowing Freer and GetFugu to proceed with the $500 million lawsuit against Patton Boggs. Patton Boggs' special motion to strike the malicious prosecution claim was also denied, holding that Patton Boggs did not have probable cause to prosecute the RICO claims.

In October 2015, Carl Freer unsuccessfully sued Danish Television Channel DR3 to have his name removed from a documentary on the Stein Bagger IT Factory fraud case prior to broadcast. Following the documentary broadcast, he filed defamation claims against 5 employees of DR.

== See also ==
- Gizmondo
