= Jim Parkman =

American lawyer

- Born: 1950 (age 75–76); Mobile, Alabama
- Education: Cumberland School of Law at Samford University
- Occupation: Lawyer (Criminal defense)

James W. Parkman, III (born 1950) is an American criminal defense lawyer in Birmingham, Alabama. He has been practicing law for over 40 years, and has represented several high-profile clients, most notably former HealthSouth CEO Richard M. Scrushy, Swedish criminal Bo Stefan Eriksson, former Detroit Mayor Kwame Kilpatrick, and Alabama State Senator Harri Anne Smith.

== Career ==
Parkman was born in Mobile, Alabama, raised in Dothan, Alabama, and graduated from the Cumberland School of Law at Samford University in 1979. He rose to national prominence when he was retained as lead counsel in the defense of HealthSouth CEO Richard Scrushy, who faced a high-profile prosecution on over 30 counts of accounting fraud. The long trial concluded with a colorful and folksy closing argument from Parkman, and Scrushy was ultimately acquitted on every count.

After the Scrushy trial, Parkman represented Bo Stefan Eriksson in California on auto theft charges involving exotic foreign automobiles, including an Enzo Ferrari which Eriksson crashed in Malibu, California. The trial ended with a deadlocked jury. Parkman also represented former Detroit Mayor Kwame Kilpatrick in his infamous federal corruption prosecution.

In the summer of 2011, Parkman represented Alabama State Senator Harri Anne Smith, who was charged along with eight others under federal bribery, mail and wire fraud statutes. After an initial mistrial, a second prosecution, and an expectedly colorful closing argument, Parkman was able to secure acquittals on all counts for his client.
