= Compressed file library =

- Developer(s): Fathammer Ltd.
- Written in: C++
- Type: Data compression
- License: Public domain software
- Website: sol.gfxile.net/code.html

Compressed file library
- Filename extension: .cfl
- Type of format: data compression
- Container for: archive format, file system

A compressed file library (CFL) is designed to work as a virtual file system for programs, especially for video games. By compressing various game resources into one file, it is able to lower the number of file accesses. The resources can also be encrypted in the CFL.

CFL is used by X-Forge, the multi-platform wireless 3D game engine developed by Fathammer Ltd. It is also used by IMVU for its 3D character models and accessories.

== See also ==
- Doom WAD, a similar file system
