= Mikael Ljungman =

Swedish politician, lawyer and businessman

- Born: 25 November 1963 (age 62); Östermalm, Stockholm, Sweden
- Education: Lawyer, Political Scientist
- Occupation: Businessman

Mikael Ljungman (born 25 November 1963) is a Swedish politician, lawyer and businessman. He was 2009–2010 convicted of fraud and false accounting related to his business activities, for which he served a two-year prison term. He is also known for his association and involvement with two high-profile tech failures: the game console manufacturer Gizmondo in 2005 and IT Factory in 2008. After his release from prison, Ljungman became active in the Christian Democrats legal policy network. He was selected as a Christian Democrats parliamentary candidate for the 2014 Swedish elections, as number 32 on their Stockholm candidate list.

== Education ==
Mikael Ljungman has a Master of Laws (LL.M.) from Stockholm University. He also studied political science.

== Association with Gizmondo ==
Ljungman's company 3P PreForm Marketing and Research began performing research and development work for Gizmondo Europe in 2003 and was paid $7.6 million. After Gizmondo Europe's bankruptcy in early 2006, the liquidators had outstanding questions about Ljungman and his company's involvement with Gizmondo Europe Ltd; they were perfectly satisfied with Ljungman's answers. In May 2008, Carl Freer bought Gizmondo Europe's intellectual property rights. Ljungman worked with Freer on the relaunch of the Gizmondo, with Freer calling him his "co-pilot". He traveled to China in early 2008 to arrange manufacturing, a contract purported to be worth $300M. The relaunch of Gizmondo never materialized.

== Conviction for false accounting ==
Ljungman was arrested on 19 October 2004, but released shortly thereafter pending trial. Ljungman was found guilty of false accounting and tax evasion on 26 January 2009. Ljungman initially received a two-year prison sentence; which was reduced to 10 months on appeal after the tax evasion charges were dismissed. The sentence included disqualification from running a company in Sweden for five years, which was reduced to three years starting from 2007 after the successful appeal. Ljungman's appeal went to the supreme court where it was denied and he was imprisoned in late April 2009.

== IT Factory scandal ==
In December 2008 Danish company IT Factory went bankrupt revealing systematic financial fraud. Ljungman was linked to IT Factory's CEO Stein Bagger, who went missing four days before the company's collapse was publicly announced. Bagger fled from Dubai to the United States and eventually surrendered to police in Los Angeles, where he was found to have Ljungman's car and to have used his credit card.

On 9 January 2009 the Deputy Attorney in charge of fraud cases in Denmark announced that they wanted to question Ljungman. Danish police sent out an arrest warrant for Ljungman via Interpol. He was arrested by Swedish police in Norrköping where he had just started his ten-month sentence in an open prison and was extradited to Denmark on 27 July 2009.

Danish media claimed that the Swedish police had found a fake leasing contract linking IT Factory with Xiop, a Swedish company where Ljungman had worked as Business Developer. This specific claim was denied by the Swedish prosecutor Yngve Rydberg. Yngve Rydberg also said at the time there was no suspicion of Ljungman being involved in the crimes being investigated in Sweden. On the first day of his trial Stein Bagger named Ljungman as his accomplice.

On 26 March 2010 Ljungman was convicted of involvement in the IT Factory fraud in Denmark, and was released under supervision in September 2013 after serving slightly less than half of a seven-year sentence.

Ljungman denied involvement in Stein Bagger's fraud and appealed his sentence, however as of the time of his supervised release, no successful appeal had been completed. Ljungman claimed he was interested in IT Factory's software PaaS, that he and Media Power tried to buy when IT Factory was liquidated. The software was instead sold to a German company.

In December 2012, Danish authorities recovered a portion of the money stolen from IT Factory from accounts in Hong Kong and Jersey belonging to Mikael Ljungman.

== Political activity ==
Shortly after he had served his prison term he was selected as a parliamentary candidate for the Christian Democrats in the 2014 Swedish elections as well as one of their representatives in the municipal elections and county council elections.
