= Fathammer =

Video game publisher and developer based in Finland

Fathammer was a video game publisher and developer based in Finland. They have developed 3 D game SDK, X-Forge, which was provided to Nokia N-gage cell phones, the Tapwave Zodiac, and also the Gizmondo. Fathammer's publishing business was acquired by Telcogames in June 2006, and X-Forge game development environment developed by Fathammer was sold to Acrodea in Japan. Fathammer's largest owners were the investment companies 3i and Nexit Ventures. The Finnish Independence Fund Sitra also invested more than EUR 1 million in the company, which had offices in Helsinki and Seoul, Korea.

== Notable games ==
- Chronicles of Narnia
- Hockey Rage 2005
- Tomb Raider: Legend
