= Stefan Eriksson =

Swedish criminal

Bo Stefan M. Eriksson (born December 14, 1961) is a Swedish video game developer and criminal from Uppsala involved in the British gaming company Gizmondo with his business partner Carl Freer, until it became insolvent in 2005. In February 2006, he became known for wrecking an Enzo Ferrari in Malibu, California, United States. He was the leader of the loose criminal organization "Uppsalamaffian" (The Uppsala mafia) until he began to develop the Gizmondo.

== Early criminal career ==
Eriksson became known by the Swedish police as Tjock-Steffe ("Fat Steve") or, The Banker, by the local mob in Sweden's fourth largest city of Uppsala, roughly 60 km north of Stockholm. An auto body shop worker, he started his criminal career with thefts and a three-month prison term in 1981, followed in 1988 by another term of 3½ years for cocaine and arms-related convictions.

== Uppsala mafia ==
In the early 90s, Eriksson became the head of a group the Swedish press dubbed Uppsalamaffian (the "Uppsala mafia" or "Uppsala mob"), which was responsible for high-profile, violent crimes, up until then rarely seen in the country. Known as a playboy, he often showed off a 1,200 horsepower (890 kW), 63' Sea Ray offshore race boat, with a top speed of 56 knots (64 mph; 104 km/h). He named it Snövit (Snow White), and docked it on a small river in downtown Uppsala. He was also seen driving a Mercedes SL with the license plate reading "GEO" (in Swedish, it is pronounced similar to the Cuban slang llello ("yeyo") for cocaine, used by Al Pacino in the 1983 movie Scarface.) With a legal front Kanoninkasso ("Cannon debt collectors"), the group collected debts using threats and violence. Establishing a reputation, they started to dress in expensive suits and hold "business meetings" in exclusive Stockholm hotels. Attempting to defraud the Swedish Bank Giro Central of 22 million kronor, Eriksson was found guilty of fraud and counterfeiting. In 1993 and 1994, Eriksson was sentenced to ten years in prison, though he only served half his sentence. Court documents show Eriksson and a partner broke into a man's home, destroyed his property, and punched him repeatedly in the face. Eriksson also held a knife to the man's throat, threatened to cut off his fingers, and finally shoved a gun into the man's mouth. The Swedish police had great difficulty finding people who dared to testify, and the head witness later survived two bomb attacks.

== Gizmondo ==
In 2001, Eriksson joined the UK-based company Gizmondo, which intended to rival Nintendo and Sony for the handheld videogames market. Eriksson's salary in 2004 was £1.1 million, with bonuses amounting to another £145,000 and a car allowance of £5,000 per month.

In an attempt to promote the product, Eriksson competed at the 24 hours of Le Mans. He arrived in a grey Enzo Ferrari and entered the race in the Gizmondo-sponsored Ferrari 360 Modena GTC in 2005 but retired during the morning with mechanical troubles. In October 2005, a Swedish paper revealed irregularities in the business dealings of Gizmondo, and the criminal past of some members of management, including Eriksson. Eriksson, and others resigned, and the company filed for bankruptcy after using up $300M, 90% in its last six months. The company was also involved in various litigation: Swedish Ogilvy Group, MTV, and former Formula 1 team Jordan Grand Prix all filed million dollar suits. In August, shortly before his resignation, Gizmondo relocated Eriksson to California for its U.S. launch. Subsequently, questions arose regarding how a convicted felon like Eriksson was able to enter the country, In early 2006, with ideas similar to now-defunct Gizmondo's Smart Adds, the virtual mobile operator (MVNO) XeroMobile was started through Eriksson's earlier partners.

== Ferrari car crash ==
On February 21, 2006, Eriksson lost control of an Enzo Ferrari sports car, valued at over $2,000,000 USD, while allegedly driving at a high speed and intoxicated along Pacific Coast Highway in California. The car careened off an embankment outside Malibu and hit a pole at about 162 miles per hour (261 km/h). The impact of the crash was so violent, it split the car in half. Eriksson and the Irish-born American Trevor Karney were found at the site. Eriksson claimed to be a passenger in the Ferrari, and that a man he only knew as "Dietrich" was the driver. Karney claimed to be the passenger of a Mercedes-Benz SLR McLaren that was racing the Ferrari. Neither Dietrich nor the Mercedes were to be found, and the police concluded that Eriksson was the driver and Karney the passenger, and that neither "Dietrich" nor the McLaren existed. Furthermore, the extent of Eriksson's injuries amounted to a cut lip, and blood was found on the driver-side airbag.

Investigators confirmed the existence of the videotape of the accident shot from inside the car. The video showed the speedometer giving the 199 mph (320 km/h) reading right before it malfunctioned due to the crash. The tape is believed to be with Karney.

Eriksson brandished a business card claiming to be a deputy police commissioner with the San Gabriel Valley Transit Authority (whose founder was later arrested for perjury in connection with the case), and Karney borrowed a phone in a passerby's car where he tucked away a magazine for a Glock pistol. Two men showed up to speak with Eriksson, claiming to be from the Department of Homeland Security.

On March 29, 2006, Nicole Persson, Eriksson's fiancee, was pulled over while driving a 2005 Mercedes-Benz SLR McLaren. She was pulled over because the officer found the car's European license plate suspicious. It was discovered that Persson did not have a valid driver's license. The police found the car to be unregistered, carrying British license plates, and illegally exported from Britain. Further investigation revealed that the crashed red Ferrari, a second black Ferrari, and two other Mercedes-Benz cars were also unregistered and illegally exported. It was found that all five cars, valued at $10.8 million, were leased in Britain. Moreover, lease payments for them had ceased; and that after the export, the Mercedes was reported stolen in Britain with insurance pay-out. Footage of Eriksson in his black Ferrari, shot by the founders of a car enthusiast website, Car-parazzi.com, was held as evidence against him by European authorities.

== Police investigation and trial ==
Police raided Eriksson's Bel Air home on April 8, 2006. Eriksson, preparing to leave the US, was arrested on suspicion of embezzlement, grand theft auto, drunken driving, cocaine possession, and weapons charges stemming from a Magnum handgun encountered during the search. He initially faced up to 14 years in prison, which was later reduced in a plea bargain. In May, misdemeanor hit and run and driving without a California license and insurance were added in relation to a Porsche Cayenne allegedly driven by Eriksson rear-ending an SUV near his Bel Air home on January 4.

On May 9, 2006, police raided the San Gabriel Valley Transit Authority (a minor bus service for area senior citizens), arresting its owner and confiscating guns, badges, and a vehicle equipped to be an unmarked police car.

On November 3, 2006, a mistrial was declared after a two-week trial, when the jury was deadlocked 10-2 toward convicting Eriksson. Eriksson was represented at trial by Jim Parkman, who successfully represented former Healthsouth CEO Richard Scrushy. Eriksson was also represented by Parkman's partner, William White, as well as Los Angeles criminal attorney Alec Rose. The prosecution indicated their intent to retry the case.

== Jail, deportation to Sweden, and later ==
Eriksson accepted a plea bargain for three years in jail and deportation. He pleaded guilty to two counts of embezzlement and one count of illegal gun possession. He avoided an auto theft charge. Eriksson was released from prison on January 21, 2008.

He was deported back to Sweden where he soon received an 18-month prison sentence for extortion and aggravated assault after pouring petrol on a target of his debt collection services. In October 2014, he was facing further charges of possession of cocaine and other drugs, and driving under the influence of drugs.

== In the media ==
In March 2015, the stage play Tjock-Steffe premiered in his home town of Uppsala based on his life in the "Uppsala Mafia", Gizmondo and the subsequent car crash that propelled him to global notoriety.

== Racing record ==
=== Complete 24 Hours of Le Mans results ===
Year	Team	Co-Drivers	Car	Class	Laps	Pos.	Class Pos.
2005	(United Kingdom) Cirtek Motorsport (Russia) Conversbank	(New Zealand) Rob Wilson (United Kingdom) Joe Macari	Ferrari 360 Modena GTC	GT2	218	DNF	DNF
