= Stein Bagger =

Danish convicted criminal (born 1967)

Magnus Bagger
- Born: January 20, 1967 (age 58)
- Other names: Sten Hansen
- Occupation: Convicted Criminal
- Criminal penalty: Seven years in prison
- Partner: Mikael Ljungman

Stein Bagger (born January 20, 1967) is a Danish convicted criminal, former entrepreneur, former CEO of IT Factory. Before bankruptcy of IT Factory and a subsequent fraud scandal, he was named "Danish Entrepreneur of the Year" by Ernst & Young, and his company was named "Denmark's best IT company" two years in a row by the magazine Computerworld. On the 11 June 2009, Stein Bagger was sentenced to a seven-year prison sentence. He was released on license on 24 March 2014, having served approximately 5 years of his sentence.

== Disappearance and charges ==
Bagger disappeared on 27 November 2008, while on a trip to Dubai with his wife and business colleagues. On 1 December, information emerged indicating that IT Factory's revenue had been artificially inflated and a leasing scam had defrauded banks and private investors for over 831 million Danish kroner (186 million US dollars), making this the biggest financial fraud case in Denmark in recent decades. As a result, Bagger was charged with fraud and forgery, and a warrant for his arrest was put out by Interpol.

== Fake degrees ==
Stein Bagger claimed that he had several academic degrees, including an MBA and a PhD in International Business from "San Francisco Technical University". No such university exists. After reporters inquired about the alleged degrees, Bagger hired an American actress to impersonate an official of the fake university, to "verify" his degrees.

== Re-emergence and incarceration ==
Stein Bagger turned himself in to US police in downtown Los Angeles at approximately 21:00 GMT on 6 December 2008. Bagger had reportedly left Dubai on a plane destined for New York where he borrowed a car from a Swedish friend, Mikael Ljungman, before making a cross-country trip to Los Angeles. According to statements posted by him on his family's blog (and later repeated in an interview and apparently in court), he had allegedly been a victim of systematic extortion and threats towards his family, forcing him to take fraudulent steps in order to raise revenue to secure his family. However, many critics doubt the veracity of those statements. Bagger was held in US custody until his extradition to Danish legal authorities. On December 16, he was extradited to Denmark and jailed pending further investigations.

== Nature of scam ==
Investigations revealed that Bagger employed a duping scheme by forging large sales orders creating fictional revenue. In the scheme, real and fictional overseas "partner" companies sold non-existent large hardware and software bundles (such as a complete $10 million hosting center) to IT Factory, IT Factory then obtained leasing contracts financing the fake purchases. About half the leasing funded money paid to the partner was spent on purchases of software from IT Factory, thus inflating company earnings. The leasing contracts were not considered debts under the accounting standards used, so IT Factory looked lucrative on paper, and because the leased goods were fictional, each "partner" was left with about half the price as personal profit. Since each fraudulent transaction was for such a large amount, only a relatively small number of fake documents would be needed to pull off the $200 million scam.
